= United States Coast Guard =

U.S. sea rescue and security force

- Seal of the United States Coast Guard
- Founded: January 28, 1915 (as current service); August 4, 1790; 236 years ago (as the Revenue-Marine)
- Country: United States
- Type: Coast guard
- Role: Port and waterway security; Law enforcement; Drug interdiction; Aids to navigation; Search and rescue; Illegal, unreported and unregulated fishing; Marine safety; Defense readiness; Migrant interdiction; Marine environmental protection; Icebreaking operations
- Size: 40,558 active duty personnel; 7,724 reserve personnel; 21,000 auxiliarists; 8,577 civilian personnel (as of 2020)
- Part of: United States Armed Forces; Department of Homeland Security; Department of Defense; Department of the Navy (during wartime)
- Headquarters: Douglas A. Munro Coast Guard Headquarters Building, Washington, D.C., U.S.
- Nicknames: "Coasties"; "The Guard"; "Puddle Pirates"
- Mottos: Semper Paratus; Always ready
- Colors: CG Red, CG Blue, White
- March: "Semper Paratus"
- Anniversaries: 4 August
- Equipment: List of U.S. Coast Guard equipment
- Engagements: See list: Quasi-War; War of 1812; Seminole Wars; West Indies Anti-Piracy Operations; African Anti-Slavery Operations; Mexican–American War; American Civil War; Spanish–American War; World War I; World War II; Korean War; Vietnam War; Invasion of Grenada; Invasion of Panama; Persian Gulf War; Operation Uphold Democracy; Kosovo War; War in Afghanistan; Iraq War; Operation Martillo; Operation Inherent Resolve; Operation Southern Spear
- Website: uscg.mil

Commanders
- Commander-in-Chief: President Donald Trump
- Secretary of Homeland Security: Markwayne Mullin
- Commandant: ADM Kevin E. Lunday
- Vice Commandant: ADM Thomas G. Allan Jr.
- Master Chief Petty Officer of the Coast Guard: MCPOCG Phillip N. Waldron

Insignia
- Ensign

- Service mark

- Flag

- Jack

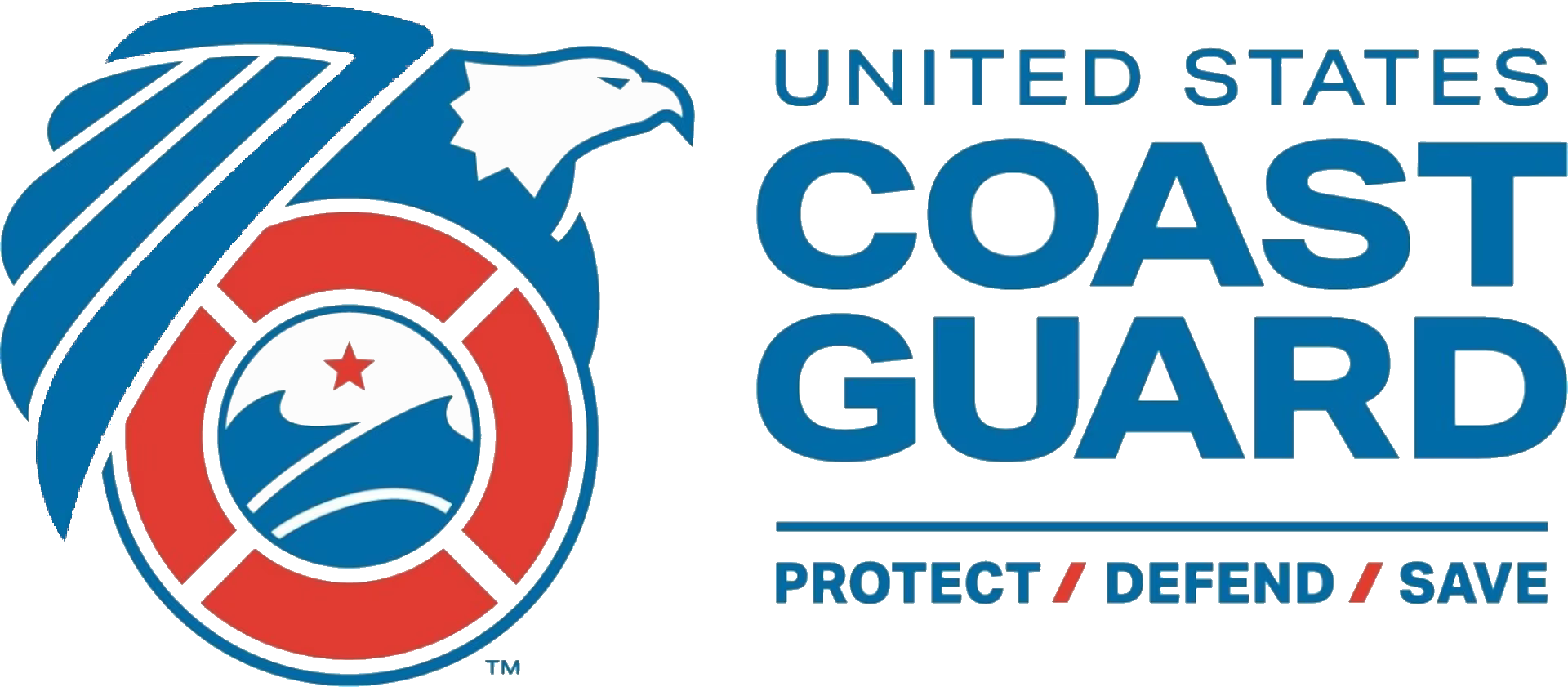
- Wordmark

The United States Coast Guard (USCG) is the maritime security, search and rescue, and law enforcement service branch of the United States Armed Forces. It is one of the country's eight uniformed services. The service is a maritime, military, multi-mission service unique among the United States military branches for having a maritime law enforcement mission with jurisdiction in both domestic and international waters and a federal regulatory agency mission as part of its duties. It is the largest coast guard in the world.

The U.S. Coast Guard protects the United States' borders and economic and security interests abroad; and defends its sovereignty by safeguarding sea lines of communication and commerce across U.S. territorial waters and its exclusive economic zone. Like its United States Navy sibling, the U.S. Coast Guard maintains a global presence with permanently-assigned personnel throughout the world and forces routinely deploying to both littoral and blue-water regions. As a humanitarian service, it provides emergency response and disaster management for a wide range of human-made and natural catastrophic incidents in the U.S. and throughout the world.

The U.S. Coast Guard operates under the U.S. Department of Homeland Security during peacetime. During times of war, it can be transferred in whole or in part to the U.S. Department of the Navy under the Department of Defense by order of the U.S. president or by act of Congress. Prior to its transfer to Homeland Security, it operated under the Department of Transportation from 1967 to 2003 and the Department of the Treasury from its inception until 1967. A congressional authority transfer to the Navy has only happened once: in 1917, during World War I. As for World War II, the U.S. Coast Guard was transferred to the Navy by President Franklin Roosevelt one month before the country's entry into the war.

The U.S. Coast Guard was formed by a merger of the U.S. Revenue Cutter Service and the U.S. Life-Saving Service on 28 January 1915, under the Department of the Treasury. The Revenue Cutter Service was created by Congress as the Revenue-Marine on 4 August 1790 at the request of Alexander Hamilton, and is therefore the oldest continuously operating naval service of the United States. (Note: Although the U.S. Navy lists its founding as 1775 with the formation of the Continental Navy, the U.S. Navy was entirely disbanded in 1785. The modern U.S. Navy in its present form was founded in 1794.) As secretary of the treasury, Hamilton headed the Revenue-Marine, whose original purpose was collecting customs duties at U.S. seaports. By the 1860s, the service was known as the U.S. Revenue Cutter Service and the term Revenue-Marine gradually fell into disuse.

In 1939, the U.S. Lighthouse Service was also merged into the U.S. Coast Guard. As one of the country's six armed services, the U.S. Coast Guard and its predecessor have participated in every major U.S. war since 1790, from the Quasi-War with France to the Global War on Terrorism.

As of December 2021, the U.S. Coast Guard's authorized force strength is 44,500 active duty personnel and 7,000 reservists. (Note: The number of uniformed personnel currently authorized by component. The number actually serving is usually less than the number authorized due to personnel turnover and recruitment efforts that have not filled all available vacancies.) The service's force strength also includes 8,577 full-time civilian federal employees and 21,000 uniformed auxiliarists of the U.S. Coast Guard Auxiliary. The service maintains an extensive fleet of roughly 250 coastal and ocean-going cutters, patrol ships, buoy tenders, tugs, and icebreakers; as well as nearly 2,000 small boats and specialized craft. It also maintains an aviation division consisting of more than 200 helicopters and fixed-wing aircraft. While the U.S. Coast Guard is the second smallest of the U.S. military service branches in terms of membership, the service by itself is the world's 12th largest naval force.

== Mission ==
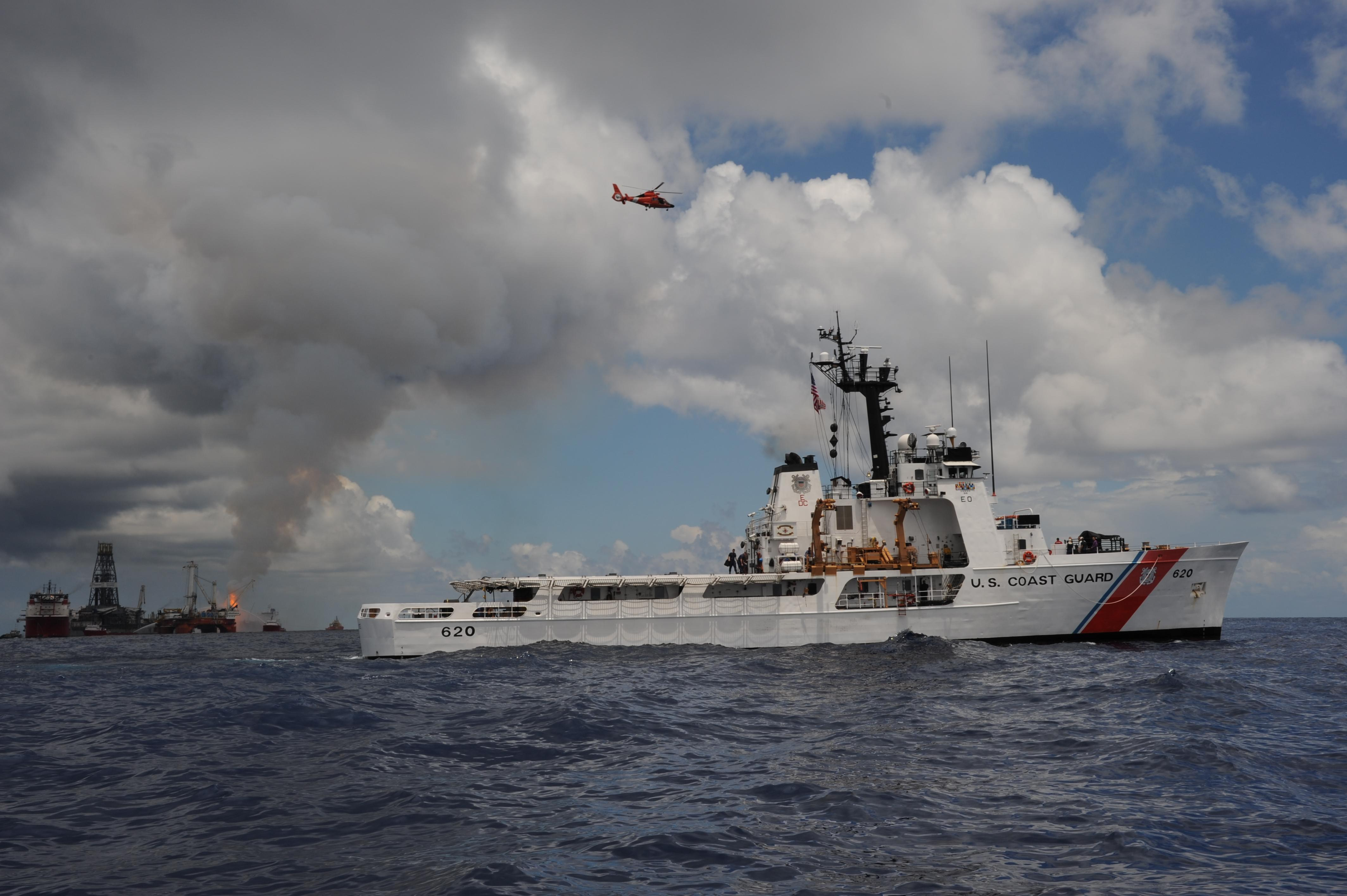
A USCG HH-65 Dolphin helicopter flies overhead as the Coast Guard Cutter Resolute steams near Deepwater Horizon spill site, July 4, 2010.

=== Role ===
The Coast Guard carries out three basic roles, which are further subdivided into eleven statutory missions. The three roles are:

- Maritime safety
- Maritime security
- Maritime stewardship

With a decentralized organization and much responsibility placed on even the most junior personnel, the Coast Guard is frequently lauded for its quick responsiveness and adaptability in a broad range of emergencies. In a 2005 article in Time magazine following Hurricane Katrina, the author wrote, "the Coast Guard's most valuable contribution to [a military effort when catastrophe hits] may be as a model of flexibility, and most of all, spirit." Wil Milam, a rescue swimmer from Alaska told the magazine, "In the Navy, it was all about the mission. Practicing for war, training for war. In the Coast Guard, it was, take care of our people and the mission will take care of itself."

=== Missions ===
The eleven statutory missions as defined by law are divided into homeland security missions and non-homeland security missions:

==== Non-homeland security missions ====
- Ice operations, including the International Ice Patrol
- Living marine resources (fisheries law enforcement)
- Marine environmental protection
- Marine safety
- Aids to navigation
- Search and rescue

==== Homeland security missions ====
- Defense readiness
- Maritime law enforcement
- Migrant interdiction
- Ports, waterways and coastal security (PWCS)
- Drug interdiction

=== Search and rescue ===
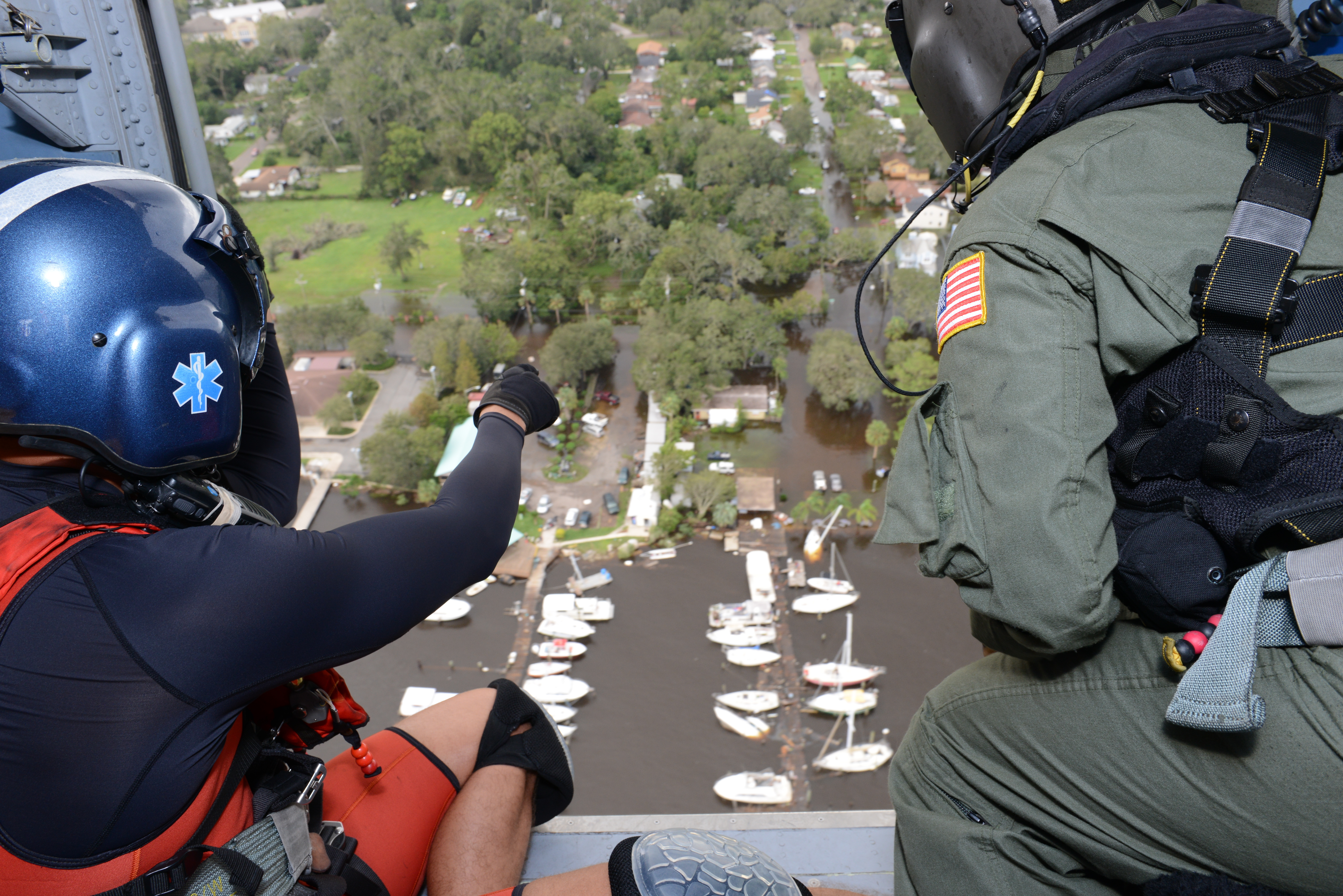
USCG helicopter, Rescue swimmers conduct search and rescue after Hurricane Irma

The U.S. Coast Guard Search and Rescue (CG-SAR) is one of the Coast Guard's best-known operations. The National Search and Rescue Plan designates the Coast Guard as the federal agency responsible for maritime SAR operations, and the United States Air Force as the federal agency responsible for inland SAR. Both agencies maintain rescue coordination centers to coordinate this effort, and have responsibility for both military and civilian search and rescue. The two services jointly provide instructor staff for the National Search and Rescue School that trains SAR mission planners and coordinators. Previously located on Governors Island, New York, the school is now located at Coast Guard Training Center Yorktown at Yorktown, Virginia.

=== National Response Center ===
Operated by the Coast Guard, the National Response Center (NRC) is the sole U.S. Government point of contact for reporting all oil, chemical, radiological, biological, and etiological spills and discharges into the environment, anywhere in the United States and its territories. In addition to gathering and distributing spill/incident information for Federal On Scene Coordinators and serving as the communications and operations center for the National Response Team, the NRC maintains agreements with a variety of federal entities to make additional notifications regarding incidents meeting established trigger criteria. The NRC also takes Maritime Suspicious Activity and Security Breach Reports. Details on the NRC organization and specific responsibilities can be found in the National Oil and Hazardous Substances Pollution Contingency Plan. The Marine Information for Safety and Law Enforcement (MISLE) database system is managed and used by the Coast Guard for tracking pollution and safety incidents in the nation's ports.

=== National Maritime Center ===
The National Maritime Center (NMC) is the merchant mariner credentialing authority for the USCG under the auspices of the Department of Homeland Security. To ensure a safe, secure, and environmentally sound marine transportation system, the mission of the NMC is to issue credentials to fully qualified mariners in the United States maritime jurisdiction.

=== Authority as an armed service ===
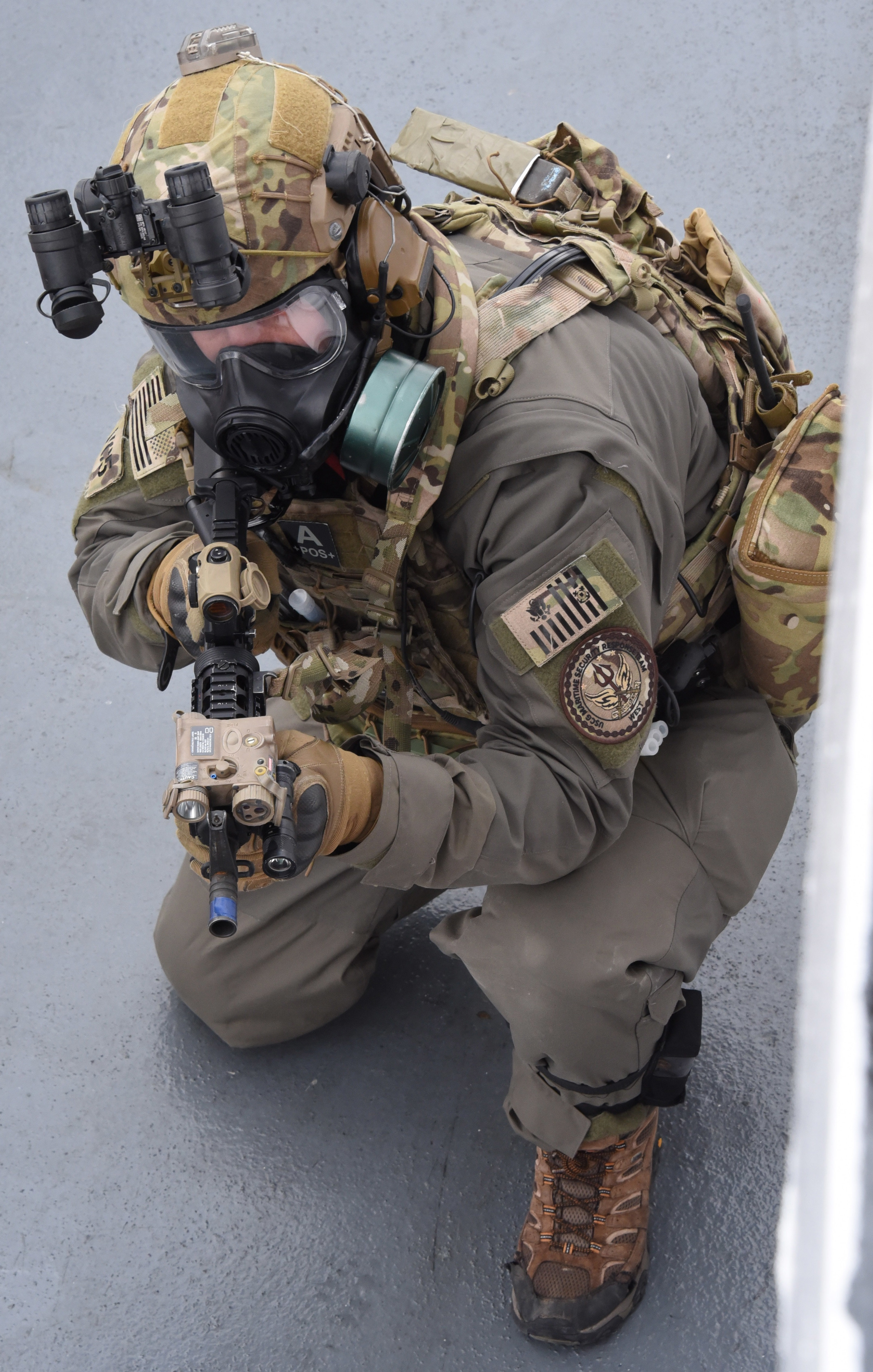
A member of USCG Maritime Security Response Team West trains for a simulated terrorist threat aboard the motor vessel

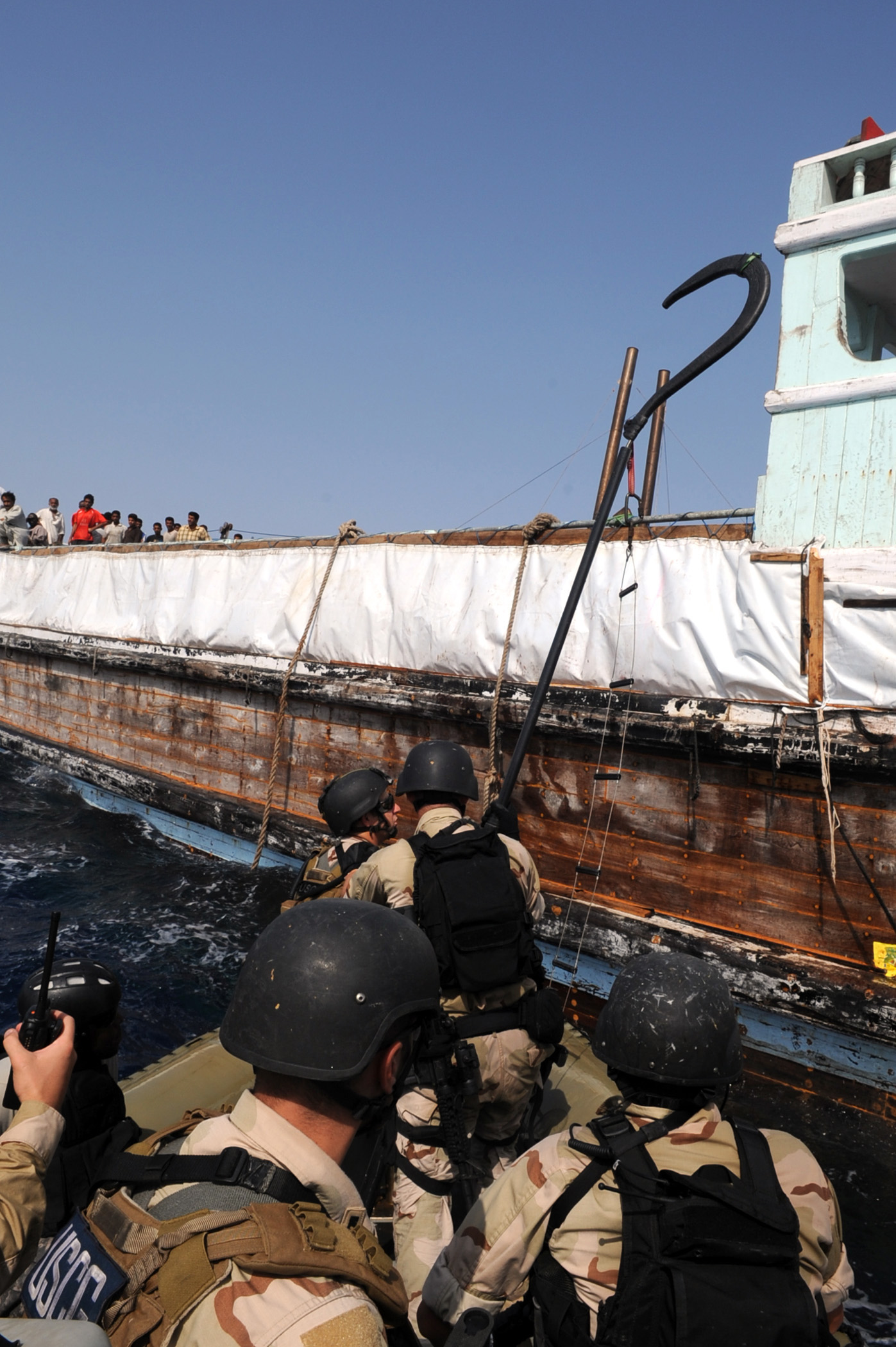
Maritime Safety and Security Team conduct operations in the Gulf of Aden Sept. 8, 2009 part of Combined Task Force 151, a multinational task force established to conduct counterpiracy operations off the coast of Somalia.

Title 10 of the U.S. Code says that "[t]he term "armed forces" means the Army, Marine Corps, Navy, Air Force, Space Force, and Coast Guard." The Coast Guard is further defined by Title 14 of the United States Code: "The Coast Guard as established January 28, 1915, shall be a military service and a branch of the armed forces of the United States at all times. The Coast Guard shall be a service in the Department of Homeland Security, except when operating as a service in the Navy." Coast Guard organization and operation is as set forth in Title 33 of the Code of Federal Regulations.

On 25 November 2002, the Homeland Security Act was signed into law by U.S. President George W. Bush, designating the Coast Guard to be placed under the U.S. Department of Homeland Security. The transfer of administrative control from the U.S. Department of Transportation to the U.S. Department of Homeland Security was completed the following year, on 1 March 2003.

The U.S. Coast Guard reports directly to the civilian secretary of homeland security. However, under 14 U.S.C. § 3 as amended by section 211 of the Coast Guard and Maritime Transportation Act of 2006, upon the declaration of war and when Congress so directs in the declaration, or when the president directs, the Coast Guard operates under the Department of Defense as a service in the Department of the Navy.

As members of the military, coast guardsmen on active and reserve service are subject to the Uniform Code of Military Justice and receive the same pay and allowances as members of the same pay grades in the other uniformed services.

The service has participated in every major U.S. conflict from 1790 through today, including landing troops on D-Day and on the Pacific Islands in World War II, in extensive patrols and shore bombardment during the Vietnam War, and multiple roles in Operation Iraqi Freedom. Maritime interception operations, coastal security, transportation security, and law enforcement detachments have been its major roles in recent conflicts in Iraq.

On 17 October 2007, the Coast Guard joined with the U.S. Navy and U.S. Marine Corps to adopt a new maritime strategy called A Cooperative Strategy for 21st Century Seapower that raised the notion of prevention of war to the same philosophical level as the conduct of war. This new strategy charted a course for the Navy, Coast Guard and Marine Corps to work collectively with each other and international partners to prevent regional crises, man-made or natural, from occurring, or reacting quickly should one occur to avoid negative impacts to the United States. During the launch of the new U.S. maritime strategy at the International Seapower Symposium at the U.S. Naval War College in 2007, Coast Guard commandant admiral Thad Allen said the new maritime strategy reinforced the time-honored missions the service has carried out in the United States since 1790. "It reinforces the Coast Guard maritime strategy of safety, security and stewardship, and it reflects not only the global reach of our maritime services but the need to integrate and synchronize and act with our coalition and international partners to not only win wars ... but to prevent wars," Allen said.

=== Authority as a law enforcement agency ===
USCG Munro Law Enforcement Detachments boarding team interdicts suspected drug smuggling vessel

14 U.S.C. § 102 authorizes the Coast Guard to enforce U.S. federal laws. This authority is further defined in 14 U.S.C. § 522, which gives law enforcement powers to all Coast Guard commissioned officers, warrant officers, and petty officers. Unlike the other armed forces branches, which are prevented from acting in a law enforcement capacity by 18 U.S.C. § 1385, the Posse Comitatus Act, and Department of Defense policy, the Coast Guard is exempt from and not subject to the restrictions of the Posse Comitatus Act.

Further law enforcement authority is given by 14 U.S.C. § 703 and 19 U.S.C. § 1401, which empower U.S. Coast Guard active and reserve commissioned officers, warrant officers, and petty officers as federal customs officers. This places them under 19 U.S.C. § 1589a, which grants customs officers general federal law enforcement authority, including the authority to:

(1) carry a firearm;
(2) execute and serve any order, warrant, subpoena, summons, or other process issued under the authority of the United States;
(3) make an arrest without a warrant for any offense against the United States committed in the officer's presence or for a felony, cognizable under the laws of the United States committed outside the officer's presence if the officer has reasonable grounds to believe that the person to be arrested has committed or is committing a felony; and
(4) perform any other law enforcement duty that the Secretary of Homeland Security may designate.

— 19 USC §1589a. Enforcement authority of customs officers

The U.S. Government Accountability Office Report to the House of Representatives, Committee on the Judiciary on its 2006 Survey of Federal Civilian Law Enforcement Functions and Authorities, identified the Coast Guard as one of 104 federal components that employed law enforcement officers. The report also included a summary table of the authorities of the Coast Guard's 192 special agents and 3,780 maritime law enforcement boarding officers.

Coast Guardsmen have the legal authority to carry their service-issued firearms on and off base. This is rarely done in practice, however; at many Coast Guard stations, commanders prefer to have all service-issued weapons in armories when not in use. Still, one court has held in the case of People v. Booth that Coast Guard boarding officers are qualified law enforcement officers authorized to carry personal firearms off-duty for self-defense.

== History ==
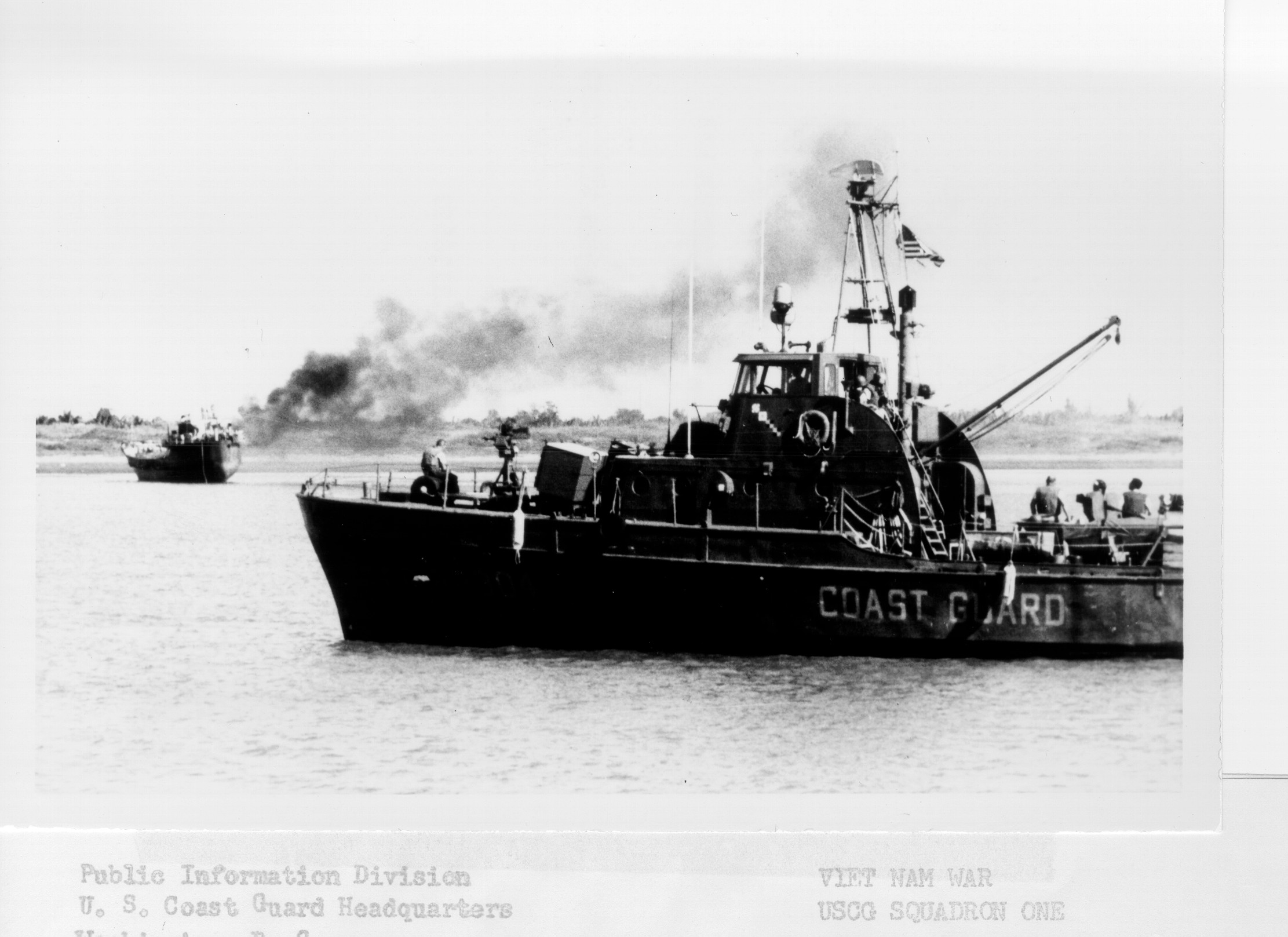
USCGC patrol boat forces North Vietnamese trawler aground after combat from direct fire (Vietnam War)

The Coast Guard traced its roots to the small fleet of vessels maintained by the United States Department of the Treasury beginning in the 1790s to enforce tariffs (an important source of revenue for the new nation). Secretary of the Treasury Alexander Hamilton lobbied Congress to fund the construction of ten cutters, which it did on 4 August 1790 (now celebrated as the Coast Guard's official birthday). Until the re-establishment of the Navy in 1798, these "revenue cutters" were the only naval force of the early United States. As such, the cutters and their crews frequently took on additional duties, including combating piracy, rescuing mariners in distress, ferrying government officials, and even carrying mail. Initially not an organized federal agency at all, merely a "system of cutters," each ship operated under the direction of the customs officials in the port to which it was assigned. Several names, including "Revenue-Marine," were used as the service gradually became more organized. Eventually it was officially organized as the United States Revenue Cutter Service. In addition to its regular law enforcement and customs duties, revenue cutters and their crews were used to support and supplement the Navy in various armed conflicts including the American Civil War.

A separate federal agency, the U.S. Life-Saving Service, developed alongside the Revenue-Marine. Prior to 1848, there were various charitable efforts at creating systems to provide assistance to shipwrecked mariners from shore-based stations, notably by the Massachusetts Humane Society. The federal government began funding lifesaving stations in 1848 but funding was inconsistent and the system still relied on all-volunteer crews. In 1871, Sumner Increase Kimball was appointed chief of the Treasury Department's newly created Revenue Marine Division, and began the process of organizing the Revenue-Marine cutters into a centralized agency. Kimball also pushed for more funding lifesaving stations and eventually secured approval to create the Lifesaving Service as a separate federal agency, also within the Treasury Department, with fulltime paid crews.

In 1915 these two agencies, the Revenue Cutter Service and the Lifesaving Service, were merged to create the modern United States Coast Guard. The Lighthouse Service and the Bureau of Marine Inspection and Navigation were absorbed by the Coast Guard 1939 and 1942 respectively. In 1967, the Coast Guard moved from the U.S. Department of the Treasury to the newly formed U.S. Department of Transportation, an arrangement that lasted until it was placed under the U.S. Department of Homeland Security in 2003 as part of legislation designed to more efficiently protect American interests following the terrorist attacks of 11 September 2001.

In times of war, the Coast Guard or individual components of it can operate as a service of the Department of the Navy. This arrangement has a broad historical basis, as the Coast Guard has been involved in wars as diverse as the War of 1812, the Mexican–American War, and the American Civil War, in which the cutter Harriet Lane fired the first naval shots attempting to relieve besieged Fort Sumter. The last time the Coast Guard operated as a whole within the Navy was in World War II, in all some 250,000 served in the Coast Guard during World War II. A major fixture of the Coast Guard during WWII were the Beach Patrol units, responsible for patrolling the shorelines of the United States on-foot and horseback.

Coast Guard Squadron One, was a combat unit formed by the United States Coast Guard in 1965 for service during the Vietnam War. Placed under the operational control of the United States Navy, it was assigned duties in Operation Market Time. Its formation marked the first time since World War II that Coast Guard personnel were used extensively in a combat environment. The squadron operated divisions in three separate areas during the period of 1965 to 1970. Twenty-six Point-class cutters with their crews and a squadron support staff were assigned to the U.S. Navy with the mission of interdicting the movement of arms and supplies from the South China Sea into South Vietnam by Viet Cong and North Vietnam junk and trawler operators. The squadron also provided 81mm mortar naval gunfire support to nearby friendly units operating along the South Vietnamese coastline and assisted the U.S. Navy during Operation Sealords.

Coast Guard Squadron Three, was a combat unit formed by the United States Coast Guard in 1967 for service during the Vietnam War. Placed under the operational control of the United States Navy and based in Pearl Harbor. It consisted of five USCG High Endurance Cutters operating on revolving six-month deployments. A total of 35 High Endurance Cutters took part in operations from May 1967 to December 1971, most notably using their 5-inch guns to provide naval gunfire support missions.

Often units within the Coast Guard operate under Department of the Navy operational control while other Coast Guard units remain under the Department of Homeland Security.

=== Deployable Operations Group/Deployable Specialized Forces ===
The Deployable Operations Group (DOG) was a Coast Guard command established in July 2007. The DOG established a single command authority to rapidly provide the Coast Guard, Department of Homeland Security, Department of Defense, Department of Justice and other interagency operational commanders adaptive force packages drawn from the Coast Guard's deployable specialized force units. The DOG was disestablished on 22 April 2013 and reorganized into Deployable Specialized Forces (DSF) units that were placed under the control of the Atlantic and Pacific Area Commanders.

The planning for the unit began after the terrorist attacks of 11 September 2001, and culminated with its formation on 20 July 2007. Its missions included maritime law enforcement, anti-terrorism, port security, pollution response, and diving operations.

There were over 25 specialized units within the Deployable Operations Group including the Maritime Security Response Team, Maritime Safety and Security Teams, Law Enforcement Detachments, Port Security Units, the National Strike Force, and Regional Dive Lockers. The DOG also managed Coast Guard personnel assigned to the Navy Expeditionary Combat Command and was involved in the selection of Coast Guard candidates to attend Navy BUD/S and serve with Navy SEAL Teams.

==== Images ====
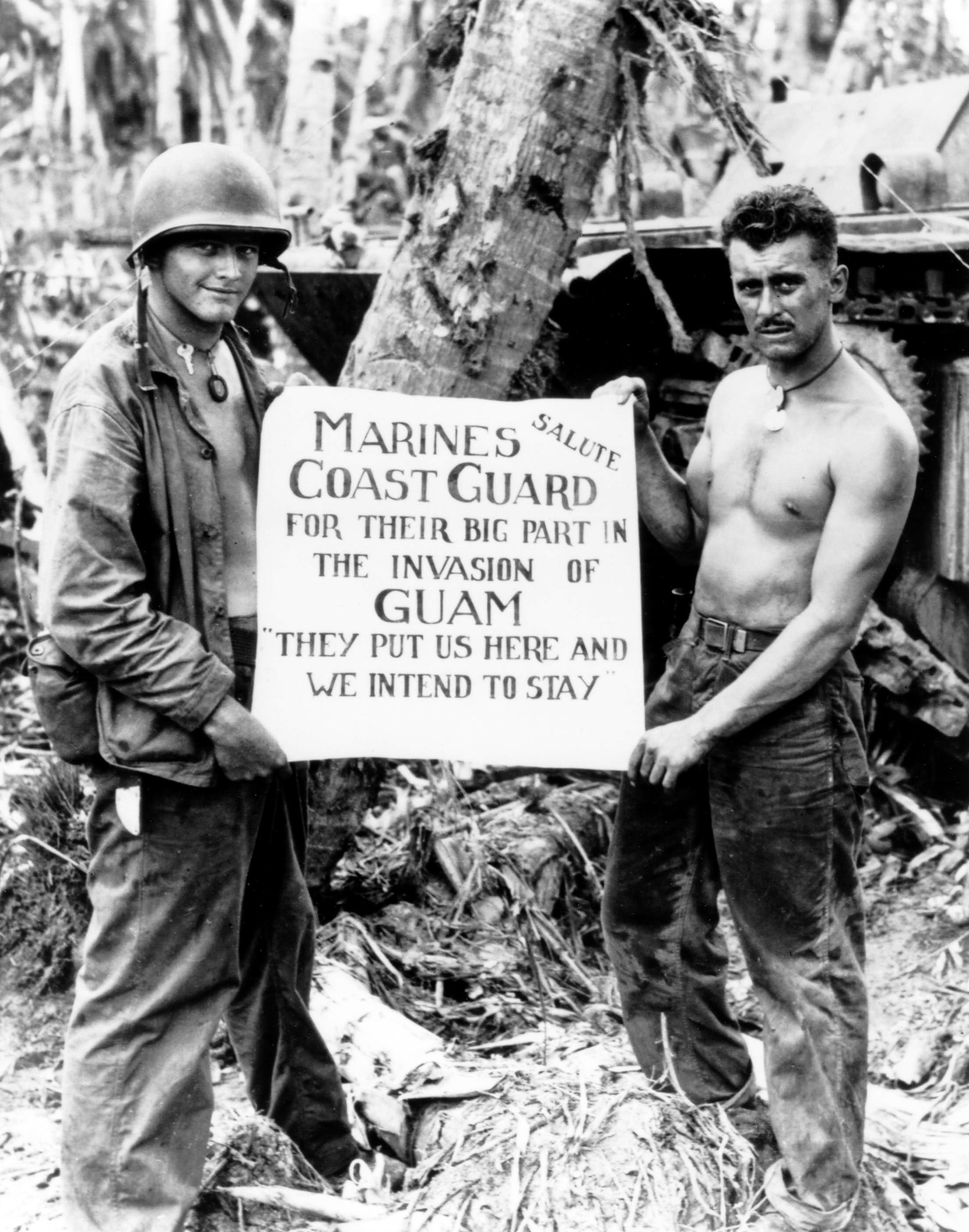
Marine Corps Privates First Class William A. McCoy and Ralph L. Plunkett holding a sign thanking the Coast Guard after the Battle of Guam in 1944

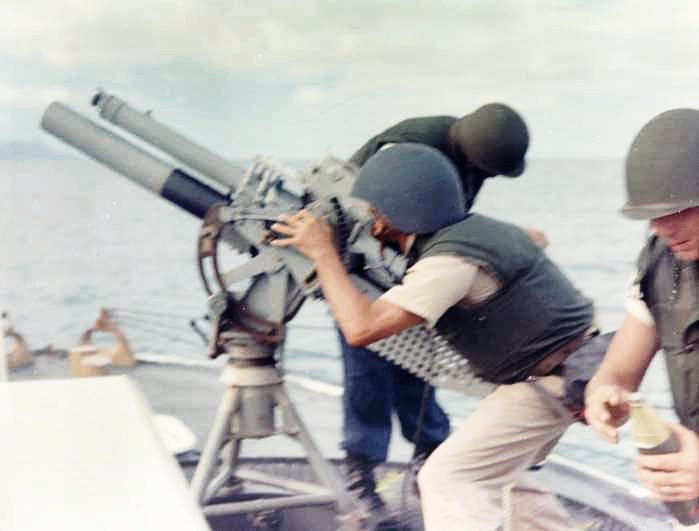
A gun crew on board USCGC Point Comfort (WPB-82317) firing an 81 mm mortar during the bombardment of a suspected Viet Cong staging area one mile behind An Thoi in August 1965

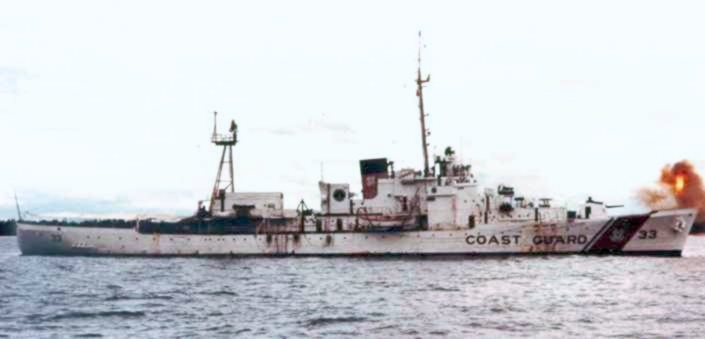
USCGC Duane (WPG-33) shelling targets in Vietnam in 1967, where the Coast Guard was a part of Operation Market Time

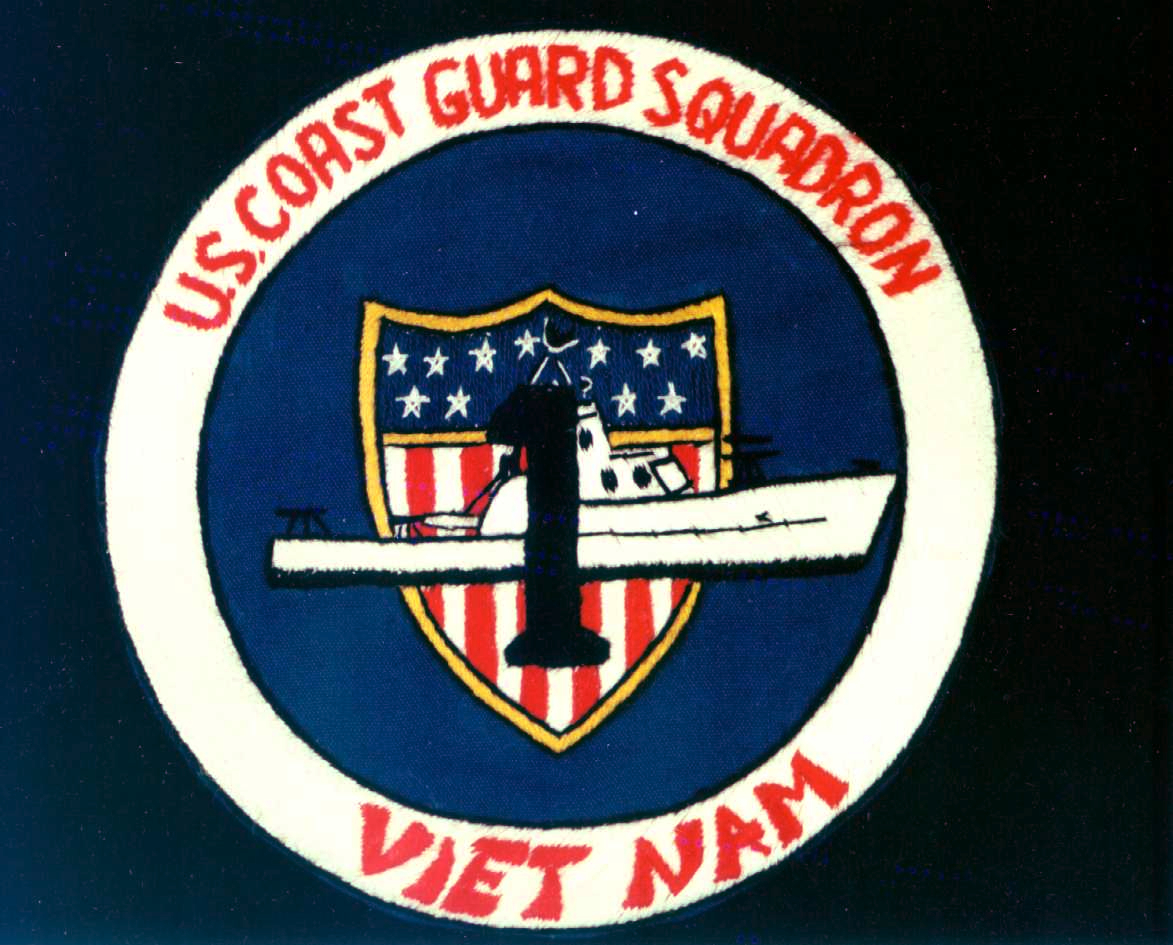
United States Coast Guard Squadron One unit patch during the Vietnam War

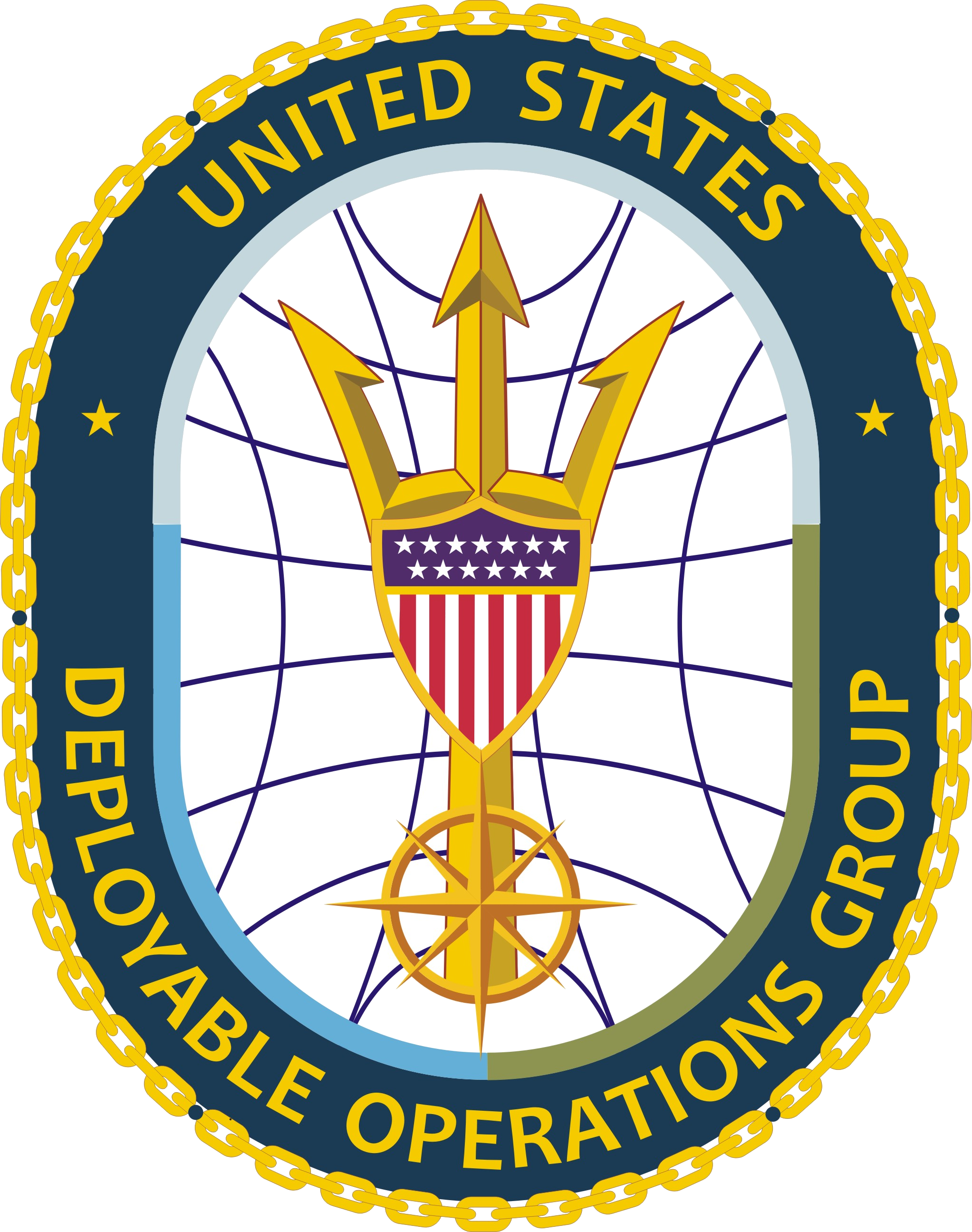
Seal of the United States Coast Guard Deployable Operations Group

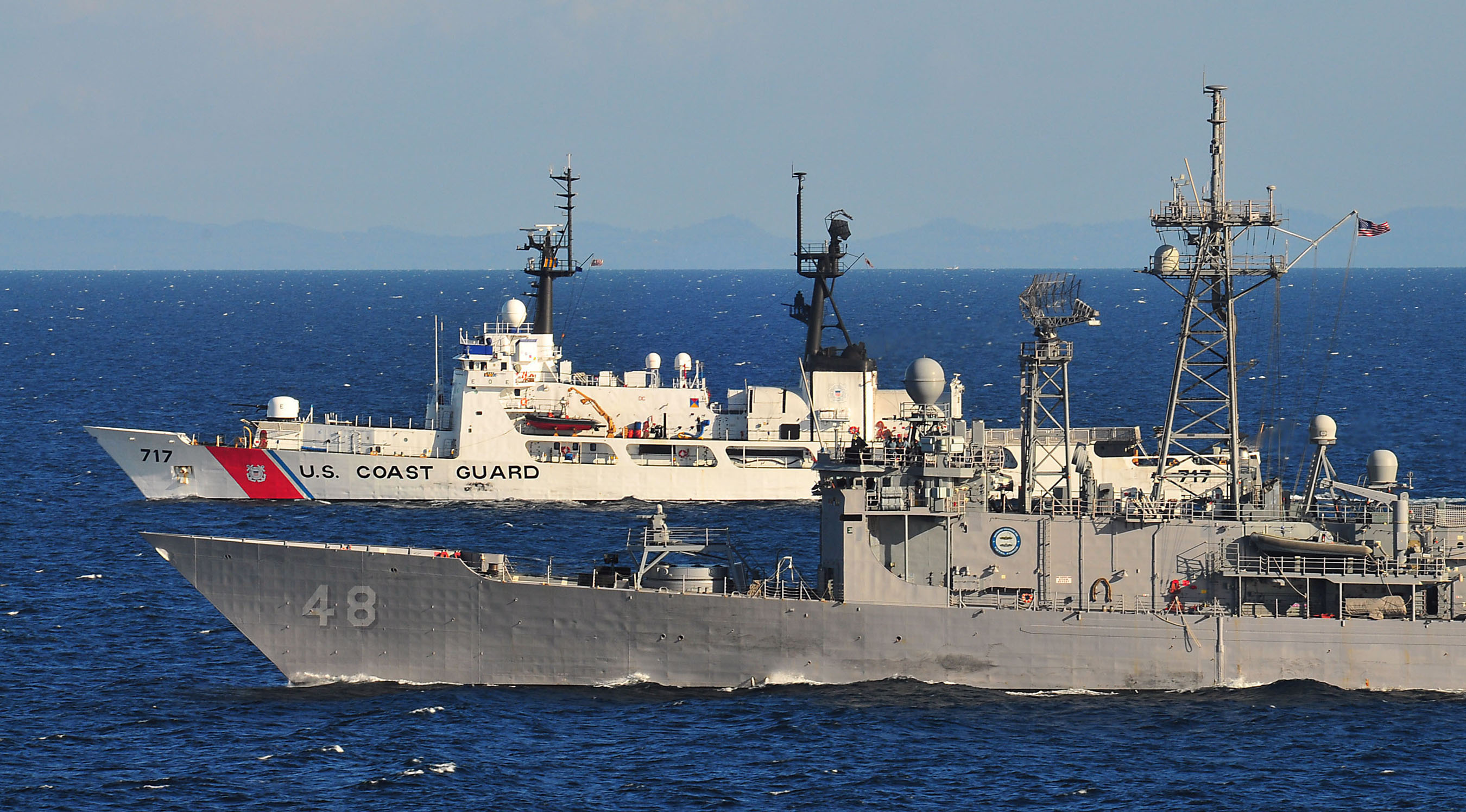
USS Vandegrift (FFG 48) and USCGC Mellon (WHEC-717) cruising side by side in the Java Sea on May 28, 2010

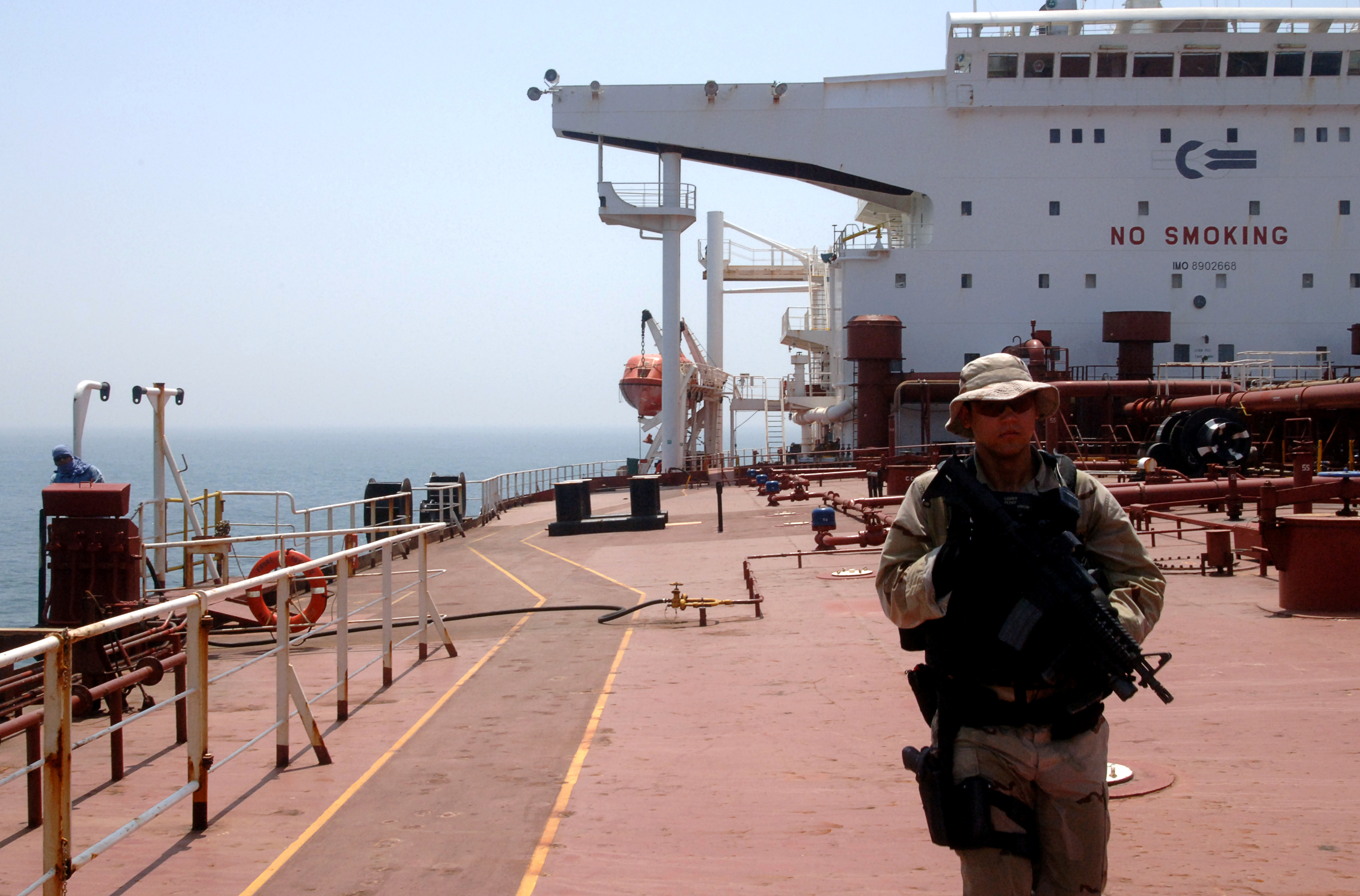
A member of USCG Law Enforcement Detachment (LEDET) 106 performing a security sweep aboard a tanker ship in the North Persian Gulf in July 2007

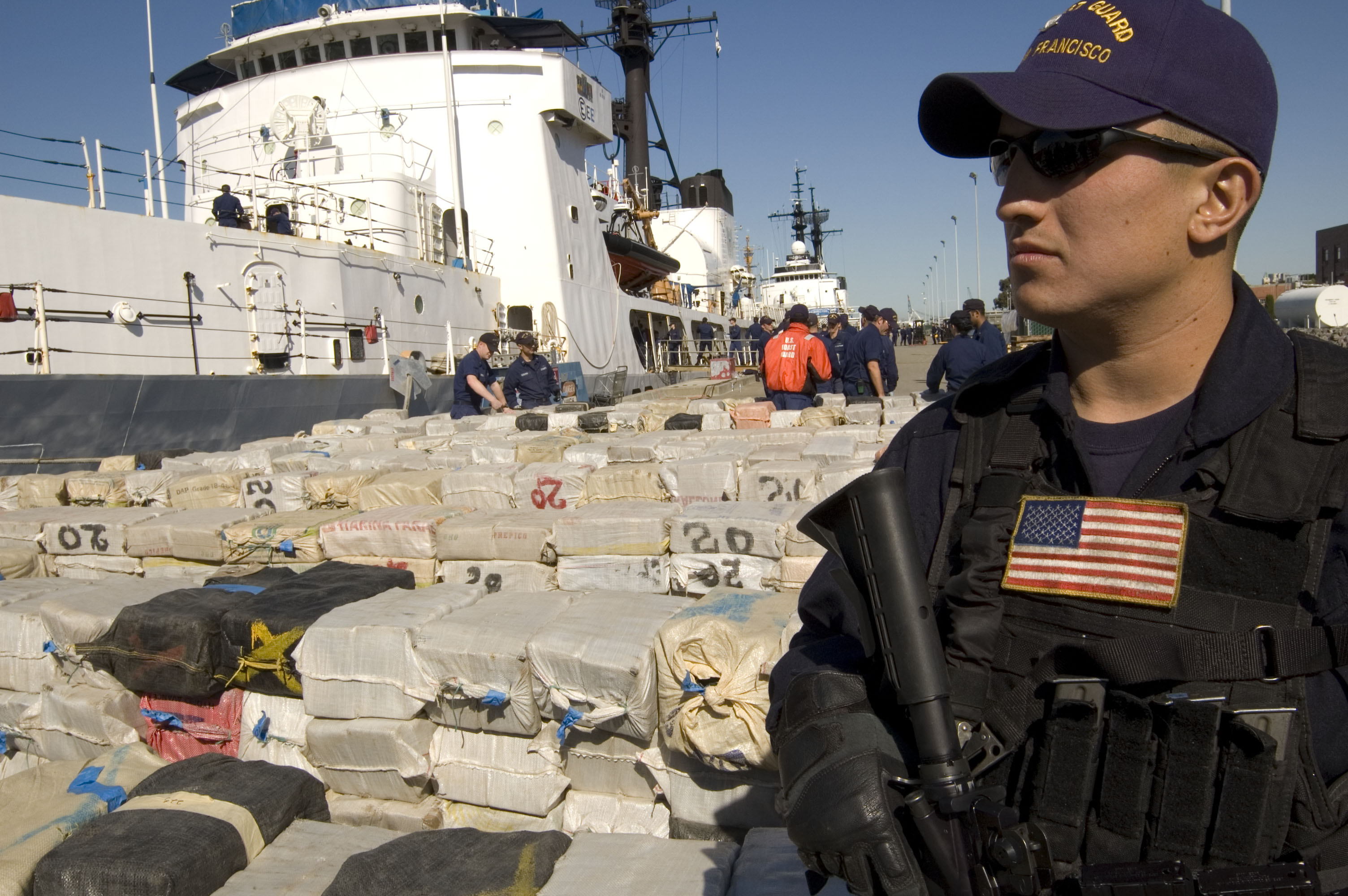
A Coast Guardsman stands guard over more than 40,000 pounds of cocaine worth an estimated $500 million being offloaded from the Cutter Sherman, 23 April 2007.

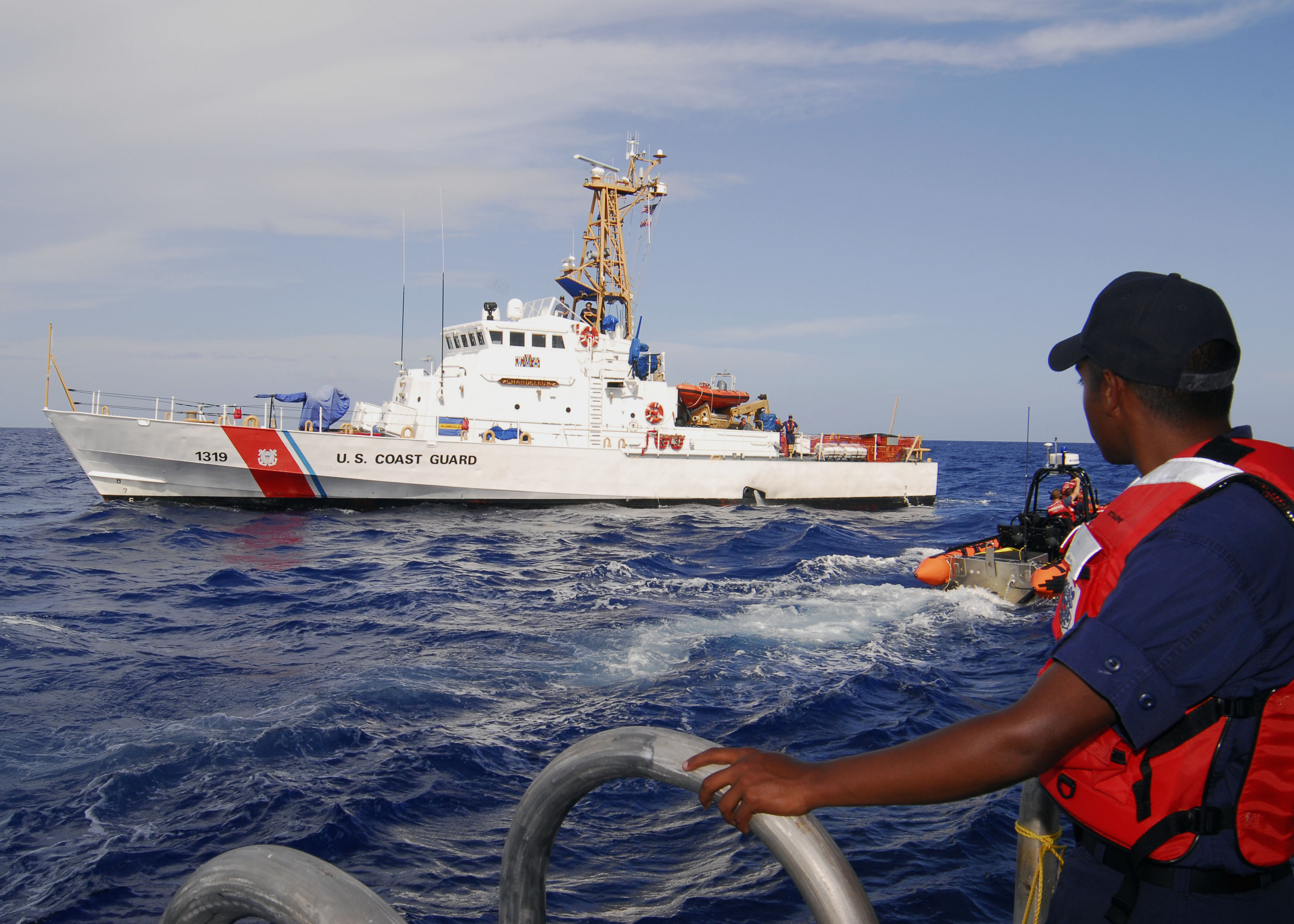
A boatswain's mate keeps watch on a small boat as it heads for the USCGC Chandeleur in 2008

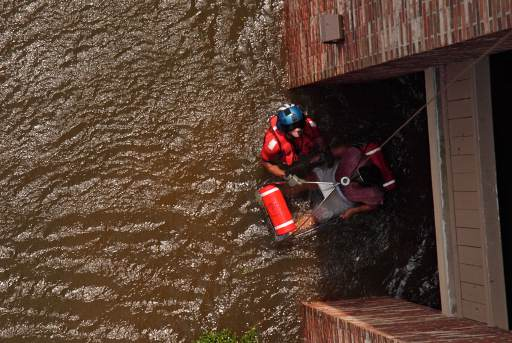
A Coast Guard Aviation Survival Technician assisting with the rescue of a pregnant woman during Hurricane Katrina in 2005

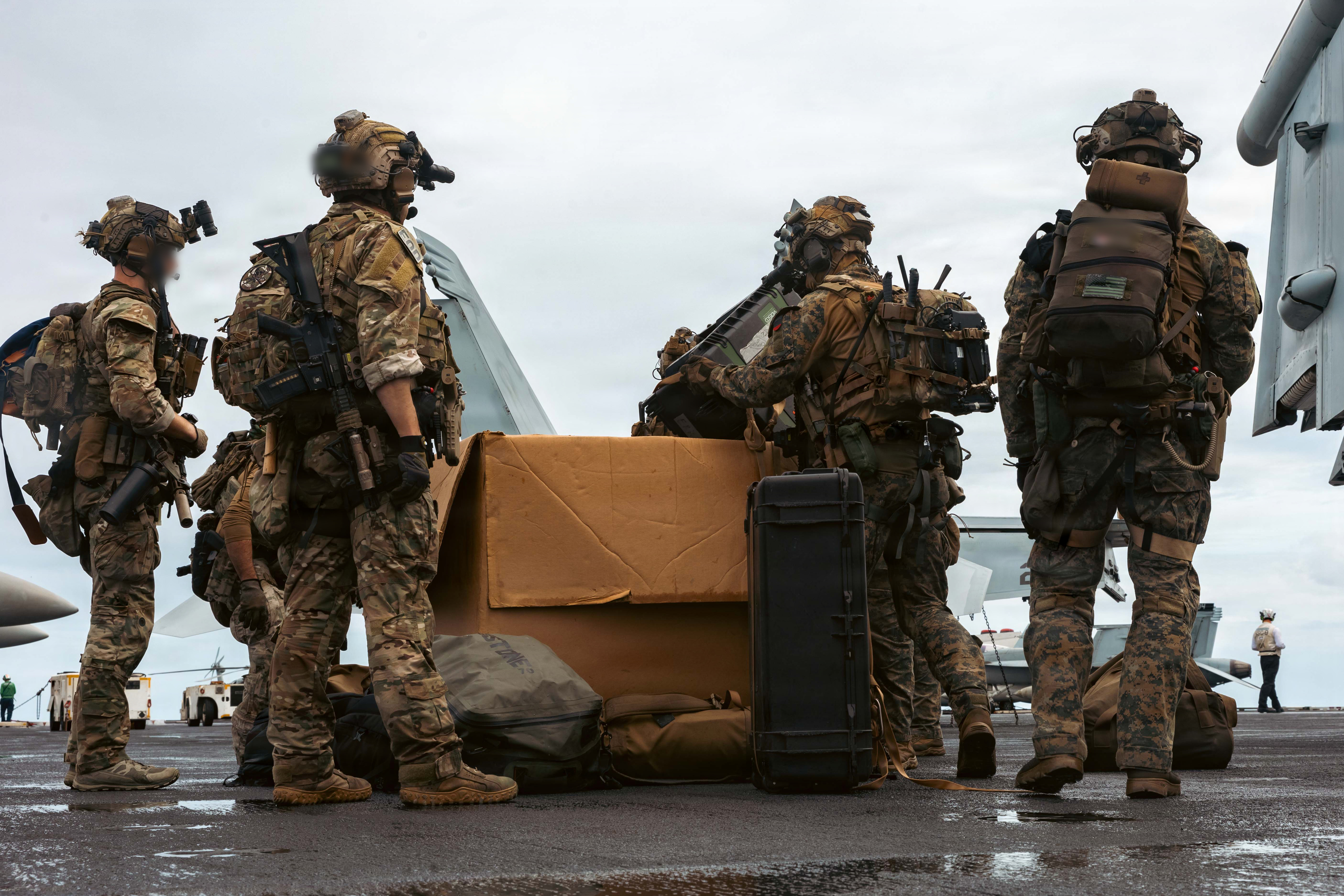
Coast Guardsmen, Marines and Sailors aboard USS Gerald R. Ford, 7 January 2026

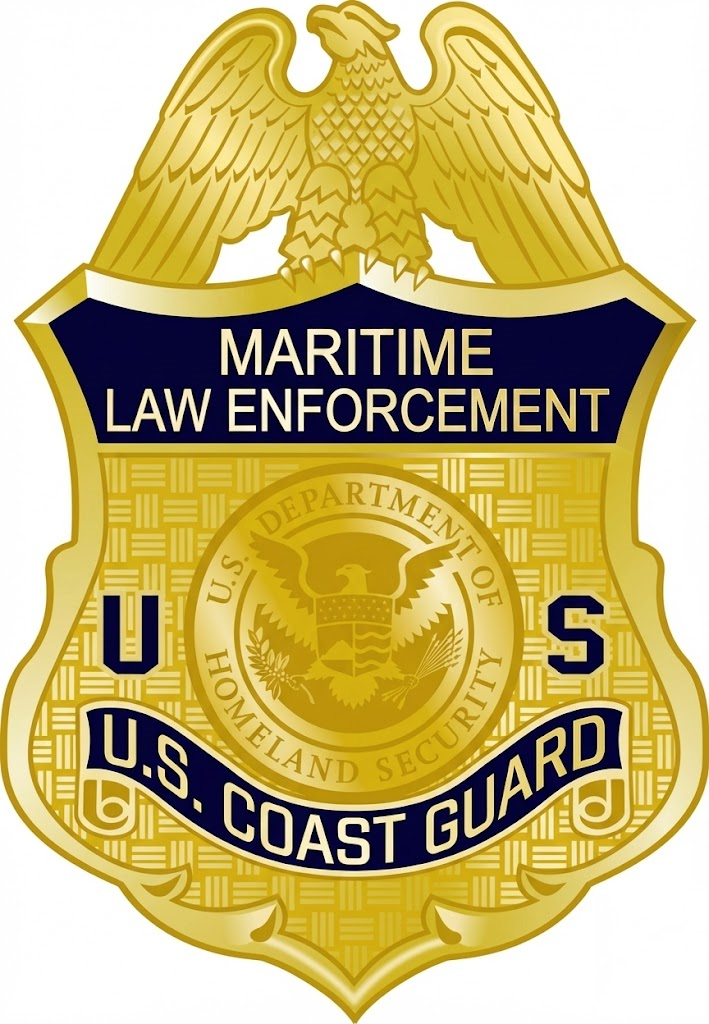
USCG Maritime Law Enforcement unit badge

== Organization ==
The new Department of Homeland Security headquarters complex is on the grounds of the former St. Elizabeths Hospital in the Anacostia section of Southeast Washington, across the Anacostia River from former Coast Guard headquarters.

The fiscal year 2016 budget request for the U.S. Coast Guard was $9.96 billion.

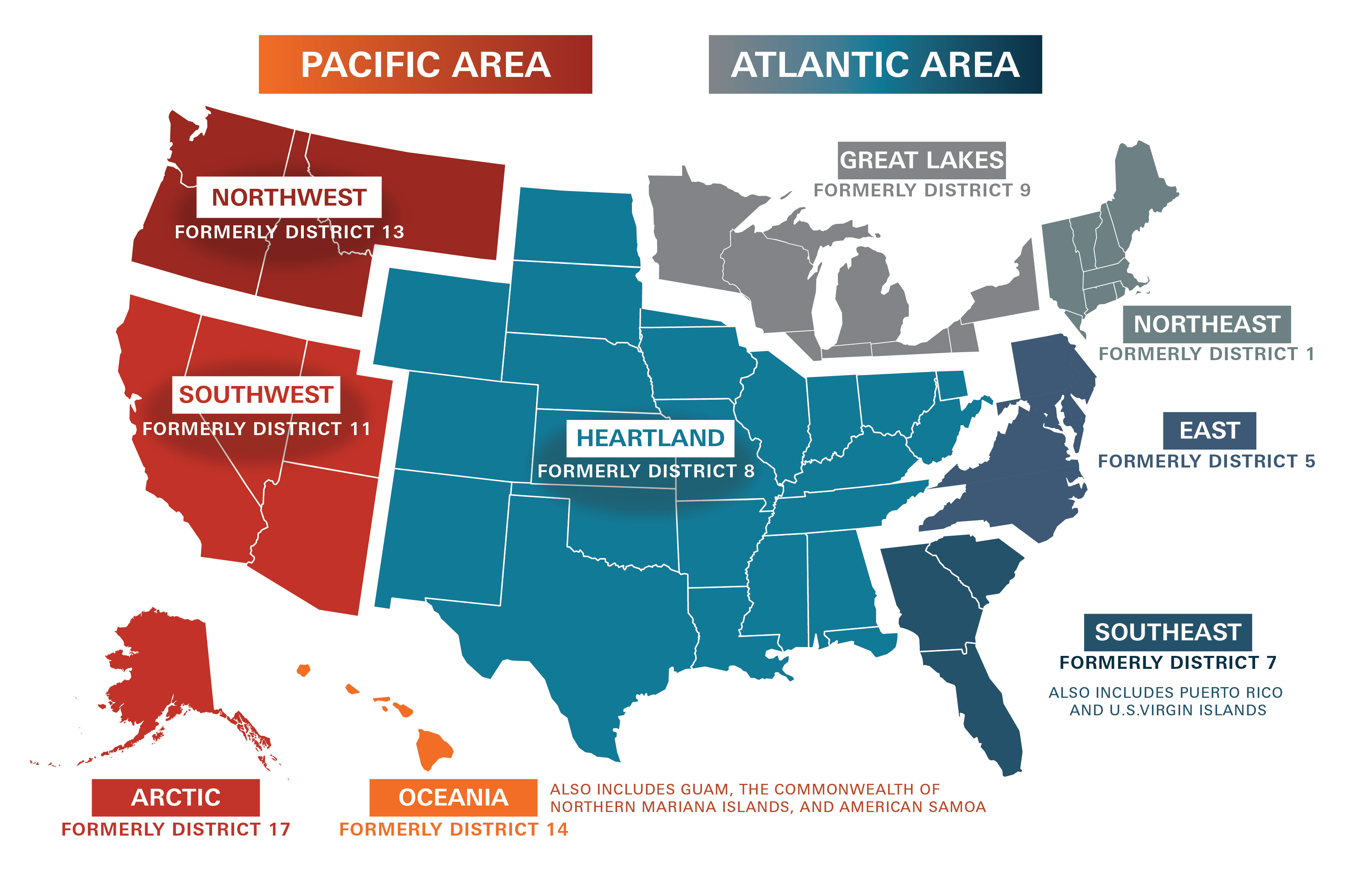
USCG Districts

=== Districts and units ===
The Coast Guard's current district organization is divided into 9 districts which were previously numbered, they were renamed in 2025 for clarity and memorability using geographic area names. Their designations, district office and area of responsibility are as follows:

U.S. Coast Guard districts
District	District office	Area of responsibility
Northeast	Boston, Massachusetts	New England states, eastern New York and northern New Jersey
East	Portsmouth, Virginia	Pennsylvania, southern New Jersey, Delaware, Maryland, Virginia, and North Carolina
Southeast	Miami, Florida	South Carolina, Georgia, eastern Florida, Puerto Rico, and the U.S. Virgin Islands
Heartland	New Orleans, Louisiana	Western Rivers of the U.S. and the Gulf of Mexico
Great Lakes	Cleveland, Ohio	Great Lakes
Southwest	Alameda, California	California, Arizona, Nevada, and Utah
Northwest	Seattle, Washington	Oregon, Washington, Idaho and Montana
Oceania	Honolulu, Hawaii	Hawaii and Pacific territories
Arctic	Juneau, Alaska	Alaska

==== Former U.S. Coast Guard Districts ====
Previously the U.S. Coast Guard had two additional districts, the 15th and 16th, which have since been decommissioned. The 15th district previously encompassed the waters around the Panama Canal Zone, as well as the canal itself. The 16th district was formerly the Philippines.

=== Shore establishments ===
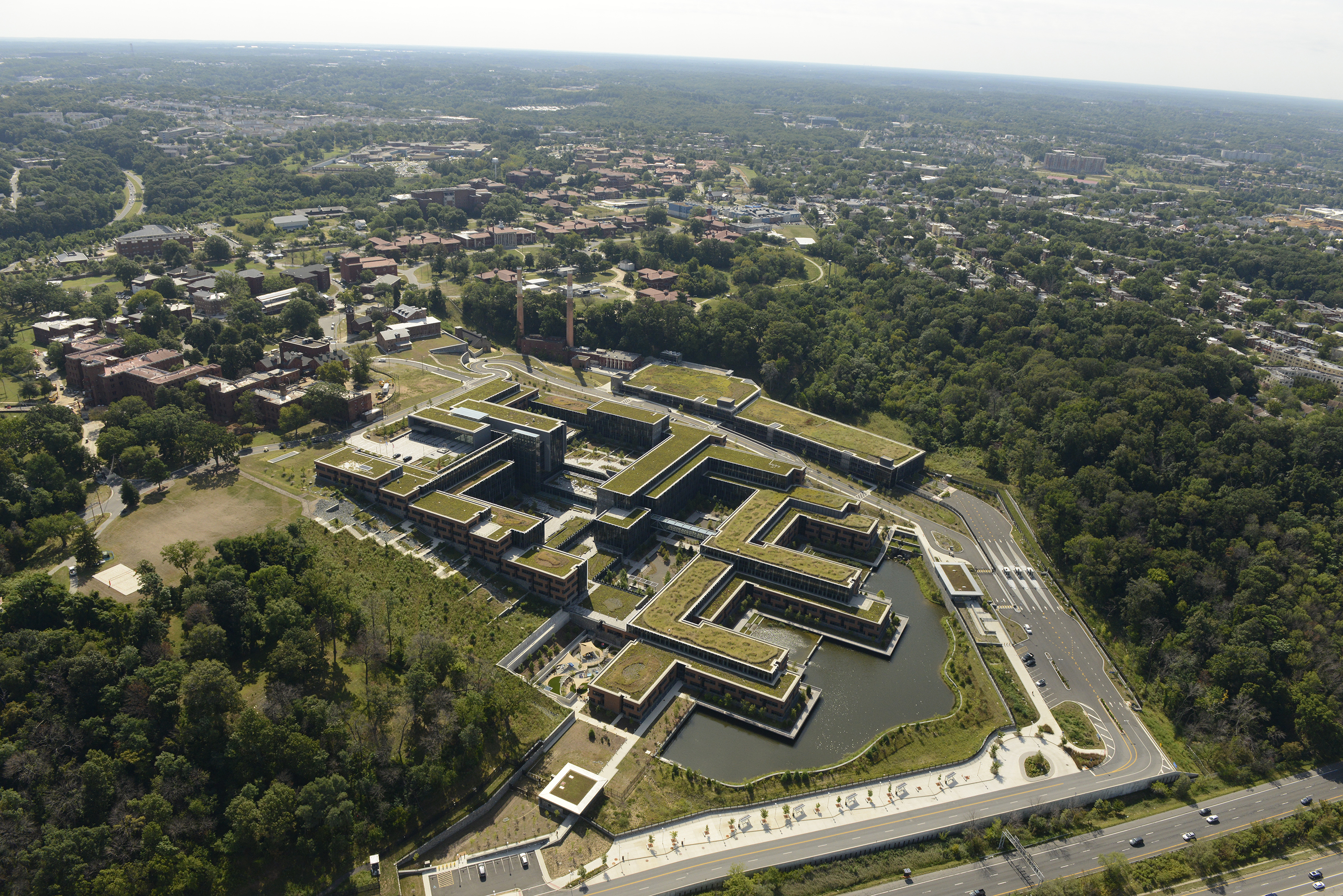
The Douglas A. Munro Coast Guard Headquarters building in St. Elizabeths West Campus

Shore establishment commands exist to support and facilitate the mission of the sea and air assets and Coastal defense. U.S. Coast Guard Headquarters is located in Southeast Washington, D.C. Examples of other shore establishment types are Coast Guard Sectors (which may include Coast Guard Bases), Surface Forces Logistics Center (SFLC), Coast Guard Stations, Coast Guard Air Stations, and the United States Coast Guard Yard. Training centers are included in the shore establishment commands. The military college for the USCG is called the United States Coast Guard Academy which trains both new officers through a four year program and enlisted personnel joining the ranks of officers through a 17 week program called Officer Candidate School (OCS). Abbreviated TRACEN, the other Training Centers include Training Center Cape May for enlisted bootcamp, Training Center Petaluma and Training Center Yorktown for enlisted "A" schools and "C" schools, and Coast Guard Aviation Technical Training Center and Coast Guard Aviation Training Center Mobile for aviation enlisted "A" school, "C" schools, and pilot officer training. On 5 June 2026, the Coast Guard opened the Enlisted Training Center of Excellence at Coast Guard Training Center Birmingham-Southern.

== Personnel ==
The Coast Guard has a total workforce of 87,569. The formal name for a uniformed member of the Coast Guard is "coast guardsman", irrespective of gender. "Coastie" is an informal term commonly used to refer to current or former Coast Guard personnel. In 2008, the term "guardian" was introduced as an alternative but was later dropped. Admiral Robert J. Papp Jr. stated that it was his belief that no Commandant had the authority to change what members of the Coast Guard are called as the term coast guardsman is found in Title 14 USC, which established the Coast Guard in 1915. (Note: The term Coast Guardsman is the official term used by the U.S. Coast Guard to refer to a member regardless of the person's gender. In an ALCOAST message effective 1 December 2011 the Commandant, Admiral Papp, directed that the language of the Guardian Ethos be superseded by the Coast Guard Ethos in an effort to use terminology that would help with the identity of personnel serving in the Coast Guard. The term Coast Guardsman is the correct form of address used in Title 14 USC and is the form that has been used historically.) "Team Coast Guard" refers to the four components of the Coast Guard as a whole: Regular, Reserve, Auxiliary, and Coast Guard civilian employees.

=== Commissioned officers ===
Commissioned officers in the Coast Guard hold pay grades ranging from O-1 to O-10 and have the same rank structure as the Navy. Officers holding the rank of ensign (O-1) through lieutenant commander (O-4) are considered junior officers, commanders (O-5) and captains (O-6) are considered senior officers, and rear admirals (O-7) through admirals (O-10) are considered flag officers. The commandant of the Coast Guard and the vice commandant of the Coast Guard are the only members of the Coast Guard authorized to hold the rank of admiral.

The Coast Guard does not have medical officers or chaplains of its own. Instead, chaplains from the U.S. Navy, as well as officers from the U.S. Public Health Service Commissioned Corps are assigned to the Coast Guard to perform chaplain-related functions and medical-related functions, respectively. These officers wear Coast Guard uniforms but replace the Coast Guard insignia with that of their own service.

The Navy and Coast Guard share identical officer rank insignia except that Coast Guard officers wear a gold Coast Guard Shield in lieu of a line star or staff corps officer insignia.

Commissioned officer grade structure of the United States Coast Guard
US DoD Pay Grade	O-10	O-9	O-8	O-7	O-6	O-5	O-4	O-3	O-2	O-1
NATO Code	OF-9	OF-8	OF-7	OF-6	OF-5	OF-4	OF-3	OF-2	OF-1
Collar insignia
Shoulder insignia
Sleeve insignia
Title	Admiral	Vice admiral	Rear admiral	Rear admiral (lower half)	Captain	Commander	Lieutenant commander	Lieutenant	Lieutenant (junior grade)	Ensign
Abbreviation	ADM	VADM	RADM	RDML	CAPT	CDR	LCDR	LT	LTJG	ENS

=== Warrant officers ===
Highly qualified enlisted personnel in pay grades E-6 through E-9 with a minimum of eight years' experience can compete each year for appointment as warrant officers (WO). Successful candidates are chosen by a board and then commissioned as chief warrant officer two (CWO2) in one of twenty-one specialties. Over time, chief warrant officers may be promoted to chief warrant officer three (CWO3) and chief warrant officer four (CWO4). The ranks of warrant officer (WO1) and chief warrant officer five (CWO5) are not currently used in the Coast Guard. Chief warrant officers may also compete for the Chief Warrant Officer to Lieutenant Program. If selected, the warrant officer will be promoted to lieutenant (O-3E). The "E" designates over four years' active duty service as a warrant officer or enlisted member and entitles the member to a higher rate of pay than other lieutenants.

Warrant officer grade structure of the United States Coast Guard Note: Crossed anchors in the graphics indicate a rating of Boatswain's Mate
US DoD Pay Grade	W-4	W-3	W-2
NATO Code	WO-4	WO-3	WO-2
Collar insignia
Shoulder insignia
Sleeve insignia
Title	Chief Warrant Officer 4	Chief Warrant Officer 3	Chief Warrant Officer 2
Abbreviation	CWO-4	CWO-3	CWO-2

=== Enlisted personnel ===
Enlisted members of the Coast Guard have pay grades from E-1 to E-9 and also follow the same rank structure as the Navy. Enlisted members in pay grades of E-4 and higher are considered petty officers and follow career development paths very similar to those of Navy petty officers.

Petty officers in pay grade E-7 and higher are chief petty officers and must attend the Coast Guard Chief Petty Officer Academy, or an equivalent Department of Defense school, in order to be advanced to pay grade E-8. The basic themes of the school are:

- Professionalism
- Leadership
- Communications
- Systems thinking and lifelong learning

Enlisted rank insignia is also nearly identical to Navy enlisted insignia. The Coast Guard shield replacing the petty officer's eagle on collar and cap devices for petty officers or enlisted rating insignia for seamen qualified as a "designated striker". Group Rate marks (stripes) for junior enlisted members (E-3 and below) also follow Navy convention with white for seaman, red for fireman, and green for airman. In a departure from the Navy conventions, all petty officers E-6 and below wear red chevrons and all chief petty officers wear gold.

Enlisted and non-commissioned officer grade structure of the United States Coast Guard Note: Crossed anchors in the graphics indicate a rating of Boatswain's Mate
U.S. DoD Pay grade	E-9 Special	E-9			E-8	E-7	E-6	E-5	E-4	E-3	E-2	E-1
NATO Code	OR-9				OR-8	OR-7	OR-6	OR-5	OR-4	OR-3	OR-2	OR-1
Collar insignia
Sleeve insignia
Title	Master Chief Petty Officer of the Coast Guard	Gold Badge Command Master Chief Petty Officer (Note: Master Chief Petty Officer of the Coast Guard Reserve Force; Command Master Chief Petty Officers for the Deputy Commandants; Area Command Master Chief Petty Officers)	Command Master Chief Petty Officer	Master Chief Petty Officer	Senior Chief Petty Officer	Chief Petty Officer	Petty Officer First Class	Petty Officer Second Class	Petty Officer Third Class	Seaman	Seaman Apprentice	Seaman Recruit
Abbreviation	MCPOCG	CMC	CMC	MCPO	SCPO	CPO	PO1	PO2	PO3	SN	SA	SR

=== Training ===
==== Officer training ====
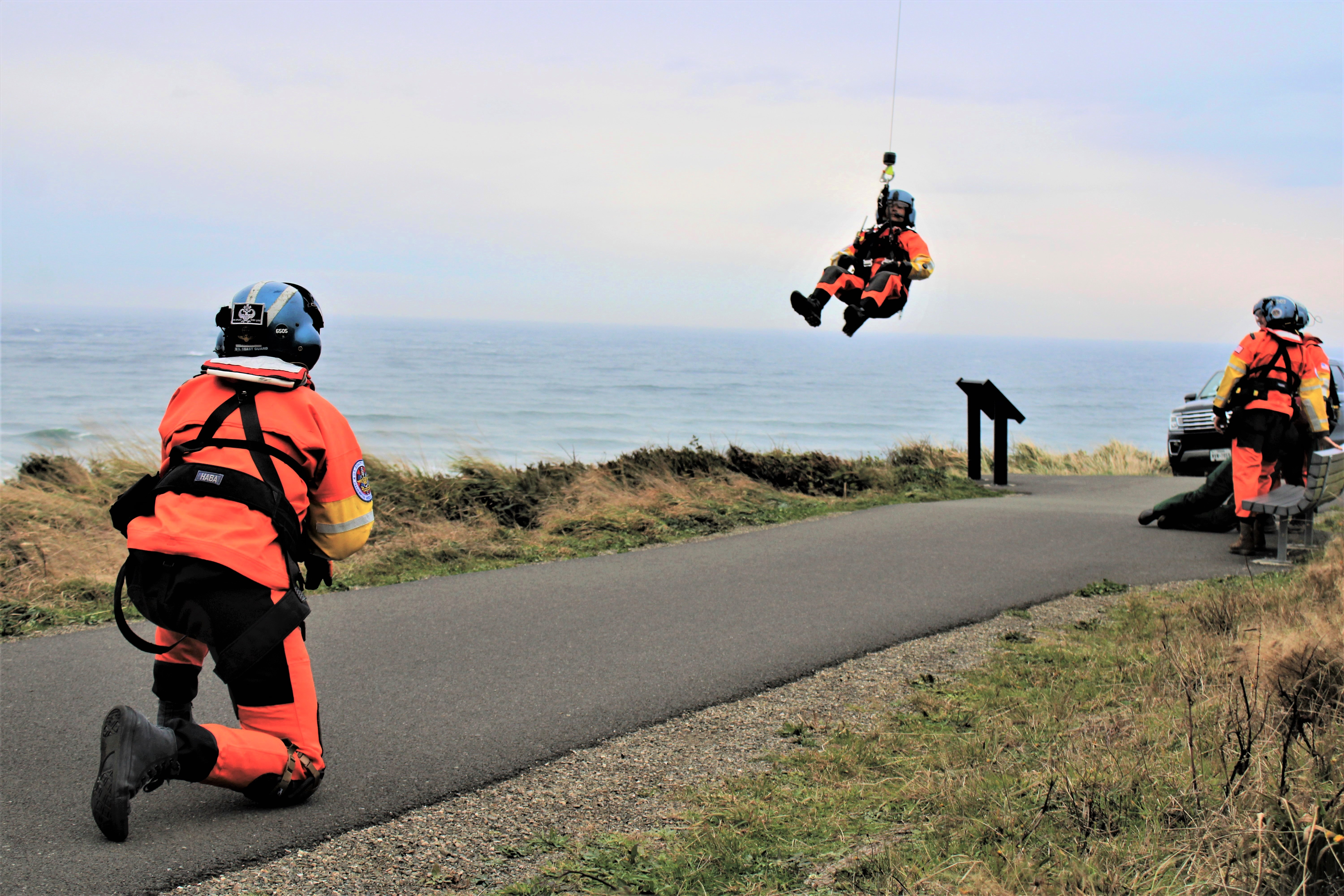
Training exercise at Cape Disappointment State Park, Washington

The U.S. Coast Guard Academy is a four-year service academy located in New London, Connecticut. Approximately 200 cadets graduate each year, receiving a Bachelor of Science degree and a commission as an ensign in the Coast Guard. Graduates are obligated to serve a minimum of five years on active duty. Most graduates are assigned to duty aboard Coast Guard cutters immediately after graduation, either as Deck Watch Officers (DWOs) or as Engineer Officers in Training (EOITs). Smaller numbers are assigned directly to flight training at Naval Air Station Pensacola, Florida or to shore duty at Coast Guard Sector, District, or Area headquarters units.

In addition to the Academy, prospective officers, who already hold a college degree, may enter the Coast Guard through Officer Candidate School (OCS), also located at the Coast Guard Academy. OCS is a 17-week course of instruction that prepares candidates to serve effectively as officers in the Coast Guard. In addition to indoctrinating students into a military lifestyle, OCS provides a wide range of highly technical information necessary to perform the duties of a Coast Guard officer.

Graduates of OCS are usually commissioned as ensigns, but some with advanced graduate degrees may enter as lieutenants (junior grade) or lieutenants. Graduating OCS officers entering active duty are required to serve a minimum of three years, while graduating reserve officers are required to serve four years. Graduates may be assigned to a cutter, flight training, a staff job, or an operations ashore billet. OCS is the primary channel through which the Coast Guard enlisted grades ascend to the commissioned officer corps. Unlike the other military services, the Coast Guard does not have a Reserve Officers' Training Corps (ROTC) program. However, the Coast Guard Auxiliary offers the Coast Guard Auxiliary University Programs (AUP), which provides college students with leadership training and experience in Coast Guard activities, though participation does not guarantee a commission. The Coast Guard also operates the Select Reserve Direct Commission program, for prospective candidates interested serving as a Coast Guard Reserve Officer.

Lawyers, engineers, intelligence officers, military aviators holding commissions in other branches of the U.S. Armed Forces requesting interservice transfers to the Coast Guard, graduates of maritime academies, and certain other individuals may also receive an officer's commission in the Coast Guard through the Direct Commission Officer (DCO) program. Depending on the specific program and the background of the individual, the course is three, four or five weeks long. The first week of the five-week course is an indoctrination week. The DCO program is designed to commission officers with highly specialized professional training or certain kinds of previous military experience.

==== Recruit training ====
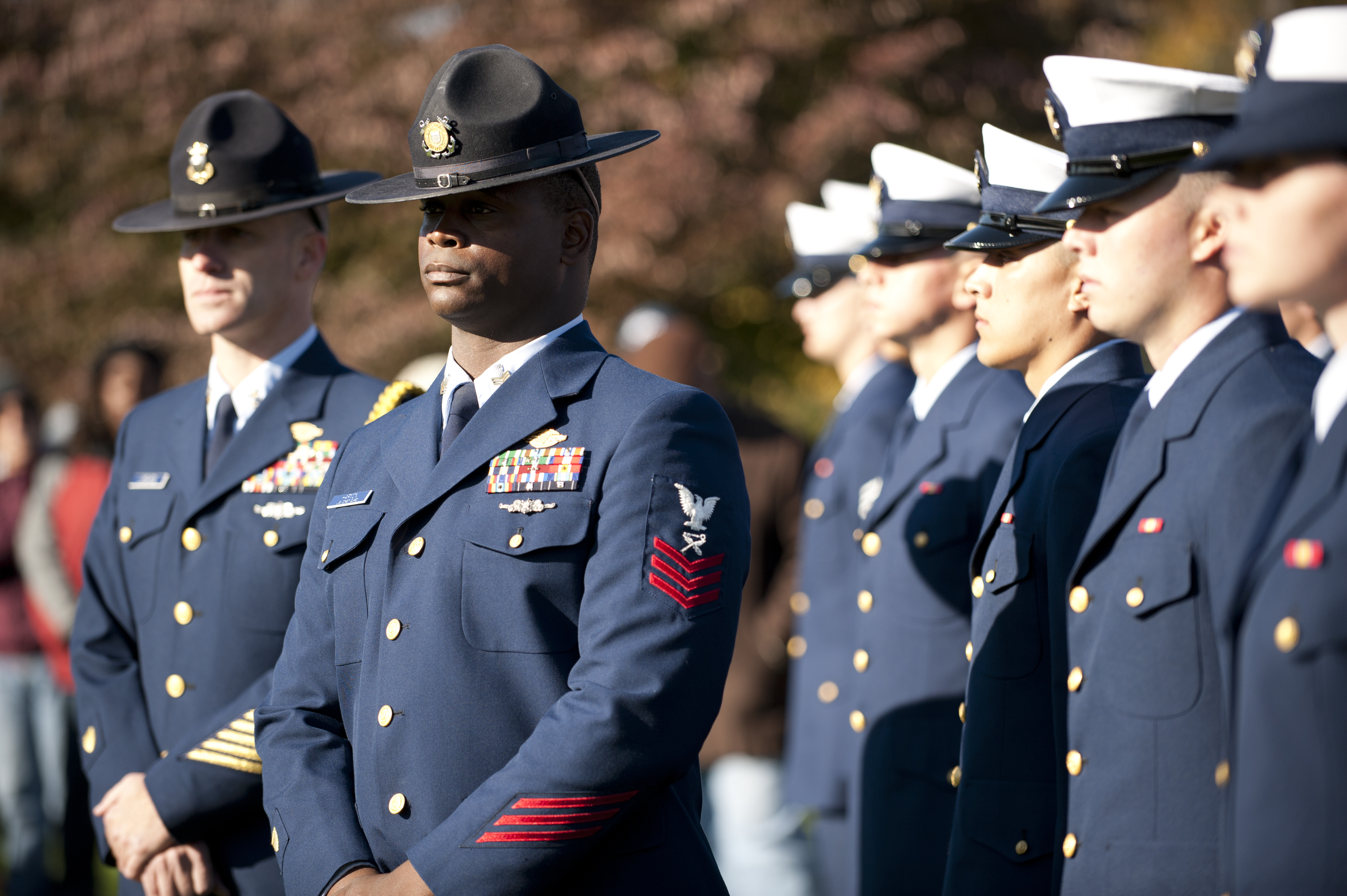
Recruit companies visiting Arlington National Cemetery for their one day of off-base liberty, which is their only break in an eight-week boot camp at the Coast Guard Training Center in Cape May, New Jersey

Newly enlisted personnel are sent to eight weeks of recruit training at Coast Guard Training Center Cape May in Cape May, New Jersey. New recruits arrive at Sexton Hall and remain there for three days of initial processing which includes haircuts, vaccinations, uniform issue, and other necessary entrance procedures. During this initial processing period, the new recruits are led by temporary company commanders. These temporary company commanders are tasked with teaching the new recruits how to march and preparing them to enter into their designated company. The temporary company commanders typically do not enforce any physical activity such as push ups or crunches. When the initial processing is complete, the new seaman recruits are introduced to their permanent company commanders who will remain with them until the end of training. There is typically a designated lead company commander and two support company commanders. The balance of the eight-week boot camp is spent in learning teamwork and developing physical skills. An introduction of how the Coast Guard operates with special emphasis on the Coast Guard's core values is an important part of the training.

The current nine Recruit Training Objectives are:

- Self-discipline
- Military skills
- Marksmanship
- Vocational skills and academics
- Military bearing
- Physical fitness and wellness
- Water survival and swim qualifications
- Esprit de corps
- Core values (Honor, Respect, and Devotion to Duty)

==== Service schools ====
Following graduation from recruit training, most members are sent to their first unit while they await orders to attend advanced training in Class "A" Schools. At "A" schools, Coast Guard enlisted personnel are trained in their chosen rating; rating is a Coast Guard and Navy term for enlisted skills synonymous with the Army's and Marine Corps' military occupation codes (MOS) and Air Force's Air Force Specialty Code (AFSC). Members who earned high ASVAB scores or who were otherwise guaranteed an "A" School of choice while enlisting may go directly to their "A" School upon graduation from Boot Camp.

=== Civilian personnel ===
The Coast Guard employs over 8,577 civilians in over two hundred different job types including Coast Guard Investigative Service special agents, lawyers, engineers, technicians, administrative personnel, tradesmen, and federal firefighters. Civilian employees work at various levels in the Coast Guard to support its various missions.

== Equipment ==
=== Cutters ===
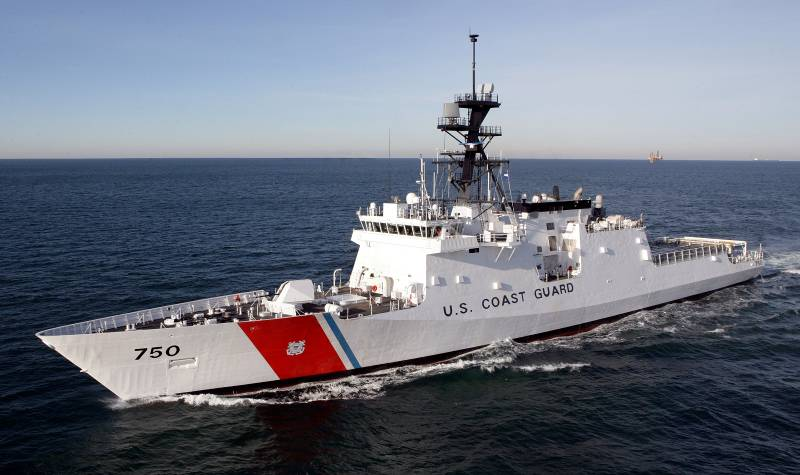
USCGC Bertholf (WMSL-750), the first Legend-class national security cutters

The Coast Guard operates 243 cutters, defined as any vessel more than 65 feet (20 m) long, that has a permanently assigned crew and accommodations for the extended support of that crew.

- National Security Cutter (WMSL): Also known as the Legend-class, these are the Coast Guard's latest class of 418-foot (127 m) cutter. At 418 ft. these are the largest USCG military cutters in active service. One-for-one, Legend-class ships have replaced individually decommissioned 1960s Hamilton-class cutters, also known as High Endurance Cutters (WHEC). A total of eleven were authorized and budgeted; ten of which were commissioned by 2024. The eleventh was cancelled while under construction in 2025.
- Medium Endurance Cutter (WMEC): These are mostly the 210-foot (64 m) Reliance-class, and the 270-foot (82 m) Famous-class cutters, although the 283-foot (86 m) Alex Haley also falls into this category. Primary missions are law enforcement, search and rescue, and military defense. Heritage-class cutters are expected to eventually replace the Reliance- and Famous-class cutters as they are completed.
- Polar-class icebreaker (WAGB): There are three WAGB's used for icebreaking and research though only two, the heavy 399-foot (122 m) Polar Star and the newer medium class 420-foot (130 m) Healy, are active. Polar Sea is located in Seattle, Washington but is not currently in active service. The icebreakers are being replaced with new heavy icebreakers under the Polar icebreaker program, the world's largest coast guard vessel due for delivery in 2025.
- USCGC Storis: A 360-foot (110 m) icebreaker previously used by Shell before being bought by the Coast Guard in December 2024.
- USCGC Eagle: A 295-foot (90 m) sailing barque used as a training ship for Coast Guard Academy cadets and Coast Guard officer candidates. She was originally built in Germany as Horst Wessel, and was seized by the United States as a prize of war in 1945.
- USCGC Mackinaw: A 240-foot (73 m) heavy icebreaker built for operations on the Great Lakes.
- Seagoing Buoy Tender (WLB): These 225-foot (69 m) ships are used to maintain aids to navigation and also assist with law enforcement and search and rescue.
- Coastal Buoy Tender (WLM): The 175-foot (53 m) Keeper-class coastal buoy tenders are used to maintain coastal aids to navigation.
- Sentinel-class cutter (WPC): The 154-foot (47 m) Sentinel-class, also known by its program name, the "Fast Response Cutter"-class and is used for search and rescue work and law enforcement.
- Bay-class icebreaking tug (WTGB): 140-foot (43 m) icebreakers used primarily for domestic icebreaking missions. Other missions include search and rescue, law enforcement, and aids to navigation maintenance.
- Patrol Boats (WPB): There are two classes of WPBs currently in service; the 110-foot (34 m) Island-class patrol boats and the 87-foot (27 m) Marine Protector-class patrol boats
- Small Harbor Tug (WYTL): 65-foot (20 m) small icebreaking tugboats, used primary for ice clearing in domestic harbors in addition to limited search and rescue and law enforcement roles.

=== Boats ===
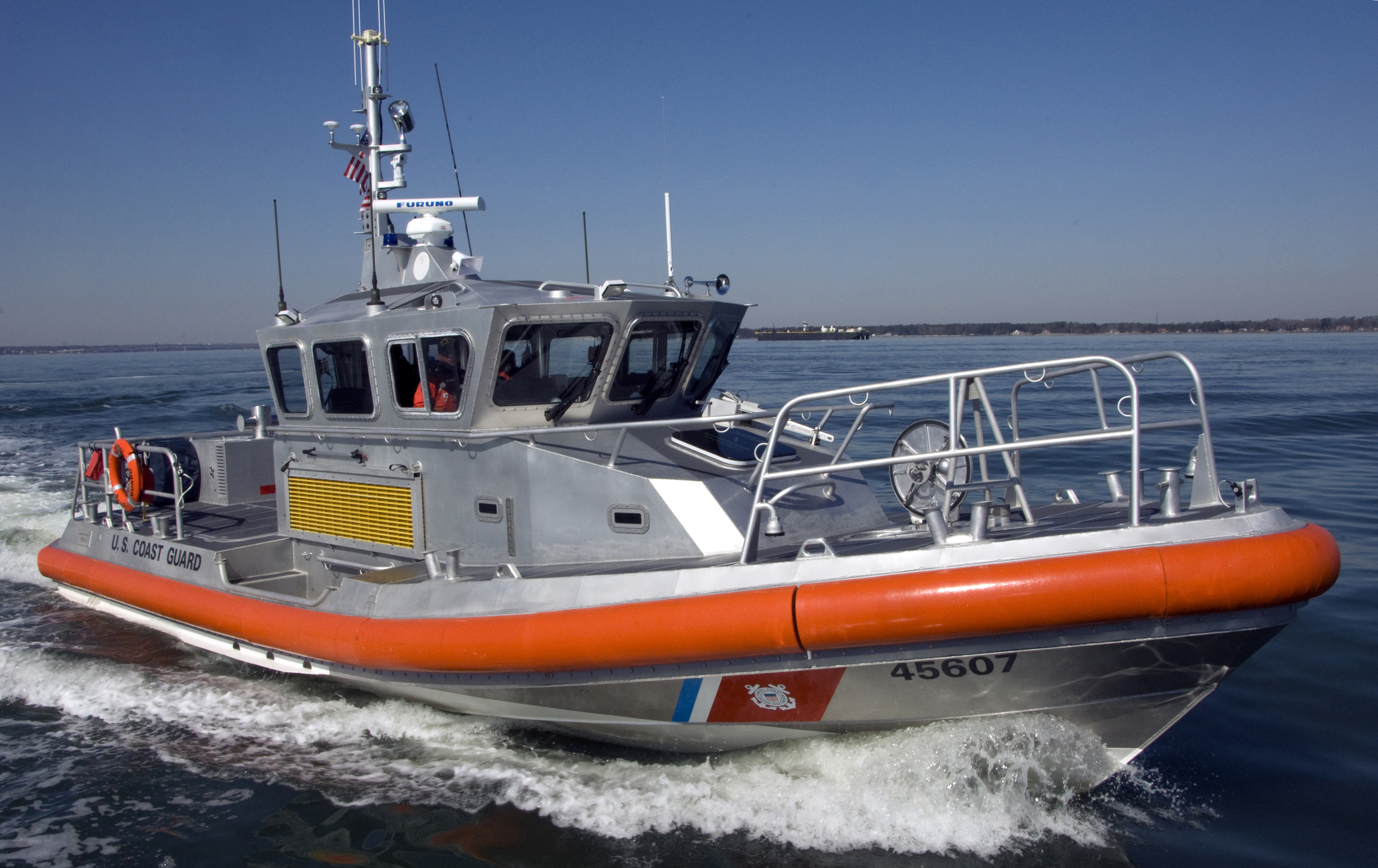
U.S. Coast Guard 45-foot (14 m) Response Boat Medium (RB-M)

The Coast Guard operates about 1,650 boats, defined as any vessel less than 65 feet (20 m) long, which generally operate near shore and on inland waterways.

The Coast Guard boat fleet includes:

- 47-foot Motor Lifeboat (MLB): The Coast Guard's 47-foot (14 m) primary heavy-weather boat used for search and rescue as well as law enforcement and homeland security.
- Response Boat – Medium (RB-M): A new multi-mission 45-foot (14 m) vessel intended to replace the 41-foot (12 m) utility boat. 170 planned
- Deployable Pursuit Boat (DPB): A 38-foot (12 m) launch capable of pursuing fast cocaine smuggling craft.
- Long Range Interceptor (LRI): A 36-foot (11 m) high-speed launch that can be launched from the stern ramps of the larger Deepwater cutters.
- Aids to Navigation Boat (TANB/BUSL/ATON/ANB): Various designs ranging from 26 to 55 feet (7.9 to 16.8 m) used to maintain aids to navigation.
- Special Purpose Craft – Law Enforcement (SPC-LE): Intended to operate in support of specialized law enforcement missions, utilizing three 300 horsepower (220 kW) Mercury Marine engines. The SPC-LE is 33 feet (10 m) long and capable of speeds in excess of 50 knots (93 km/h; 58 mph) and operations more than 30 miles (48 km) from shore.
- 29-foot Response Boat Small II (RBS-II): The successor to the 25-foot RB-S, the RBS-II is a 29 foot (9 m) high speed, multi-mission boat commonly used for search and rescue, port security, and law enforcement. Improvements from the RB-S include improved visibility and modernized electronic chart plotter capabilities.
- 25-foot Transportable Port Security Boat (TPSB): A 25-foot (7.6 m) well-armed boat used by Port Security Units for force protection.
- Special Purpose Craft, Shallow-water (SPC-SW): 24 feet (7.3 m)
- Cutter Boat – Over the Horizon (OTH): A 23-foot (7.0 m) rigid hull inflatable boat used by medium and high endurance cutters and specialized units.
- Short Range Prosecutor (SRP): A 23-foot (7.0 m) rigid hull inflatable boat that can be launched from a stern launching ramp on the National Security Cutters.

=== Aircraft ===
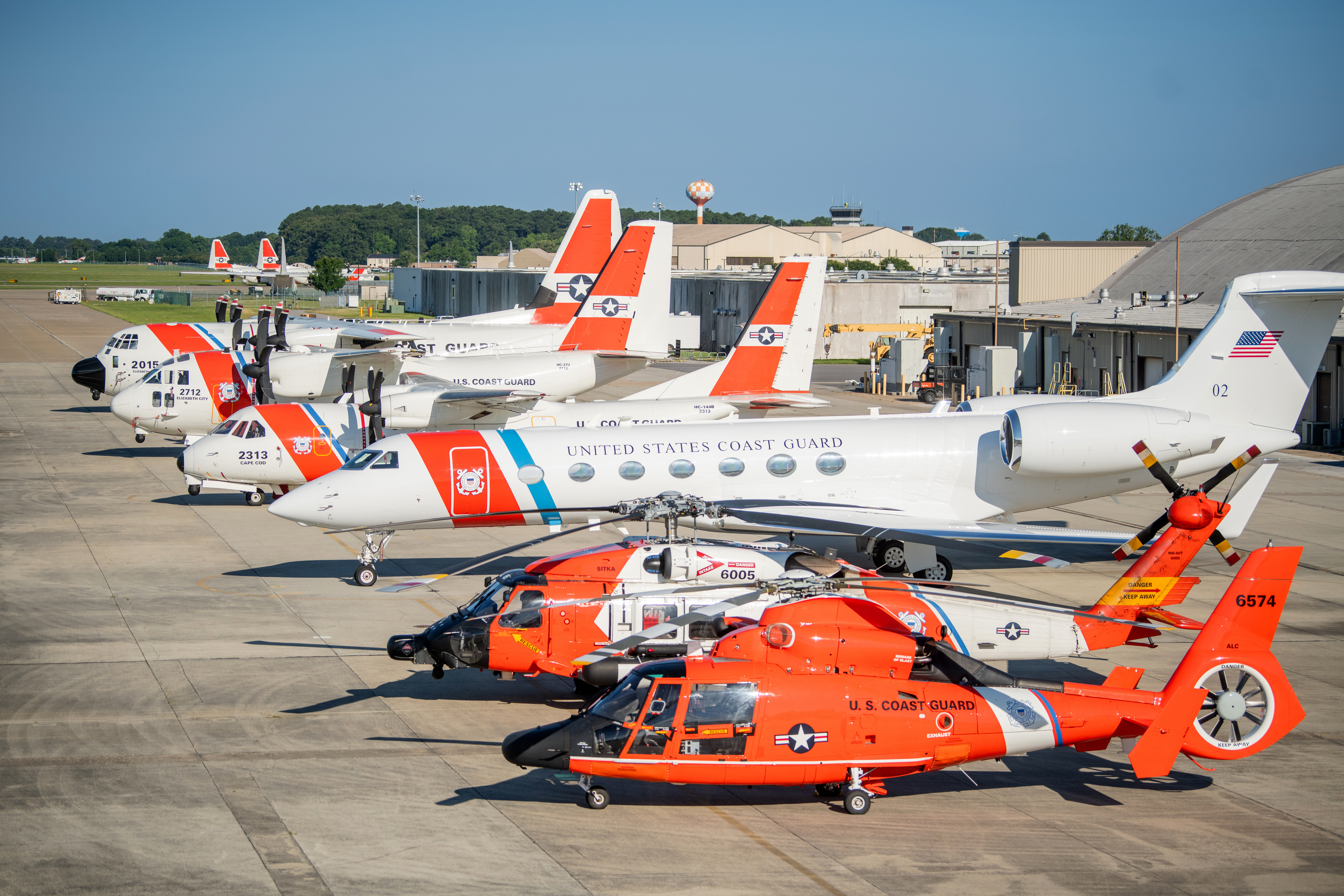
Every aircraft type in the U.S. Coast Guard fleet in June 2024. From left: HC-130J, C-27J, HC-144, C-37B, MH-60T, MH-65E

The Coast Guard operates approximately 201 fixed and rotary wing aircraft from 24 Coast Guard Air Stations throughout the contiguous United States, Alaska, Hawaii, and Puerto Rico. Most of these air stations are tenant activities at civilian airports, several of which are former Air Force Bases and Naval Air Stations, although several are also independent military facilities. Coast Guard Air Stations are also located on active Naval Air Stations, Air National Guard bases, and Army Air Fields.

Coast Guard aviators receive Primary (fixed-wing) and Advanced (fixed or rotary-wing) flight training with their Navy and Marine Corps counterparts at NAS Whiting Field, Florida, and NAS Corpus Christi, Texas, and are considered Naval Aviators. After receiving Naval Aviator Wings, Coast Guard pilots, with the exception of those slated to fly the HC-130, report to U.S. Coast Guard Aviation Training Center, Mobile, Alabama to receive 6–12 weeks of specialized training in the Coast Guard fleet aircraft they will operate. HC-130 pilots report to Little Rock AFB, Arkansas, for joint C-130 training under the auspices of the 314th Airlift Wing of the U.S. Air Force.

Fixed-wing aircraft operate from Air Stations on long-duration missions. Helicopters operate from Air Stations and can deploy on a number of different cutters. Helicopters can rescue people or intercept vessels smuggling migrants or narcotics. Since the terrorist attacks of 11 September 2001, the Coast Guard has developed a more prominent role in national security and now has armed helicopters operating in high-risk areas for the purpose of maritime law enforcement and anti-terrorism.

The Coast Guard is now developing an unmanned aerial vehicle (UAV) program that will utilize the MQ-9 Reaper platform for homeland security and search/rescue operations. To support this endeavor, the Coast Guard has partnered with the Navy and U.S. Customs and Border Protection to study existing/emerging unmanned aerial system (UAS) capabilities within their respective organizations. As these systems mature, research and operational experience gleaned from this joint effort will enable the Coast Guard to develop its own cutter and land-based UAS capabilities.

=== Current aircraft ===
Type	Manufacturer	Origin	Class	Role	Introduced	In service	Notes
C-27J Spartan	Alenia Aeronautica	U.S. Italy	Turboprop	Search and rescue	2014	14	Former Air Force aircraft, acquired in return for the release of seven HC-130H aircraft to the United States Forest Service for use as aerial tankers.
C-37A	Gulfstream	U.S.	Jet	Priority Airlift	1998	1	Priority Airlift for high-ranking members of the Department of Homeland Security and U.S. Coast Guard.
C-37B	Gulfstream	U.S.	Jet	Priority Airlift	2017	1	Priority Airlift for high-ranking members of the Department of Homeland Security and U.S. Coast Guard.
HC-130H Hercules	Lockheed Martin	U.S.	Turboprop	Search and rescue	1974	14	Most have been removed from service and are being replaced by HC-130J aircraft. Seven were turned over to the United States Forest Service to be converted to aerial firefighting tankers.
HC-130J Hercules	Lockheed Martin	U.S.	Turboprop	Search and rescue	2003	12	More on order, currently being manufactured to replace HC-130H.
HC-144A Ocean Sentry	Airbus	U.S. Spain	Turboprop	Search and rescue	2009	15	
HC-144B Minotaur	Airbus	U.S. Spain	Turboprop	Search and rescue	2016	3	Minotaur upgrade of HC-144A aircraft includes advance navigation and search and rescue equipment.
MH-60T Jayhawk	Sikorsky	U.S.	Helicopter	Medium Range Recovery (MRR)	1990	51	may remain in service until 2035
MH-65E Dolphin	Eurocopter	U.S. France	Helicopter	Short Range Recovery (SRR)	1984	46	Upgraded version of MH-65D with advanced avionics and search and rescue equipment

=== Weapons ===
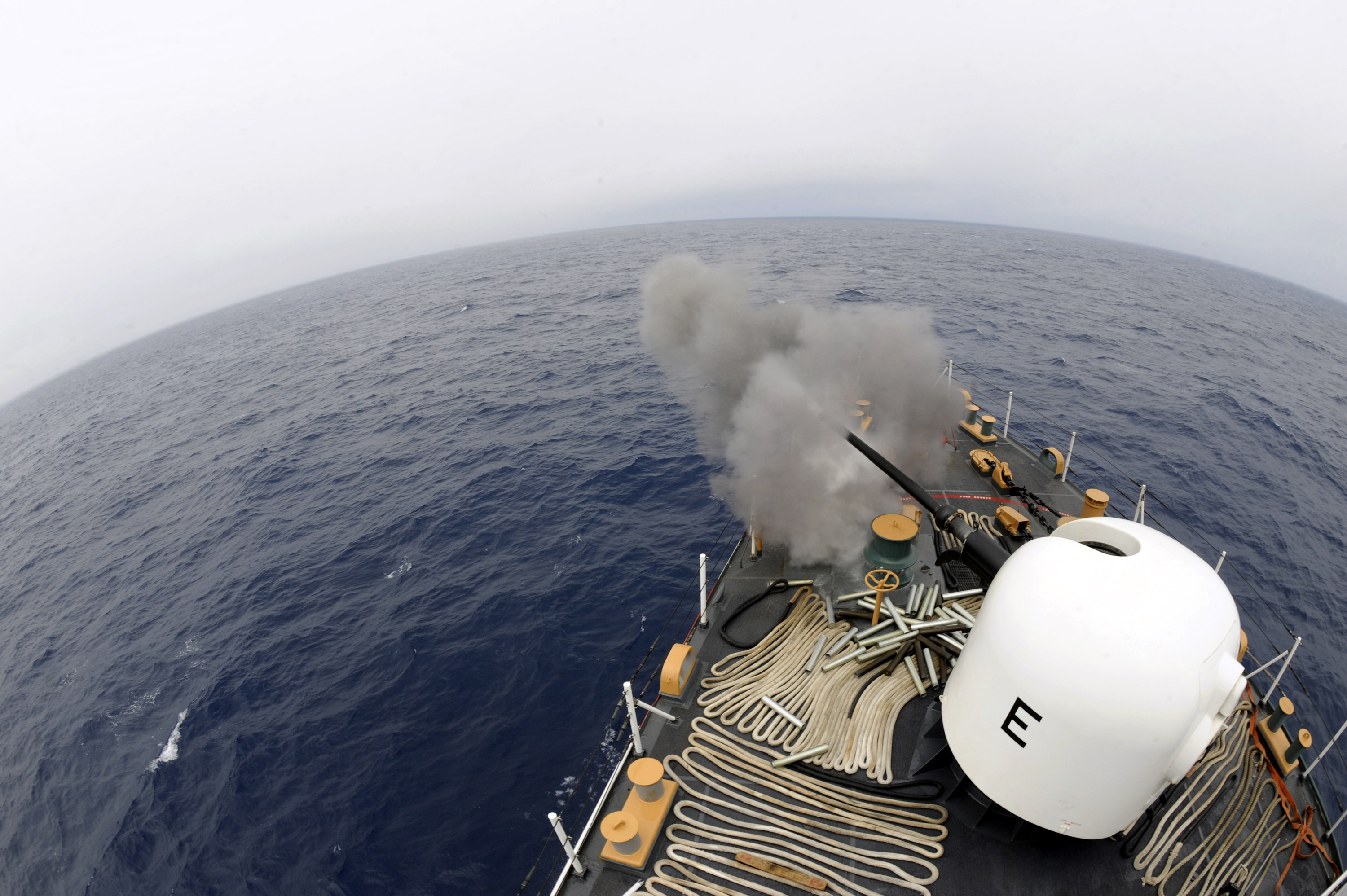
USCGC Legare fire the ship's MK-75 76mm cannon

==== Naval guns ====
Most Coast Guard Cutters have one or more naval gun systems installed, including:

- The Oto Melara 76 mm, a radar-guided computer controlled gun system that is used on Medium Endurance Cutters. The 3-inch gun's high rate of fire and availability of specialized ammunition make it a multi-purpose gun capable of anti-shipping, anti-aircraft, ground support, and short-range anti-missile defense.
- The MK 110 57 mm gun, a radar-guided computer controlled variant of the Bofors 57 mm gun. It is used on the Legend-class cutter, also known as the National Security Cutter (NSC). It is a multi-purpose gun capable of anti-shipping, anti-aircraft, and short-range anti-missile defense. The stealth mount has a reduced radar profile. Also, the gun has a small radar mounted on the gun barrel to measure muzzle velocity for fire control purposes and can change ammunition types instantly due to a dual-feed system. It can also be operated/fired manually using a joystick and video camera (mounted on gun).
- The Mk 38 Mod 0 weapons system consists of an M242 Bushmaster 25mm chain gun and the Mk 88 Mod 0 machine gun mount. A manned system, its gyro-stabilization compensates for the pitching deck. It provides ships with defensive and offensive gunfire capability for the engagement of a variety of surface targets. Designed primarily as a close-range defensive measure, it provides protection against patrol boats, floating mines, and various shore-based targets.
- The Mk 38 Mod 2 weapons system is a remotely operated Mk 38 with an electronic optical sight, laser range-finder, FLIR, a more reliable feeding system, all of which enhance the weapon systems capabilities and accuracy.
- The Phalanx CIWS (pronounced "sea-wiz") is a close-in weapon system for defense against aircraft and anti-ship missiles. it can also be used against a variety of surface targets. Consisting of a radar-guided 20 mm 6-barreled M61 Vulcan cannon mounted on a swiveling base, it is used on the Coast Guard's National Security Cutters. This system can operate autonomously against airborne threats or may be manually operated with the use of electronic optical sight, laser range-finder and FLIR systems against surface targets.
- The Sea PROTECTOR MK50 is a remotely controlled gyro-stabilized M2 .50 caliber heavy machine gun. The sight package includes a daylight video camera, a thermal camera and an eye-safe laser rangefinder operated by a joystick. It is also furnished with a fully integrated fire control system that provides ballistic correction. The Mk50s are used on only four Marine Protector-class Cutters, the USCGC Sea Fox (WPB-87374), USCGC Sea Devil (WPB-87368), USCGC Sea Dragon (WPB-87367) and USCGC Sea Dog (WPB-87373)

==== Small arms and light weapons ====
The U.S. Coast Guard uses a wide variety of small arms and light weapons that include:

Name	Country of origin	Type	Status
Colt Gold Match M1911	United States	Semi-automatic pistol	EIC Competition Use
Colt M16A4	United States	Assault rifle	EIC Competition Use
Glock 19 Gen 5 MOS	Austria	Semi-automatic pistol	Standard issue
Remington 870P	United States	Shotgun	Standard issue
Colt M4	United States	Assault rifle	Standard issue
Close Quarters Battle Receiver	United States	Assault rifle	Standard issue
M14 Tactical	United States	Battle rifle	Standard issue
Mk 11 Mod 2 precision rifle	United States	Sniper rifle	Standard issue
Barrett M107 .50-caliber rifle	United States	Sniper rifle	Used by marksmen from the Helicopter Interdiction Tactical Squadron and Law Enforcement Detachments to disable the engines on fleeing boats.
M240 machine gun	United States	General-purpose machine gun	Standard issue
Mk 19 40mm grenade launcher	United States	Grenade launcher	Standard issue

== Symbols ==
=== Core values ===
The Coast Guard, like the other armed services of the United States, has a set of core values that serve as basic ethical guidelines for all Coast Guard active duty, reservists, auxiliarists, and civilians. The Coast Guard Core Values are:

Honor: Integrity is our standard. We demonstrate uncompromising ethical conduct and moral behavior in all of our personal actions. We are loyal and accountable to the public trust.
Respect: We value our diverse workforce. We treat each other with fairness, dignity, and compassion. We encourage individual opportunity and growth. We encourage creativity through empowerment. We work as a team.
Devotion to Duty: We are professionals, military and civilian, who seek responsibility, accept accountability, and are committed to the successful achievement of our organizational goals. We exist to serve. We serve with pride.

=== The Guardian Ethos ===
In 2008, the Coast Guard introduced the Guardian Ethos. As the commandant, Admiral Allen noted in a message to all members of the Coast Guard: [The Ethos] "defines the essence of the Coast Guard," and is the "contract the Coast Guard and its members make with the nation and its citizens."

=== The Coast Guard Ethos ===
In an ALCOAST message effective 1 December 2011 the Commandant, Admiral Papp, directed that the language of Guardian Ethos be superseded by the Coast Guard Ethos in an effort to use terminology that would help with the identity of personnel serving in the Coast Guard. The term coast guardsman is the correct form of address used in Title 14 USC and is the form that has been used historically. This changed the line in the Guardian Ethos "I am a Guardian." to become "I am a Coast Guardsman."

The Ethos is:

In Service to our Nation
With Honor, Respect, and Devotion to Duty
We protect
We defend
We save
We are Semper Paratus
We are the United States Coast Guard

— The Coast Guard Ethos

=== Creed of the United States Coast Guardsman ===
The "Creed of the United States Coast Guardsman" was written by Vice Admiral Harry G. Hamlet, who served as Commandant of the Coast Guard from 1932 to 1936.

I am proud to be a United States Coast Guardsman.
I revere that long line of expert seamen who by their devotion to duty and sacrifice of self have made it possible for me to be a member of a service honored and respected, in peace and in war, throughout the world.
I never, by word or deed, will bring reproach upon the fair name of my service, nor permit others to do so unchallenged.
I will cheerfully and willingly obey all lawful orders.
I will always be on time to relieve, and shall endeavor to do more, rather than less, than my share.
I will always be at my station, alert and attending to my duties.
I shall, so far as I am able, bring to my seniors solutions, not problems.
I shall live joyously, but always with due regard for the rights and privileges of others.
I shall endeavor to be a model citizen in the community in which I live.
I shall sell life dearly to an enemy of my country, but give it freely to rescue those in peril.
With God's help, I shall endeavor to be one of His noblest Works...
A UNITED STATES COAST GUARDSMAN.

— Creed of the United States Coast Guardsman

=== "You have to go out, but you don't have to come back!" ===
This unofficial motto of the Coast Guard dates to an 1899 United States Lifesaving Service regulation, which states in part: "In attempting a rescue, ... he will not desist from his efforts until by actual trial, the impossibility of effecting a rescue is demonstrated. The statement of the keeper that he did not try to use the boat because the sea or surf was too heavy will not be accepted, unless attempts to launch it were actually made and failed."

=== Coast Guard ensign ===
Ensign of the United States Coast Guard

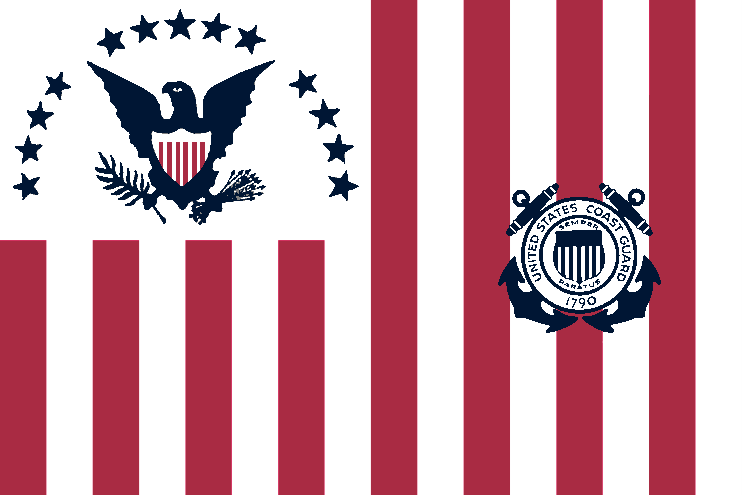
Former Coast Guard ensign, used from 1915 to 1953

The Coast Guard ensign (flag) was first flown by the Revenue Cutter Service in 1799 to distinguish revenue cutters from merchant ships. A 1 August 1799 order issued by Secretary of the Treasury Oliver Wolcott Jr. specified that the Ensign would be "sixteen perpendicular stripes (for the number of states in the United States at the time), alternate red and white, the union of the ensign to be the arms of the United States in a dark blue on a white field."

This ensign became familiar in American waters and served as the sign of authority for the Revenue Cutter Service until the early 20th century. The ensign was originally intended to be flown only on revenue cutters and boats connected with the Customs Service but over the years it was found flying atop custom houses as well, and the practice became a requirement in 1874. On 7 June 1910, President William Howard Taft issued an executive order adding an emblem to (or "defacing") the ensign flown by the Revenue cutters to distinguish it from what is now called the Customs Ensign flown from the custom houses. The emblem was changed to the official seal of the Coast Guard in 1927.

The purpose of the ensign is to allow ship captains to easily recognize those vessels having legal authority to stop and board them. It is flown only as a symbol of law enforcement authority and is never carried as a parade standard.

=== Coast Guard standard ===
The Coast Guard standard is used in parades and carries the battle honors of the Coast Guard. It was derived from the jack of the Coast Guard ensign which was flown by revenue cutters. The emblem is a blue eagle from the coat of arms of the United States on a white field. Above the eagle are the words "United States Coast Guard" below the eagle is the motto, "Semper Paratus" and the inscription "1790."

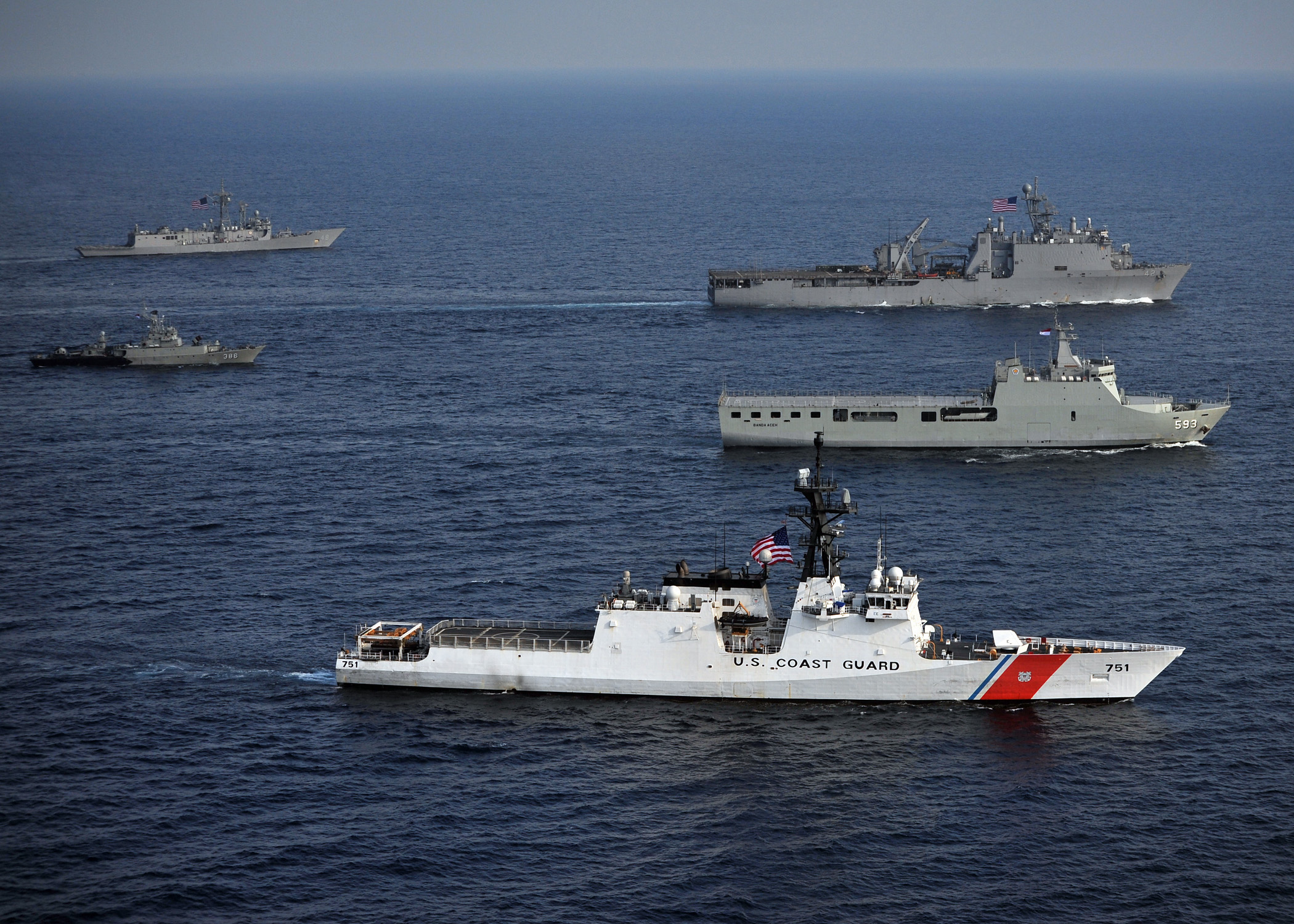
The Service Mark was developed to distinguish Coast Guard cutters from other government and commercial ships.

=== Service Mark ("Racing Stripe") ===
The Racing Stripe, officially known as the Service Mark, was designed in 1964 by the industrial design office of Raymond Loewy Associates to give the Coast Guard a distinctive, modern image. Loewy had designed the colors for the Air Force One fleet for Jackie Kennedy. President Kennedy was so impressed with his work, he suggested that the entire Federal Government needed his make-over and suggested that he start with the Coast Guard. The stripes are canted at a 64-degree angle, coincidentally the year the Racing Stripe was designed.

The racing stripe is borne by Coast Guard cutters, aircraft, and many boats. First used and placed into official usage as of 6 April 1967, it consists of a narrow blue stripe, a narrow white stripe between, and a broad CG red bar with the Coast Guard shield centered. Red-hulled icebreaker cutters and most HH-65/MH-65 helicopters (i.e., those with a red fuselage) bear a narrow blue stripe, a narrow empty stripe the color of the fuselage (an implied red stripe), and broad white bar, with the Coast Guard shield centered. Conversely, black-hulled cutters (such as buoy tenders and inland construction tenders) use the standard racing stripe. Auxiliary vessels maintained by the Coast Guard also carry the Racing Stripe, but in inverted colors (i.e., broad blue stripe with narrow white and CG red stripes) and the Auxiliary shield. Similar racing stripe designs have been adopted for the use of other coast guards and maritime authorities and many other law enforcement and rescue agencies. (Note: For example, the National Park Service operates various vessels with a green racing stripe, as seen at Channel Islands National Park#Vessels (image) or at Sleeping Bear Dunes (image). Other agencies include the Virginia Beach Police Department Marine Patrol, the China Coast Guard, the Turkish Coast Guard, Baltimore Police Marine Unit, and the US Park Police.)

== Uniforms ==
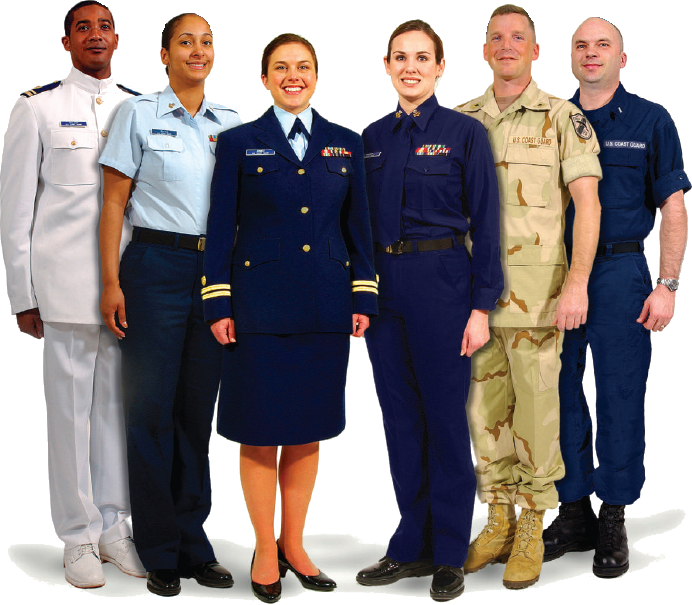
Photo showing a variety of Coast Guard uniforms. From Left: Service Dress White, Tropical Blue, Service Dress Blue, Winter Dress Blue, Camouflage Utility Uniform, Operational Dress Uniform

For most of the Coast Guard's history, its uniforms largely mirrored the style of U.S. Navy uniforms, distinguishable only by their insignia. In 1974, under the leadership of Admiral Chester R. Bender, the initial versions of the current Coast Guard Service Dress Blue and Tropical uniforms were introduced. This represented a major departure from many common conventions in naval and maritime uniforms. Notably, "Bender's Blues" was a common service dress uniform for all ranks, dispensing with the sailor suit and sailor cap formerly worn by enlisted members. Rank insignia remained consistent with the naval pattern and some distinctly-nautical items such as the pea coat, officer's sword, and dress white uniforms remained.

Today, the Coast Guard's uniforms remain among the simplest of any branch of the armed forces, with fewer total uniforms and uniform variants than the other armed services. There are only three uniforms that typically serve as standard uniforms of the day—the Operational Dress Uniform, Tropical Blue, and Service Dress Blue (Bravo).

== Coast Guard Reserve ==
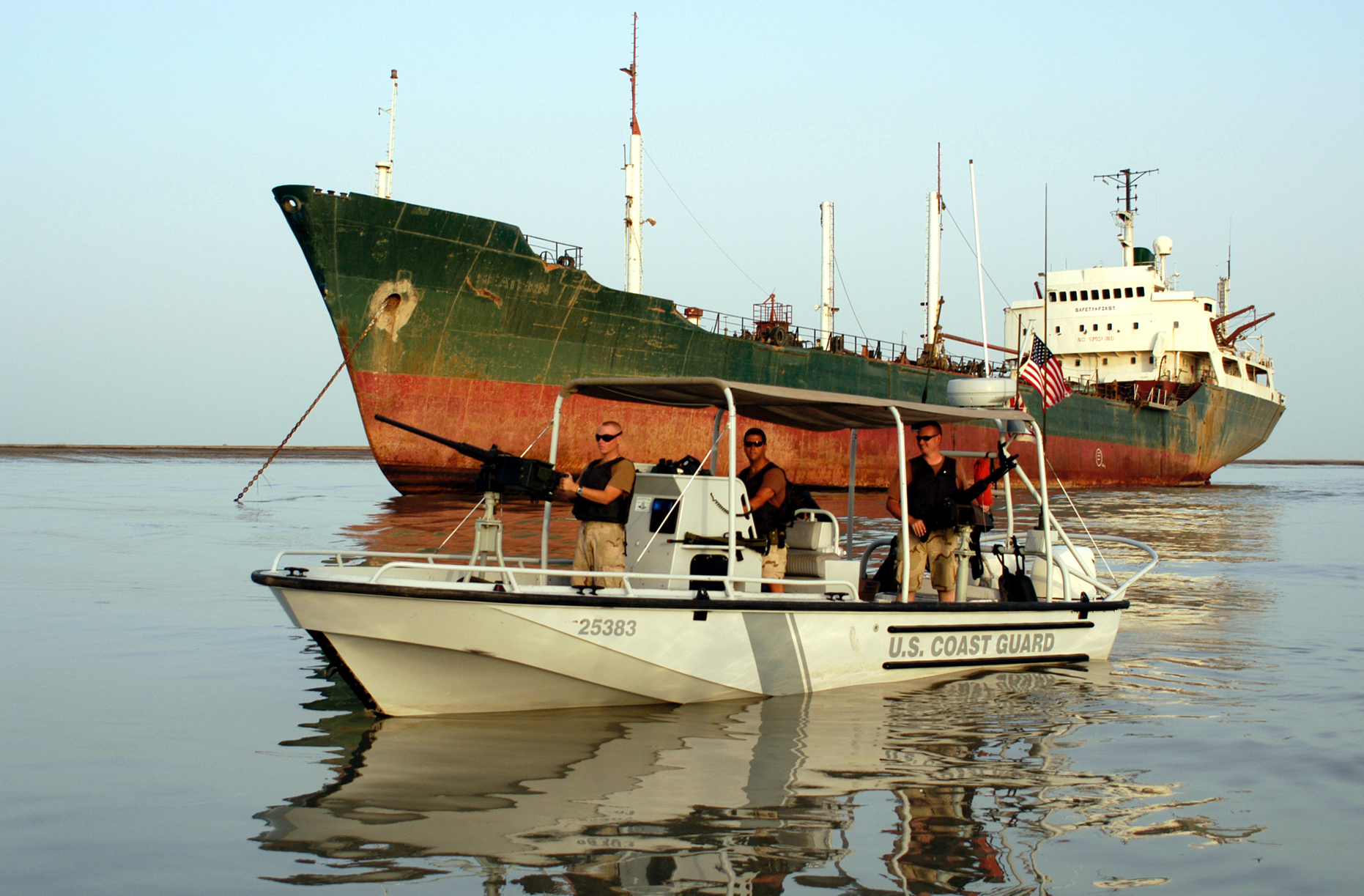
A USCG Port Security Unit boat patrolling in Umm Qasr, Iraq in 2003

The United States Coast Guard Reserve is the reserve military force of the Coast Guard. The Coast Guard Reserve was founded on 19 February 1941. The Coast Guard has 8700 reservists who normally drill two days a month and an additional 12 days of active duty each year, although many perform additional drill and active duty periods, to include those mobilized to extended active duty. Coast Guard reservists possess the same training and qualifications as their active duty counterparts, and as such, can be found augmenting active duty Coast Guard units every day.

During the Vietnam War and shortly thereafter, the Coast Guard considered abandoning the reserve program, but the force was instead reoriented into force augmentation, where its principal focus was not just reserve operations, but to add to the readiness and mission execution of every-day active duty personnel.

Since 11 September 2001, reservists have been activated and served on tours of active duty, to include deployments to the Persian Gulf and also as parts of Department of Defense combatant commands such as the U.S. Northern and Central Commands. Coast Guard Port Security Units are entirely staffed with reservists, except for five to seven active duty personnel. Additionally, most of the staffing the Coast Guard provides to the Navy Expeditionary Combat Command are reservists.

The Reserve is managed by the Assistant Commandant for Reserve, Rear Admiral James M. Kelly, USCG.

== Women in the Coast Guard ==
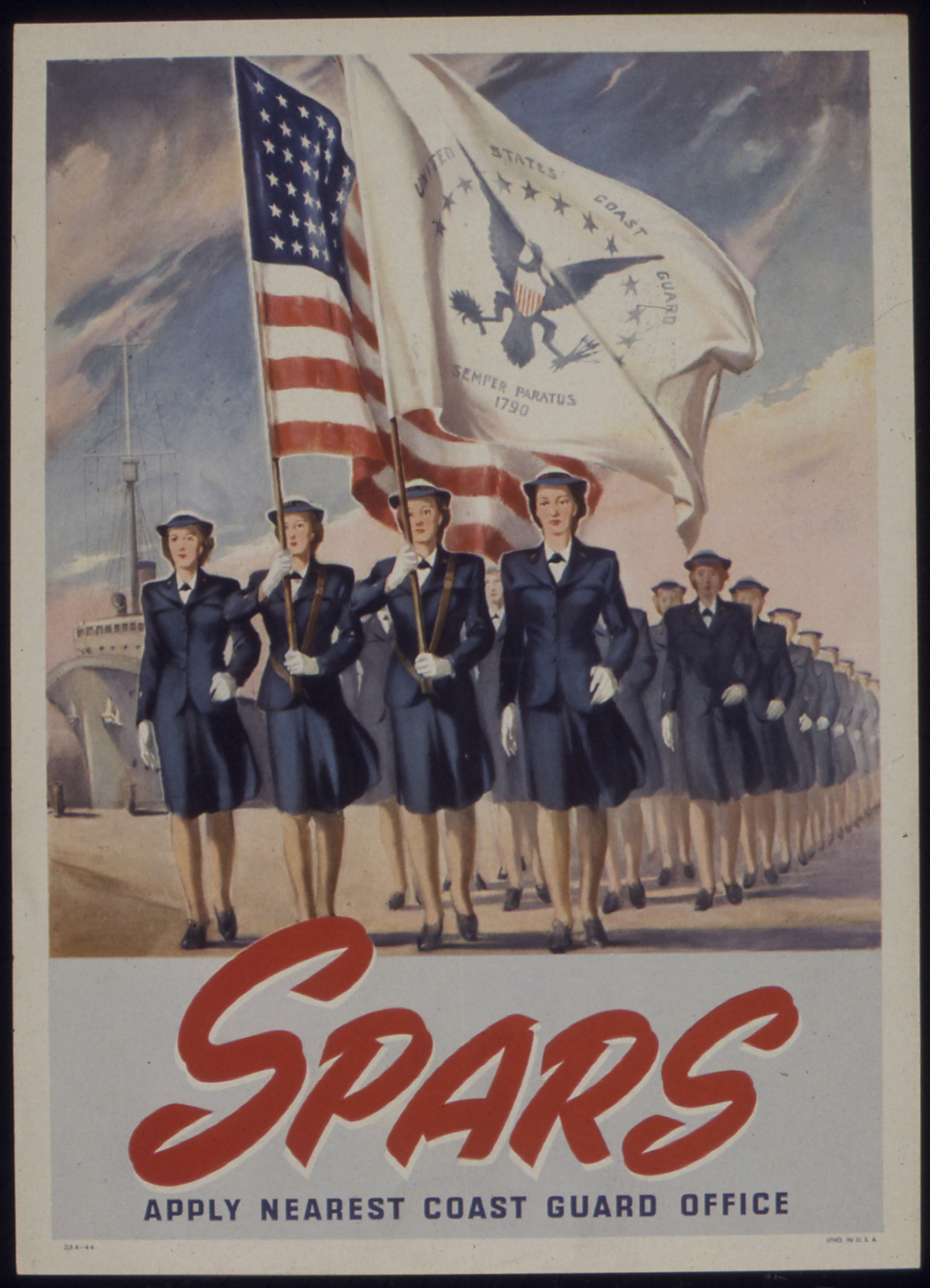
SPARS recruiting poster during World War II

There have been women in the United States Coast Guard since 1918, and women continue to serve in it today.

During World War I, in January 1918, radio and telegraph operator Myrtle Hazard enlisted as an electrician. She was the only woman to serve during the war and she is the namesake of USCGC Myrtle Hazard . While some newspapers reported that twin sisters Genevieve and Lucille Baker were the first women to serve in the Coast Guard, their attempt to enlist was rejected.

== Coast Guard Auxiliary ==
Badge of the United States Coast Guard Auxiliary

The United States Coast Guard Auxiliary is the uniformed, civilian volunteer component of the United States Coast Guard, created on 23 June 1939 by an act of Congress. Although it is a civilian organization, it was originally named the "United States Coast Guard Reserve" and was later re-named the "United States Coast Guard Auxiliary" on 19 February 1941 when a military reserve force for the Coast Guard was created. As part of "Team Coast Guard" (the term used to collectively describe all active, reserve, auxiliary, and civilian employees), the auxiliary carries out, or assists in, nearly all of the Coast Guard's noncombatant and non-law enforcement missions. Auxiliarists are subject to direction from the commandant of the Coast Guard. As of 2022, there were approximately 26,000 members of the U.S. Coast Guard Auxiliary.

Coast Guard policy has assigned many of its duties related to recreational boating safety to the Auxiliary, including public boating safety education and outreach. This includes offering boating skills courses, liaising with marine-related businesses at the local level, and providing voluntary Vessel Safety Checks (formerly called Courtesy Examinations) to the public. Additionally, Auxiliarists use their own vessels, boats, and aircraft (once registered as Coast Guard facilities) to provide operational support to the Coast Guard by conducting safety patrols, assisting in search and rescue missions, inspecting aids to navigation, and performing other tasks on behalf of the Coast Guard.

Prior to 1997, Auxiliarists were largely limited to activities supporting recreational boating safety. In 1997, however, new legislation authorized the Auxiliary to participate in any and all Coast Guard missions except direct military and direct law enforcement. Auxiliarists may directly augment active duty Coast Guard personnel in non-combat, non-law enforcement roles (e.g. radio communications watch stander, interpreter, cook, etc.) and may assist active duty personnel in inspecting commercial vessels and maintaining aids-to-navigation. Auxiliarists may support the law enforcement and homeland security missions of the Coast Guard but may not directly participate (make arrests, etc.), and Auxiliarists are not permitted to carry a weapon while serving in any Auxiliary capacity.

== Medals and honors ==
One Coast Guardsman, Douglas Albert Munro, has earned the Medal of Honor, the highest military award of the United States. Fifty-five coast guardsmen have earned the Navy Cross and numerous men and women have earned the Distinguished Flying Cross.

The highest peacetime decoration awarded within the Coast Guard is the Homeland Security Distinguished Service Medal; prior to the transfer of the Coast Guard to the Department of Homeland Security, the highest peacetime decoration was the Department of Transportation Distinguished Service Medal. The highest unit award available is the Presidential Unit Citation.

In wartime, members of the Coast Guard are eligible to receive the Navy version of the Medal of Honor. A Coast Guard Medal of Honor is authorized but has not yet been developed or issued.

In May 2006, at the Change of Command ceremony when Admiral Thad Allen took over as Commandant, President George W. Bush awarded the entire Coast Guard, including the Coast Guard Auxiliary, the Coast Guard Presidential Unit Citation with hurricane device, for its efforts during and after Hurricane Katrina and Tropical Storm Rita.

== Notable Coast Guardsmen ==
Numerous celebrities have served in the Coast Guard including tennis player Jack Kramer, golfer Arnold Palmer, All Star baseball player Sid Gordon, boxer Jack Dempsey; surfer and inventor Tom Blake; musicians Kai Winding, Rudy Vallee, Derroll Adams, and Tom Waits; actors Buddy Ebsen, Sid Caesar, Victor Mature, Richard Cromwell, Alan Hale Jr., William Hopper, Beau Bridges, Jeff Bridges, Cesar Romero; author Alex Haley; and Senator Claiborne Pell.

Vice Admiral Thad Allen in 2005 was named Principal Federal Officer to oversee recovery efforts in the Gulf Region after Hurricane Katrina. After promotion to Admiral, on the eve of his retirement as Commandant, Allen again received national visibility after being named National Incident Commander overseeing the response efforts of the Deepwater Horizon oil spill.

Former Coast Guard officers have been appointed to numerous civilian government offices. After retiring as Commandant of the Coast Guard in 2002, Admiral James Loy went on to serve as United States deputy secretary of homeland security. After their respective Coast Guard careers, Carlton Skinner served as the first civilian governor of Guam; G. William Miller, 65th secretary of the treasury, and retired vice admiral Harvey E. Johnson Jr. served as Deputy Administrator and Chief Operating Officer of the Federal Emergency Management Agency (FEMA) under President George W. Bush. Rear Admiral Stephen W. Rochon was appointed by President George W. Bush to serve as the director of the executive residence and White House chief usher, beginning service on 12 March 2007, and continued to serve in the same capacity under President Barack Obama.

Two Coast Guard aviators, Commander Bruce E. Melnick and Captain Daniel C. Burbank, have served as NASA astronauts. Coast Guard Reserve commander Andre Douglas was selected in 2021 to join NASA Astronaut Group 23.

Signalman First Class Douglas Albert Munro was awarded the Medal of Honor posthumously, and is the only Coast Guardsman to ever receive this honor.

In July 2025, rescue swimmer AST2 Scott Ruskan participated in the rescue of 165 people in Kerr County, Texas (mainly at Camp Mystic) - the most in a single USCG response. In July 2026, he was awarded the Pat Tillman Award for Service.

== Associations ==
=== Coast Guard Aviation Association ===
Those who have piloted or flown in Coast Guard aircraft under official flight orders may join the Coast Guard Aviation Association which was formerly known as the "Ancient Order of the Pterodactyl" ("Flying Since the World was Flat"). The Ancient Albatross Award is presented to the active duty USCG member who qualified as an aviator earlier than any other person who is still serving. Separate enlisted and officer awards are given.

=== Coast Guard CW Operators Association ===
The Coast Guard CW Operators Association (CGCWOA) is a membership organization comprising primarily former members of the United States Coast Guard who held the enlisted rating of Radioman (RM) or Telecommunications Specialist (TC), and who employed International Morse Code (CW) in their routine communications duties on Coast Guard cutters and at shore stations.

=== USCG Chief Petty Officers Association ===
Members of this organization unite to assist members and dependents in need, assist with Coast Guard recruiting efforts, support the aims and goals of the Coast Guard Chief Petty Officers Academy, keep informed on Coast Guard matters, and assemble for social amenities; and include Chief, Senior Chief, and Master Chief Petty Officers, active, reserve and retired. Membership is also open to all Chief Warrant Officers and Officers who have served as a Chief Petty Officer.

=== USCG Chief Warrant and Warrant Officers Association (CWOA) ===
Established in 1929, the Chief Warrant and Warrant Officers Association, United States Coast Guard (CWOA) represents Coast Guard warrant and chief warrant officers (active, reserve and retired) to the Congress, White House and the Department of Homeland Security. Additionally, the association communicates with the Coast Guard leadership on matters of concern to Coast Guard chief warrant officers.

== In popular culture ==
The U.S. Coast Guard maintains a Motion Picture and Television Office (MOPIC) in Hollywood, California, along with its sister services at the Department of Defense dedicated to enhancing public awareness and understanding of the Coast Guard, its people, and its missions through a cooperative effort with the entertainment industry.

=== In film ===
- Don Winslow of the Coast Guard (1943), based on the Don Winslow of the Navy comic strip, depicts a Coast Guard intelligence officer hunting down Japanese spies on the west coast of the United States during WWII.
- Fighting Coast Guard (1951), depicts Coast Guard trained to help win WWII.
- The Boatniks (1970), a slapstick comedy depicting a clumsy Coast Guard ensign newly assigned as skipper of a cutter in the Newport Beach area.
- The Guardian (2006), depicts the Aviation Survival Technician (AST) program.
- Pain & Gain (2013), starring Dwayne Johnson and Mark Wahlberg, depicted the Coast Guard Deployable Specialized Forces in action.
- The Finest Hours (2016), A film portraying the rescue of the crew of SS Pendleton by coxswain Bernard C. Webber and the three other crewmen of Coast Guard Motor Lifeboat CG 36500.
- Deepwater Horizon (2016), depicts the events of 20 April 2010 when the mobile drilling platform Deepwater Horizon suffered a mass casualty explosion that resulted in the deaths of 11 crew members. The film also depicts the Coast Guard's coordination and response in the immediate aftermath of the explosion.

=== In novels ===
- Carl (2020-present), the title character of the popular Dungeon Crawler Carl series of novels by Matt Dinniman (a U.S. Army military brat), is a U.S. Coast Guard veteran.

=== On television ===
The Coast Guard has been featured in several television series, including:

- Coast Guard Alaska: Search and Rescue, a series on The Weather Channel that features a Coast Guard search-and-rescue unit based in Kodiak, Alaska. Several series have spun off the original to focus on units based in Cape Disappointment and Florida.

== Relationship to the Navy ==
Although the Posse Comitatus Act prevents federal military personnel from acting in a law enforcement capacity, the Coast Guard is exempt from the law and fulfills a law enforcement role in naval operations. It provides Law Enforcement Detachments (LEDETs) to Navy vessels, where they perform arrests and other law enforcement duties during Navy boarding and interdiction missions. In times of war, or when directed by the president, the Coast Guard operates as a service in the Navy and is subject to the orders of the secretary of the Navy until it is transferred back to the Department of Homeland Security. At other times, Coast Guard Port Security Units are sent overseas to guard the security of ports and other assets. The Coast Guard also jointly staffs the Navy's Naval Coastal Warfare Groups and Squadrons (the latter of which were known as Harbor Defense Commands until late-2004), which oversee defense efforts in foreign littoral combat and inshore areas. Additionally, Coast Guard and Navy vessels sometimes operate together in search and rescue operations.

== See also ==
=== U.S. Coast Guard ===
- AMVER
- Badges of the United States Coast Guard
- Chaplain of the United States Coast Guard
- Coast Guard Day
- Coast Guard Intelligence
- Code of Federal Regulations, Title 33
- Joint Maritime Training Center
- List of United States Coast Guard cutters
- List of United States Coast Guard stations
- Maritime Law Enforcement Academy
- Maritime Security Risk Analysis Model
- MARSEC
- National Data Buoy Center
- Naval militias in the United States
- North Pacific Coast Guard Agencies Forum
- Patrol Forces Southwest Asia
- SPARS
- United States Coast Guard Legal Division
- United States Coast Guard Police
- United States Coast Guard Research & Development Center
- U.S. National Ice Center

=== Related agencies ===
- List of United States federal law enforcement agencies
- National Oceanic and Atmospheric Administration Fisheries Office of Law Enforcement
- U.S. Immigration and Customs Enforcement (ICE)
- United States Maritime Service
- United States Merchant Marine
