= USCGC Tahoma =

The following ships of the United States Coast Guard have borne the name USCGC Tahoma,

- USCGC Tahoma (WPG-80), a United States Coast Guard cutter that operated during World War II. Sold for scrap in 1955.
- USCGC Tahoma (WMEC-908), a medium endurance cutter which entered service in 1988
