= USCGC Forward =

American Coast Guard cutter

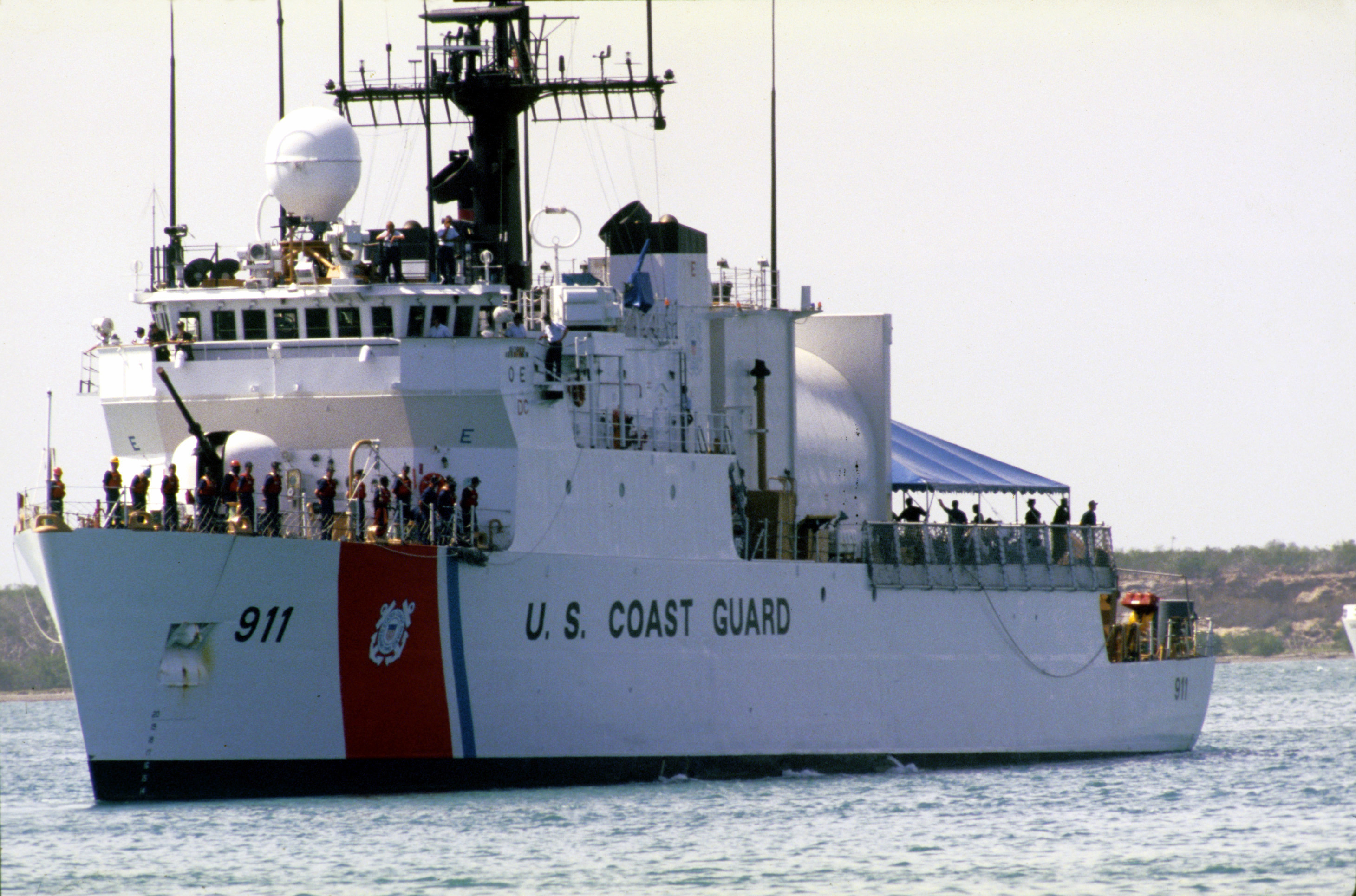
- USCGC Forward (WMEC-911) in 1992.

History

United States
- Name: USCGC Forward
- Namesake: Walter Forward
- Builder: Derecktor Shipyards, Middletown, Rhode Island
- Acquired: 4 August 1990
- Commissioned: 1990
- Home port: Portsmouth, Virginia
- Identification: MMSI number: 367261000; Callsign: NICB
- Motto: Ever the Sentinel
- Status: In active service
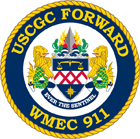
- Badge

General characteristics
- Class & type: Famous-class cutter
- Displacement: 1,800 long tons (1,829 t)
- Length: 270 ft (82 m)
- Beam: 38 ft (12 m)
- Draft: 14.5 ft (4.4 m)
- Propulsion: Twin turbo-charged ALCO V-18 diesel engines
- Speed: 19.5 knots (36.1 km/h; 22.4 mph)
- Range: 9,900 miles
- Boats & landing craft carried: 1 × Over-the-Horizon (OTH) Interceptor; 1 × RHI with twin 90 HP outboard engines
- Complement: 100 personnel (14 officers, 86 enlisted)
- Sensors & processing systems: MK 92 Fire Control Radar; SPS-73 Surface Search Radar
- Electronic warfare & decoys: AN/SLQ-32
- Armament: 1 OTO Melara Mk 75 76 mm/62 caliber naval gun; 2 × .50 caliber (12.7 mm) machine gun
- Aircraft carried: HH-65 Dolphin; HH-60 Jayhawk; MH-68 Stingray

USCGC Forward (WMEC-911) is a United States Coast Guard medium endurance cutter. She is the fourth cutter of that name; two were United States Revenue Cutter Service vessels and two, including the contemporary cutter, Coast Guard vessels. All were named for Walter Forward, fifteenth United States Secretary of the Treasury. The present Forward was constructed by Derecktor Shipyards in Middletown, Rhode Island, was delivered in May 1989, and commissioned 4 August 1990. USCGC Forward (WMEC-911) and USCGC Legare (WMEC-912) were commissioned in a joint ceremony in Portsmouth, Virginia.

== History ==
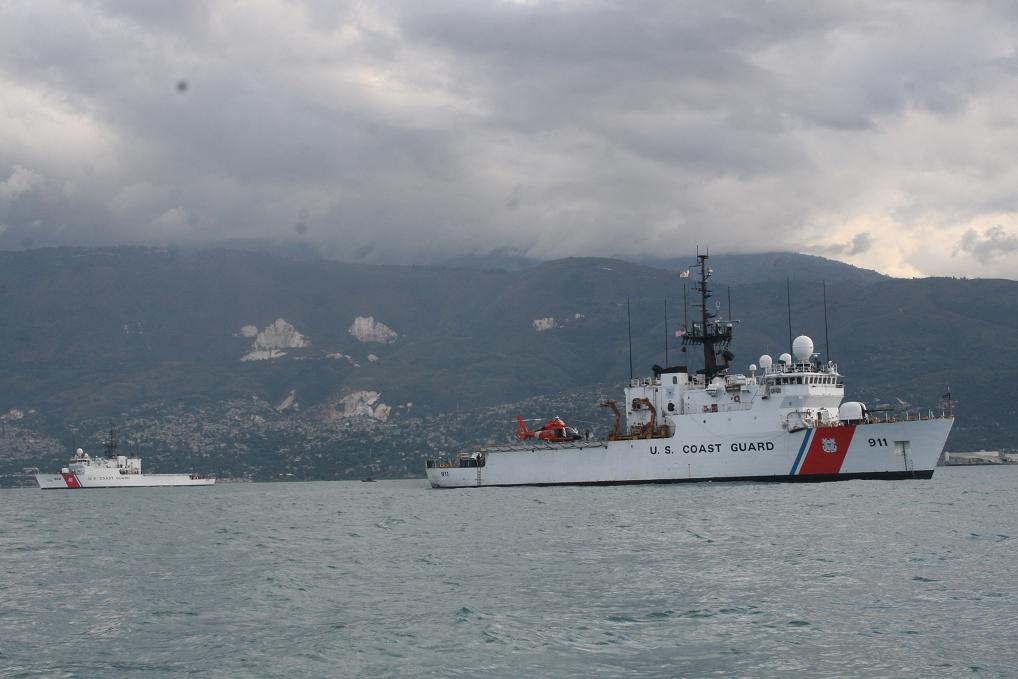
USCGC Forward at Port-au-Prince, Haiti in January 2010.

=== 2010s ===
On 12 January 2010, USCGC Forward was at Guantanamo Bay Naval Base when the 2010 Haiti earthquake occurred. She was ordered to assist in the humanitarian relief efforts, and was the first American vessel to arrive in Port-au-Prince the following morning.

USCGC Forward was set to wrap a deployment in the Caribbean and was ported in Guantanamo Bay in order to onload fuel, supplies, and debrief the USCGC Tahoma prior to returning to home port. The Tahoma was set to take over operations in the area and the Forward was set to return home. In lieu of returning home, the Forward and her crew set sail to Haiti to initialize the U.S. response to the massive efforts that would eventually take place in the following weeks.

=== Awards ===
Forward has been awarded the following unit and campaign awards:

- Coast Guard Presidential Unit Citation (Hurricane device)
- Joint Meritorious Unit Award (Second)
- Department of Homeland Security Outstanding Unit Award
- Secretary of Transportation Outstanding Unit Award
- Coast Guard Unit Commendation
- Coast Guard Meritorious Unit Commendation (Second)(Operational Distinguishing Device)
- Navy Meritorious Unit Commendation
- Meritorious Team Commendation
- Coast Guard "E" Ribbon(Fourth)
- Coast Guard Bicentennial Unit Commendation
- National Defense Service Medal (Second)
- Armed Forces Expeditionary Medal
- Global War on Terrorism Service Medal
- Humanitarian Service Medal (Fourth)
- Transportation 9-11 Ribbon
- Special Operations Service Ribbon
