= 619 (disambiguation) =

619 is a year.

619 may also refer to:

- 619 (number)
- Area code 619 in San Diego, California, United States
- Tiger feint kick or 619, a wrestling move used by Rey Mysterio
- USCGC Confidence (WMEC-619), a United States Coast Guard cutter
- Juneteenth (6/19)
- Experiment 619, the codename for Splodyhead, a fictional alien character from Disney's Lilo & Stitch franchise
