= USCGC Seneca =

USCGC Seneca may refer to one of the following United States Coast Guard cutters:

- USCGC Seneca (1908), launched 1908; decommissioned 1936; scrapped 1950
- USCGC Seneca (WMEC-906), launched 1984, commissioned 1987; in active service as of 2008
