= Venturous =

Venturous may refer to:

- HMS Venturous (D87), a British Royal Navy destroyer launched in 1917 which served during World War I and was sold in 1936 for scrapping
- USCGC Venturous (WMEC-625), a United States Coast Guard cutter commissioned in 1968
