= USCGC Durable =

US Coast Guard vessel

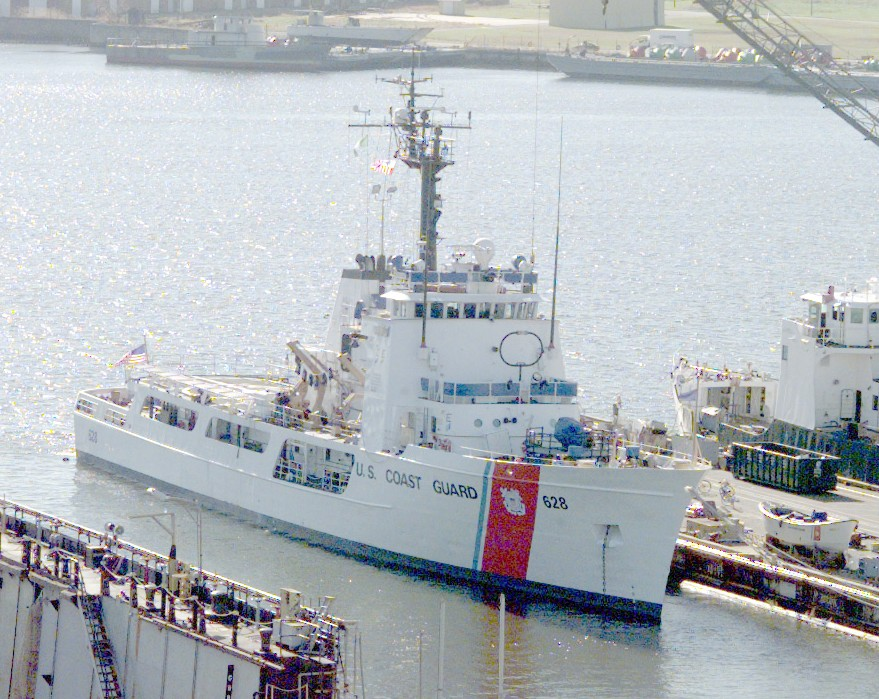
- USCGC Durable (WMEC-628)

History

United States
- Builder: Coast Guard Yard, Curtis Bay, Maryland
- Laid down: 1 July 1966
- Launched: 29 April 1967
- Commissioned: 8 December 1968
- Decommissioned: 20 September 2001
- Honors and awards: Coast Guard Meritorious Unit Commendation
- Fate: Transferred to Colombia, 2003.
- Status: In service with the Colombian Navy.

General characteristics
- Displacement: 759 tons
- Length: 210 ft 6 in (64.16 m)
- Beam: 34 ft (10 m)
- Draught: 10 ft 6 in (3.20 m) max
- Propulsion: 2 × V16 2550 horsepower ALCO diesel engines
- Speed: max 18 knots; 2,700 mi (4,300 km) range
- Range: cruise 14 knots; 6,100 mi (9,800 km) range
- Complement: 12 officers, 63 enlisted
- Sensors & processing systems: 2 × AN/SPS-64
- Armament: 1 × Mk 38 25mm machine gun; 2 × M2HB .50 caliber machine gun
- Aircraft carried: HH-65 Dolphin

USCGC Durable (WMEC-628) was a United States Coast Guard medium endurance cutter. The Durable was the first cutter in Coast Guard history to hold this name. Like all ships in the Reliance-Class of 210-foot (64 m) medium endurance cutters, Durable was named for an aspirational trait meaning to be capable of withstanding wear or decay.

The Coast Guard Yard laid Durable's keel on 1 July 1966. Mrs. Alton A. Lennon, the wife of Congressman Alton A. Lennon of North Carolina, sponsored the new cutter at Durable's christening and launching on 29 April 1967. The Coast Guard commissioned Durable on 8 December 1968 at Coast Guard Base Galveston, under the command of Commander Richard M. Thomas. She was initially home-ported at Galveston, Texas. The following year, in June, 1969, she transferred to Brownsville, Texas, where she operated from until 1986. On her first day of duty at Brownsville, Durable assisted the grounded fishing vessel Dahlia 125 miles (201 km) south of Galveston. On 25 June 1969 Commander Paul E. Schroeder took command of the cutter. In February and March 1970 she monitored the situation following a fire on an oil rig off the entrance to the Mississippi River. She sailed to the assistance of the shrimp trawler Mr. Tucker in December 1970 after the trawler had been hijacked from the port of Freeport, Texas. The trawler's crew killed the two hijackers and then requested assistance. The Durable towed her back into port.

== 1970s ==
In March 1972, under the command of Commander William Drew, she acted as the on-scene commander for the multi-unit search for survivors of the T/V San Nicholas which had broken in half and sank on 5 March. A passing merchant ship managed to save two survivors of San Nicholas, but all the cutter found was debris. During this operation, a Coast Guard HH-52A helicopter made the 1,000th successful landing on Durable's flight deck. On 15 March, while still acting as the on-scene commander, she responded to a medical emergency on board the M/V Constellation. In October 1973 Durable, now under the command of Commander William J. Brogdon, Jr., responded to a distress call from the F/V Tiki 7, which was disabled and in danger of sinking. The cutter arrived to find the vessel nearly submerged. She rescued her seven crewmen and marked the vessel as a hazard to navigation.

In 1975 Durable accomplished one of the longest tows on record. The tug Beaver became disabled while towing two decommissioned U.S. Navy destroyers to a scrap yard. With a tropical storm approaching the three vessels, Durable was sent to the rescue. Arriving on scene, the cutter made up a 3,500-foot (1,100 m) towline and fought 50-knot (93 km/h) winds and 12-foot (3.7 m) seas while towing all three vessels to safety.

During the first six months of 1978, Durable saved six lives and one vessel while assisting 26 other people. Although search and rescue was always one of the Coast Guard's primary missions, during the mid-1970s and on the Coast Guard's efforts to interdict narcotics smuggling by sea became a focus of the Coast Guard and Durable's history reflects that shift. During this same six-month period, she gained international attention for her law enforcement activities that overshadowed this successful search and rescue work.

On 6 December 1977 she seized the M/V Lemarca I after a boarding party discovered 55,060 pounds of marijuana on board and arrested her 9-man crew. On 4 May 1978 she seized the F/V Pappy with 31,772 pounds of marijuana on board and arrested her 5-man crew. On 3 June 1978, with a television news crew aboard who were filming the cutter's enforcement of fisheries laws, she seized the F/V Adeline Marie after discovering 49,400 pounds of marijuana on board. Her three-man crew was taken into custody and the television crew captured the entire event on camera and Durable and her crew were soon on the evening news.

The following month Durable, now under the command of Commander Gary F. Crosby, set a personal record of seizures that again made the local media. On 5 July 1978 she seized the Bonos Margie after discovering 26,912 pounds of marijuana on board and arrested her six-man crew. Later that month, on 12 July, she seized a 63-foot (19 m) dive boat 200 miles (320 km) southwest of Key West, Florida, after her helicopter located the suspect craft and a boarding team discovered 1,000 bales of marijuana in the dive boat's hold. After taking the vessel's occupants into custody and placing a prize crew aboard, the cutter got underway, escorting the vessel, bound for St. Petersburg.

En route, she came across the sport fisherman Miss Renee, boarded her and discovered over 17,000 pounds of marijuana. She seized that vessel and began escorting both back to Florida. Later that day she came across the 65-foot (20 m) F/V Joanne, located 20,148 pounds of marijuana on board, and seized her. Fifty-five miles south-southwest of St. Petersburg she located the 40-foot (12 m) yawl Carte Blance, boarded her, and discovered 15,396 pounds of marijuana. The Durable seized her as well and escorted all four of the arrested vessels to St. Petersburg. During her patrol, she conducted 37 helicopter landings, bringing her total since commissioning to 2,806.

After returning to the Gulf of Mexico, she seized the 111-foot (34 m) coastal freighter Superfly II on 16 August 1978 when a boarding party located over 32½ tons of "high-grade Colombian" marijuana on board. Her 16-man crew was taken into custody and a prize crew was placed on board. The cutter then escorted her prize back to Brownsville, arriving there on 19 August 1978. For the period of 6 December 1977 through 31 August 1978, she seized nine vessels and 311,000 pounds of marijuana. In recognition of her outstanding performance in both search and rescue and law enforcement activities during the period from December 1977 through August 1978, the commander of the Atlantic Area, VADM R. T. Price, awarded the cutter and crew the Coast Guard Meritorious Unit Commendation.

From December 1978 to August 1979, she inspected the entire fleet of Japanese tuna long-line fishing vessels that sailed in the Gulf of Mexico. She issued citations and notices of violations. She also continued her narcotics seizures. On 22 April 1979 she seized the F/V Cap'n Stud after discovering 15,000 pounds of marijuana, however, the vessel and cargo were destroyed while hard aground on a reef.

Commander Kent H. Williams took over command of the cutter in June 1979. On 12 July 1979 she seized the F/V Morning Star, which was attempting to smuggle 25,000 pounds of marijuana. Also in July, Durable responded to a distress call from the M/V Maritime Hawk which reported having a fire in her engine room. The cutter arrived within two hours and assisted the Maritime Hawk's crew in successfully fighting the fire.

== 1980s ==
On 4 December 1980 Durable suffered a major fire in her engine room. On 7 November 1980 she seized the F/V Liebre which was carrying 20,000 pounds of marijuana. A year later, on 18 November 1981 Durable seized the F/V Miss Karline which was attempting to smuggle 13,600 pounds of marijuana and arrested her crew of 11. On 10 January 1982 Durable seized the F/V Windjammer, which had 16,000 pounds of marijuana on board. All six of her crew were arrested. On 15 January 1982 she seized the Carolina / Mary Ann I, which had a record 47,000 pounds of marijuana on board. Her six-man crew was also taken into custody. The following year, on 25 September 1982, she seized two U.S. fishing vessels, the Don Manuel and the Brownskin Gal, off the Yucatán Peninsula carrying 13 tons of marijuana. All 11 crewmen were arrested.

On 13 May 1983 she seized Afcog VI / Blanquita carrying 30,000 pounds of marijuana. Later that year, on 13 September, she seized the F/V Macabi, which was carrying 22,750 pounds of marijuana. On 5 February 1984 she seized the 70-foot (21 m) vessel Lady Mar in the Yucatán Channel after a 20-hour chase in which Lady Mar rammed Durable twice in an attempt to prevent a boarding. The Durable sustained minor hull damage but managed to seize the vessel. Her boarding team discovered over 43,000 pounds of marijuana. Again in the Yucatán Channel, on 27 March 1984, she seized the F/V Lady Linda attempting to smuggle 30,960 pounds of marijuana.

In May 1985 she seized two fishing vessels for narcotics violations. On 5 May she seized the F/V Miss Ruth, which was carrying 25,560 pounds of marijuana and four days later, on 9 May, she seized the F/V Fenix which was carrying 24,960 pounds of marijuana. The latter, a Colombian-flagged vessel, was boarded after permission was obtained from the Colombian government. Both crews, totaling 17 men, were arrested and the vessels were escorted to Key West. On 5 November 1985 she seized the Mexican F/V Don Jose which was carrying 24,000 pounds of marijuana. The vessel was found abandoned and sinking while at anchor -- Durable's crew managed to "interdict" the illicit cargo before she sank. On 12 March 1986 she attempted to stop and board the Mexican F/V Fermin II, but her crew scuttled the fishing vessel. Five persons on board were rescued and then arrested and evidence was obtained. Both the evidence and the five persons on board were turned over to the Mexican Navy.

On 4 May 1986 Durable seized the F/V San Juan, which had 19,760 pounds of marijuana on board, and arrested her crew of 7. On 16 May 1986 a boarding party discovered approximately 200 tons of marijuana aboard the sailing vessel West Wind. The West Wind was seized and her crew of three were taken into custody. On 14 July 1986 she seized the Colombian-flagged F/V Oniris on behalf of the Colombian government and arrested her crew of 7. On 18 July 1986 a boarding team found marijuana residue on board the M/V Halley. They then seized the vessel and arrested her crew of 6.

The Durable was then prepared to undergo a $28 million refit known as a "Major Maintenance Availability." She was decommissioned in the fall of 1986 after steaming to Colonna's Shipyard in Norfolk, Virginia. The refit included improving habitability, improving stability by rearranging tank locations, replacement of all asbestos paneling, increasing the berthing space, upgrading the flight deck and helicopter equipment, increasing the amount of helicopter fuel carried, improving the evaporator, increasing and upgrading the communications and electronics systems, and adding a new smoke detection system and fire-fighting equipment. The most obvious change, however, was the removal of her problematic stern exhaust system and its replacement with traditional vertical exhaust stacks.

The overhaul was completed by 30 January 1989 and Durable returned to active service on 25 May 1989 under the command of Commander Anthony S. Tangeman. She was home-ported in St. Petersburg, Florida, for the remainder of her Coast Guard career. Durable, along with all units based in D7 and D8, were frequently called upon to intercept illegal migrants attempting sea passage to the U.S. from islands in the Caribbean, in particular Cuba and Haiti.

== 1990s ==
After a military coup occurred in Haiti on 30 September 1991, 15 U.S. and two French missionaries left the island nation on 8 October aboard three sailboats, bound for Guantanamo Bay. After receiving a request for assistance through the U.S. Embassy in Paris, France, the Coast Guard sent a HU-25 Falcon to locate the three vessels, which were found 60 miles (97 km) south of Guantanamo Bay. The jet then vectored Durable, then at Guantanamo Bay on a mid-patrol break, to the scene. Once she arrived, the cutter established communications with each of the three sailboats. The missionaries passed the word that many of them were seasick and suffering from exhaustion. Those so afflicted were transferred to the cutter and two-men crews from Durable were placed aboard each of the sailboats to assist the remaining passengers in sailing the vessels. Early the next morning two of the three boats developed mechanical problems. The cutter took one under tow while Durable's engineers repaired the other. She then set a course back to Guantanamo Bay, towing one sailboat and escorting the other two.

In May 1992 Durable, along with Nantucket (WPB-1316), participated in Operation Tradewinds '92, a joint exercise involving U.S. forces and units of the Lesser Antilles Regional Security System (RSS). The Coast Guardsmen trained local coast guard forces in search and rescue techniques, damage control, navigation, gunnery operations, and maritime law enforcement tactics. The Durable, under the command of Commander R. W. Batson, made ports of call in Barbados, Bahamas, Jamaica, Grenada, St. Vincent, Trinidad, St. Lucia, St. Kitts, Antigua, and Dominica. In a sign of things to come, she intercepted a number of Haitian vessels attempting to make it to U.S. soil and turned them back to Haiti while those on vessels found to be unseaworthy were taken aboard and dropped off at Guantanamo Bay.

In 1992 and 1993, increasingly large numbers of Haitians set sail for the U.S. in a wide variety of craft. The Coast Guard, under the operational rubrick "Able Manner," attempted to halt that flow of desperate humanity. The Durable, on a fisheries enforcement patrol in the Gulf of Mexico, was ordered to the waters off the north coast of Haiti.

In May 1995 Durable intercepted 13 Cubans migrants and took them aboard. Under a policy established by President William J. Clinton whereby any Cuban migrants picked up at sea would be returned to Cuba, Durable sailed to the Cuban port of Cabañas. She arrived there on 9 May 1995, becoming the first vessel of the U.S. government to dock in a port under the control of the Cuban government in some years.

On 2 January 1996 Durable rescued 195 Haitians who were on board a grossly overloaded 50-foot (15 m) sailboat when she was intercepted northwest of Haiti. The Haitians were returned to Port-au-Prince. On 8 September 1996 she seized the M/V Solution after a boarding party discovered approximately 14 kilos of cocaine on board. On 21 February 1997 Durable, under the command of Commander Stephen J. Krupa, returned to St. Petersburg after a 49-day patrol that covered over 9,000 miles (14,000 km) through the Caribbean. During that patrol the cutter conducted three search and rescue missions and took custody of the 173-foot (53 m) Honduran freighter Gold Star after the Coast Guard Law Enforcement Team 8H assigned to the USS Clark discovered 1,000 pounds of cocaine aboard the vessel. The USCGC Confidence first took custody of the seized freighter and began towing her to Florida. The Durable rendezvoused with Confidence, put an eight-man custody crew aboard the M/V Gold Star, took the vessel under tow and sailed to Key West.

On 23 March 1997 Durable seized a 32-foot (9.8 m) speedboat carrying 1,600 pounds of cocaine while the cutter was on a 41-day patrol of the Caribbean. A Coast Guard HC-130 spotted the boat near Haiti and directed Durable to the intercept. The speedboat managed to ground on a beach and its crew escaped inland, but the cutter seized the craft and its illicit cargo.

Later that year Durable, under the command of Commander J. P. Benvenuto, conducted a 51-day, 9,000-mile (14,000 km) patrol, returning to St. Petersburg on 27 September 1997. During the patrol Durable participated in operation "Caribe Venture," a cooperative law enforcement operation in the eastern Caribbean. The operation involved forces from the U.S., Great Britain, Antigua, Bermuda, St. Lucia, St. Vincent, Dominica, St. Maarten, Barbados, Grenada, and the Netherlands. In December 1997, during a 50-day patrol of the Caribbean, Durable recovered eight bales of marijuana that were dumped overboard from a "go-fast" boat that the cutter had been chasing. The boat managed to evade capture.

Due to the "increasing age of the deepwater fleet after 30 years of service, and due to mounting, costly maintenance requirements," the Durable was scheduled for decommissioning. The Coast Guard decommissioned the venerable cutter on 20 September 2001. In 2003 she was transferred to the government of Colombia and was renamed ARC Valle del Cauca.

== Colombian service ==
Commissioned into Colombian service in 2003, Valle del Cauca had her navigational, fueling, and aviation systems upgraded. She is assigned to the Colombian Navy's Pacific force, homeported at Bahía Málaga.
