= USCGC Legare (WMEC-912) =

United States Coast Guard endurance cutter

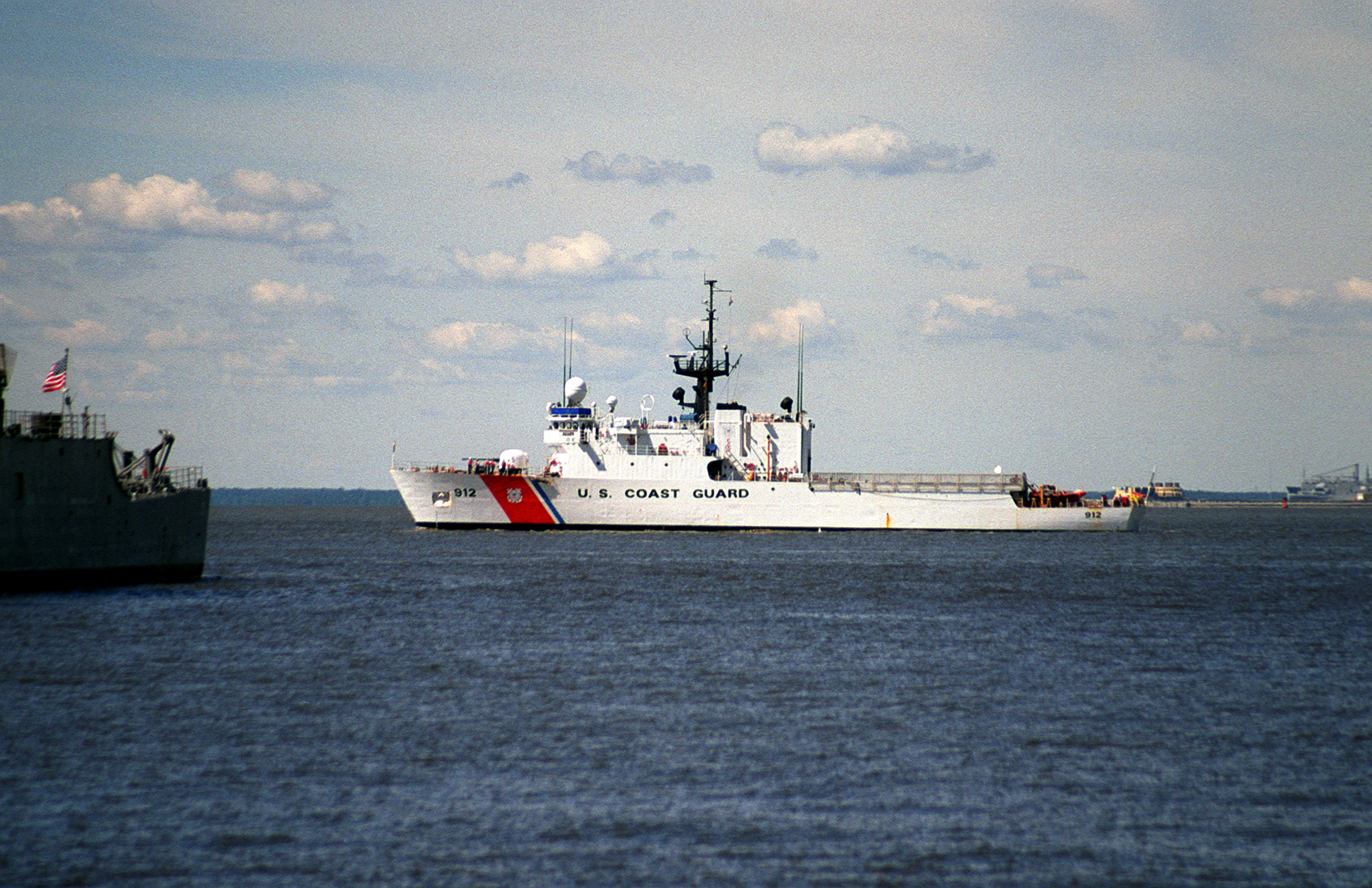
- USCGC Legare (WMEC-912)

History

United States
- Name: Legare
- Namesake: Hugh Swinton Legare
- Builder: Derecktor Shipyards, Middletown, Rhode Island
- Laid down: July 11, 1986
- Acquired: December 1, 1989
- Commissioned: August 4, 1990
- Home port: Newport, Rhode Island
- Identification: MMSI number: 367287000; Callsign: NRPM
- Motto: Facta Non Verba; Deeds not words
- Status: In active service

General characteristics
- Class & type: Famous-class cutter
- Displacement: 1,800 tons
- Length: 270 ft (82 m)
- Beam: 38 ft (12 m)
- Draught: 14.5 ft (4.4 m)
- Propulsion: Twin turbo-charged ALCO V-18 diesel engines
- Speed: 19.5 knots (36.1 km/h; 22.4 mph)
- Range: 9,900 miles
- Complement: 100 personnel (14 officers, 86 enlisted)
- Electronic warfare & decoys: AN/SLQ-32 (receive only)
- Armament: 1 OTO Melara Mk 75 76 mm/62 caliber naval gun; 2 × .50 caliber (12.7 mm) machine gun
- Aircraft carried: HH-65 Dolphin; HH-60 Jayhawk; MH-68 Stingray

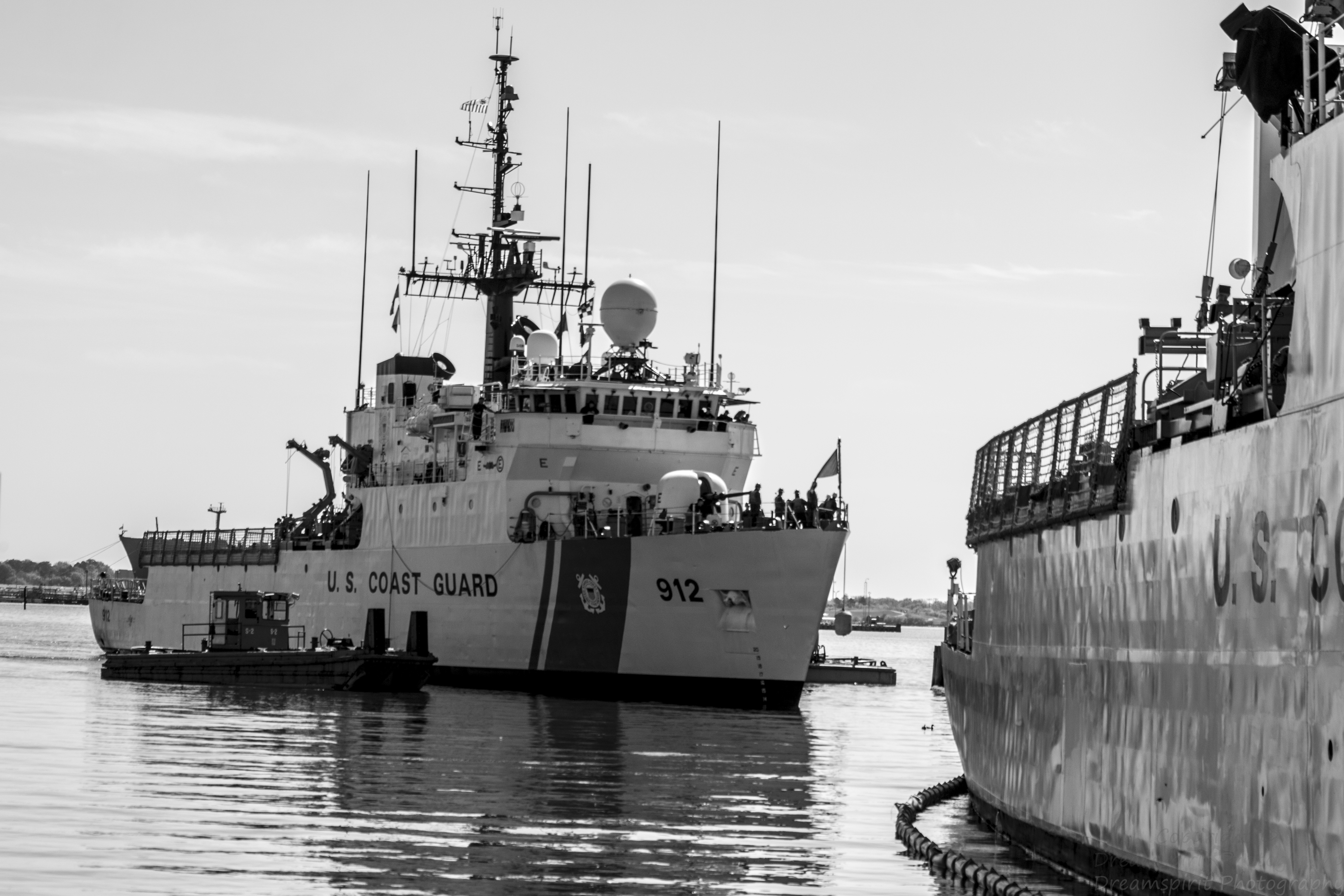
USCGC Legare returning to her former home port of Portsmouth, Virginia after a patrol

USCGC Legare (WMEC-912) is a United States Coast Guard medium endurance cutter. Legare was laid down July 11, 1986 at Derecktor Shipyards of Middletown, Rhode Island. She was named for Hugh Swinton Legare, a former United States Attorney General under President John Tyler. Legare was delivered December 1, 1989 and was commissioned August 4, 1990 at her original homeport of Portsmouth, Virginia.

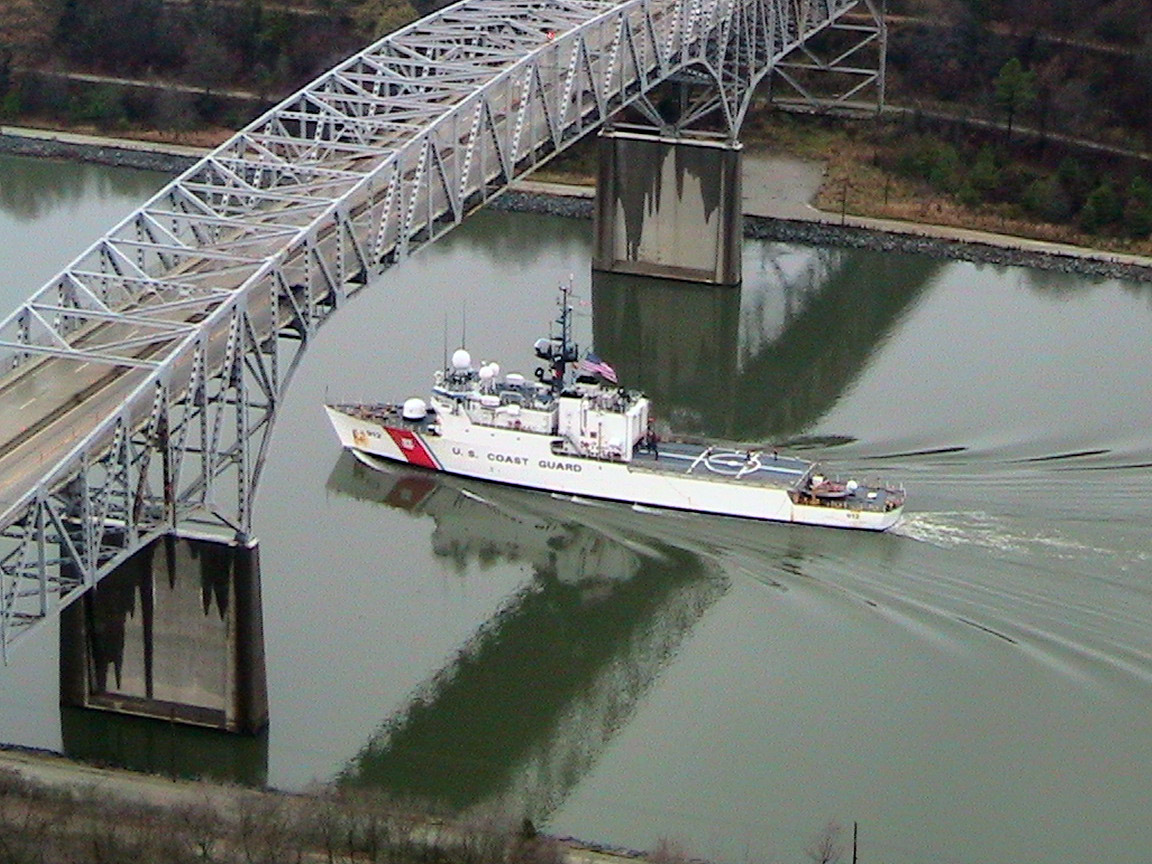
USCGC Legare transits the Chesapeake Bay

In 2009 the Legare participated in joint patrols with vessels of African nations.

The Legare arrived at the Coast Guard Yard on June 24, 2024 to begin a major overhaul. The work was carried out under the Service Life Extension Program and is collectively referred to as the "SLEP". It is intended to increase the cutter's lifetime by up to ten years by replacing her obsolete equipment and by generally making her easier to maintain. In particular, the Legare's main diesel engines were replaced. The other areas on which the SLEP concentrated were the cutter's weapons system, electrical system and hull. The Legare was scheduled to spend 15 months in SLEP. Upon completion of the SLEP, Legare departed the Coast Guard Yard on July 22, 2026 en route to her new homeport of Newport, Rhode Island.
