= SLNS Samudravijaya =

Sri Lanka Navy Reliance-class cutter

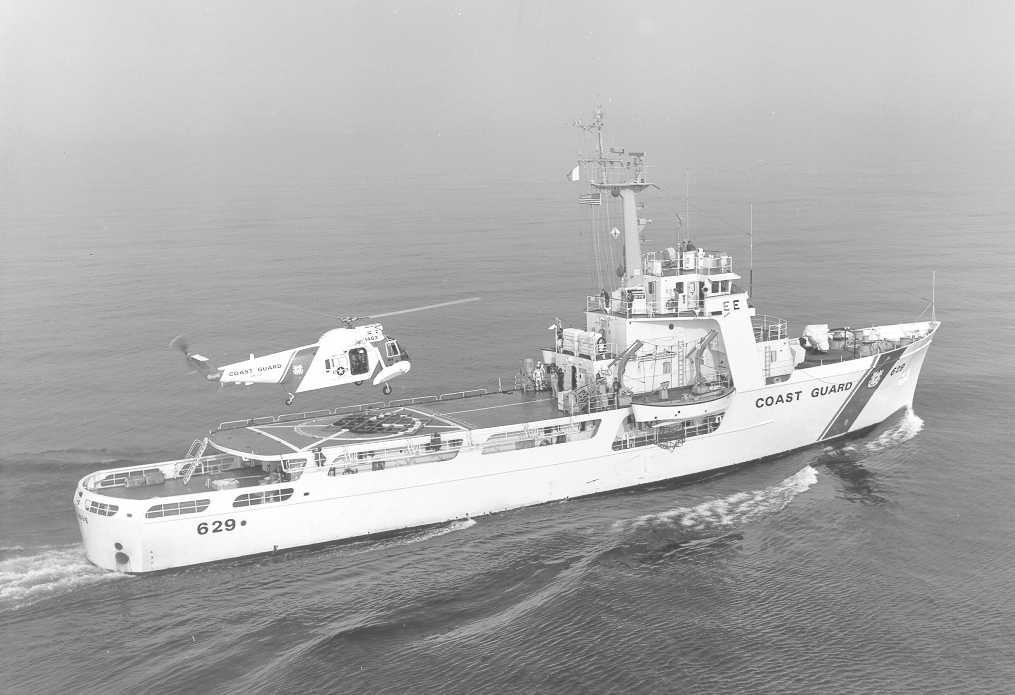
- SLNS Samudravijaya (P628), formerly USCGC Decisive (WMEC-629)

History

Sri Lanka
- Name: SLNS Samudravijaya
- Operator: Sri Lanka Navy
- Builder: United States Coast Guard Yard, Curtis Bay, Maryland
- Laid down: 12 May 1967
- Launched: 14 December 1967
- Acquired: 2 December 2025
- Commissioned: 4 June 2026
- Identification: Pennant number: P628
- Status: Active

United States
- Name: USCGC Decisive
- Operator: United States Coast Guard
- Builder: United States Coast Guard Yard, Curtis Bay, Maryland
- Laid down: 12 May 1967
- Launched: 14 December 1967
- Commissioned: 23 August 1968
- Decommissioned: 2 March 2023
- Home port: Naval Air Station Pensacola, Pensacola, Florida
- Identification: MMSI number: 367298000; Callsign: NUHC
- Motto: Dedicated to Duty
- Fate: Transferred to Sri Lanka
- Status: Inactive in US service
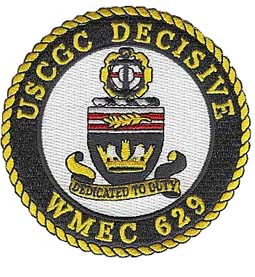
- Badge

General characteristics
- Class & type: Reliance Class
- Type: Medium Endurance Cutter
- Displacement: 1100 tons
- Length: 210 ft 6 in (64.16 m)
- Beam: 34 ft (10 m)
- Draught: 18 ft 0 in (5.49 m) max
- Propulsion: 2 x V16 2550 horsepower ALCO diesel engines
- Speed: max 18 knots; 2,700 mile range
- Range: cruise 14 knots; 6,100 mile range
- Complement: 12 officers, 63 enlisted
- Sensors & processing systems: 2 x AN/SPS-64
- Armament: 1 × Mk 38 25mm machine gun; 2 × M2HB .50 caliber machine gun
- Aircraft carried: HH-65 Dolphin

SLNS Samudravijaya (P628) is a Reliance-class medium endurance cutter in service with the Sri Lanka Navy. She was formerly USCGC Decisive (WMEC-629) of the United States Coast Guard.

Decisive's keel was laid on 12 May 1967, at the United States Coast Guard Yard in Baltimore, Maryland. She was launched 14 December 1967, and commissioned 23 August 1968. Following her commissioning in 1968, the ship was homeported in New Castle, New Hampshire. The cutter moved homeports several times during its tenure, including St. Petersburg, Florida and Pascagoula, Mississippi before its final assignment to Pensacola, Florida. It was decommissioned on 2 March 2023.

In early 2024, preliminary discussions began between U.S. and Sri Lanka officials concerning the modernization and later transfer of Decisive to the Sri Lanka Navy. It was formally handed over to Sri Lanka at a ceremony in Baltimore on 2 December 2025. The ship's Sri Lanka Navy pennant number is P628. It joined three other former U.S. Coast Guard cutters in the Sri Lanka Navy: SLNS Samudura (P261), SLNS Gajabahu (P626), and SLNS Vijayabahu (P627). Samudravijaya was formally commissioned into the Sri Lanka Navy on 4 June 2026, after a historic 12,000-nautical-mile voyage from the United States.
