= USCGC Diligence =

Reliance-class cutter

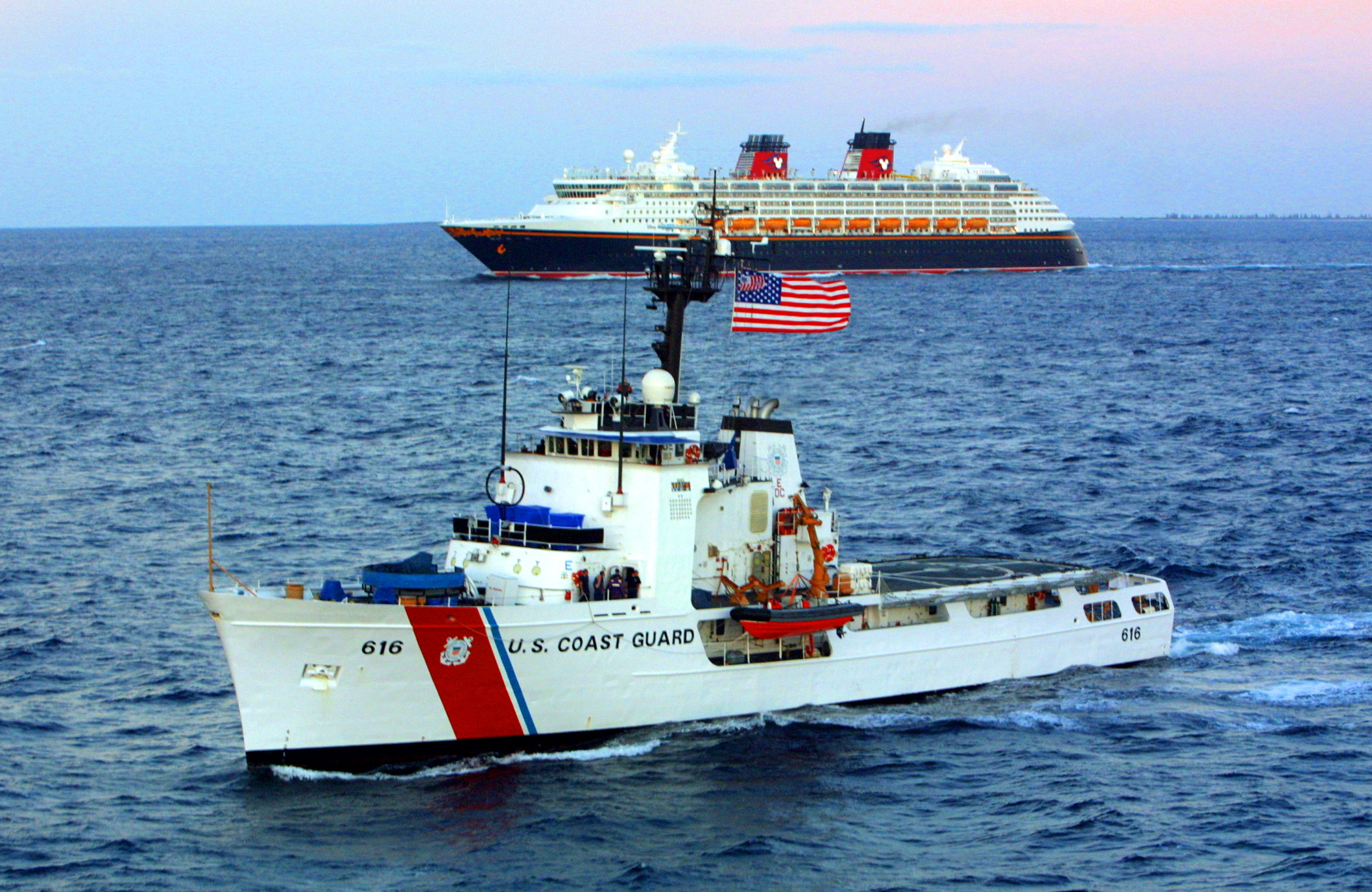
- USCGC Diligence in 2002

History

United States
- Builder: Todd Shipyards, Houston, Texas
- Acquired: 20 July 1963
- Commissioned: 1964
- Home port: Pensacola, Florida
- Identification: MMSI number: 367267000; Callsign: NMUD
- Status: Active
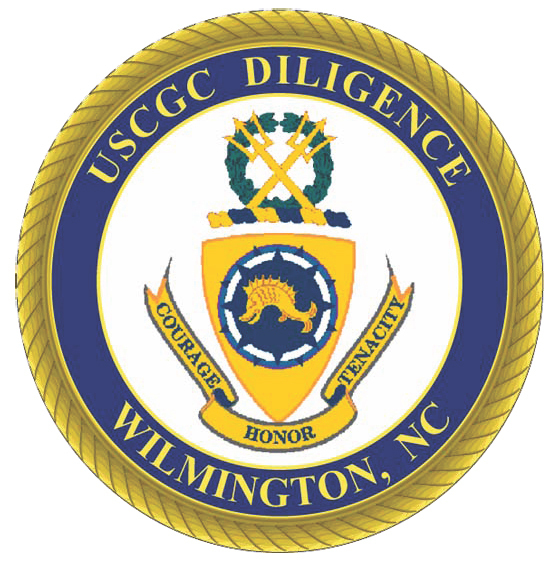
- Badge

General characteristics
- Displacement: 759 tons
- Length: 210 ft 6 in (64.16 m)
- Beam: 34 ft (10 m)
- Draft: 10 ft 6 in (3.20 m) max
- Propulsion: 2 x V16 2550 horsepower ALCO diesel engines
- Speed: max 18 knots; 2,700-mile range
- Range: cruise 14 knots; 6,100-mile range
- Complement: 12 officers, 63 enlisted
- Sensors & processing systems: 2 x AN/SPS-64
- Armament: 1 × Mk 38 25mm autocannon; 2 × M2HB .50 caliber machine gun
- Aircraft carried: HH-65 Dolphin

USCGC Diligence (WMEC-616) is a Reliance-class United States Coast Guard 210-foot medium endurance cutter formerly based in Wilmington, NC but now based in Pensacola, Florida. Diligence was the second of 16 cutters built from 1962 to 1968. Fourteen of this class of cutter are still in active U.S. service, and two have been transferred to foreign navies.

All Reliance-class cutters were built with dual shafts and controllable pitch propellers, and were capable of speeds up to 18 knots.

== History ==
Diligence, the sixth US Coast Guard cutter to bear that name, originally moored in Key West, Florida, later after it completed upgrades during MMA/MEP, was relocated to downtown Wilmington, North Carolina. Diligence is capable of performing any of the missions that white-hulled Coast Guard cutters traditionally perform, ranging from alien migrant interdiction operations (AMIO) and drug interdiction missions down in the Caribbean, to fisheries protection of the Atlantic seaboard, to search and rescue (SAR) anywhere in between. The SAR capabilities are enhanced by utilizing helicopters to extend the reach of the cutters well beyond the horizon.

On 24 January 2019, the Coast Guard announced that the Diligence would be homeported in Pensacola, Florida by 30 September 2020. Diligence departed Wilmington for the last time on 25 May 2020.

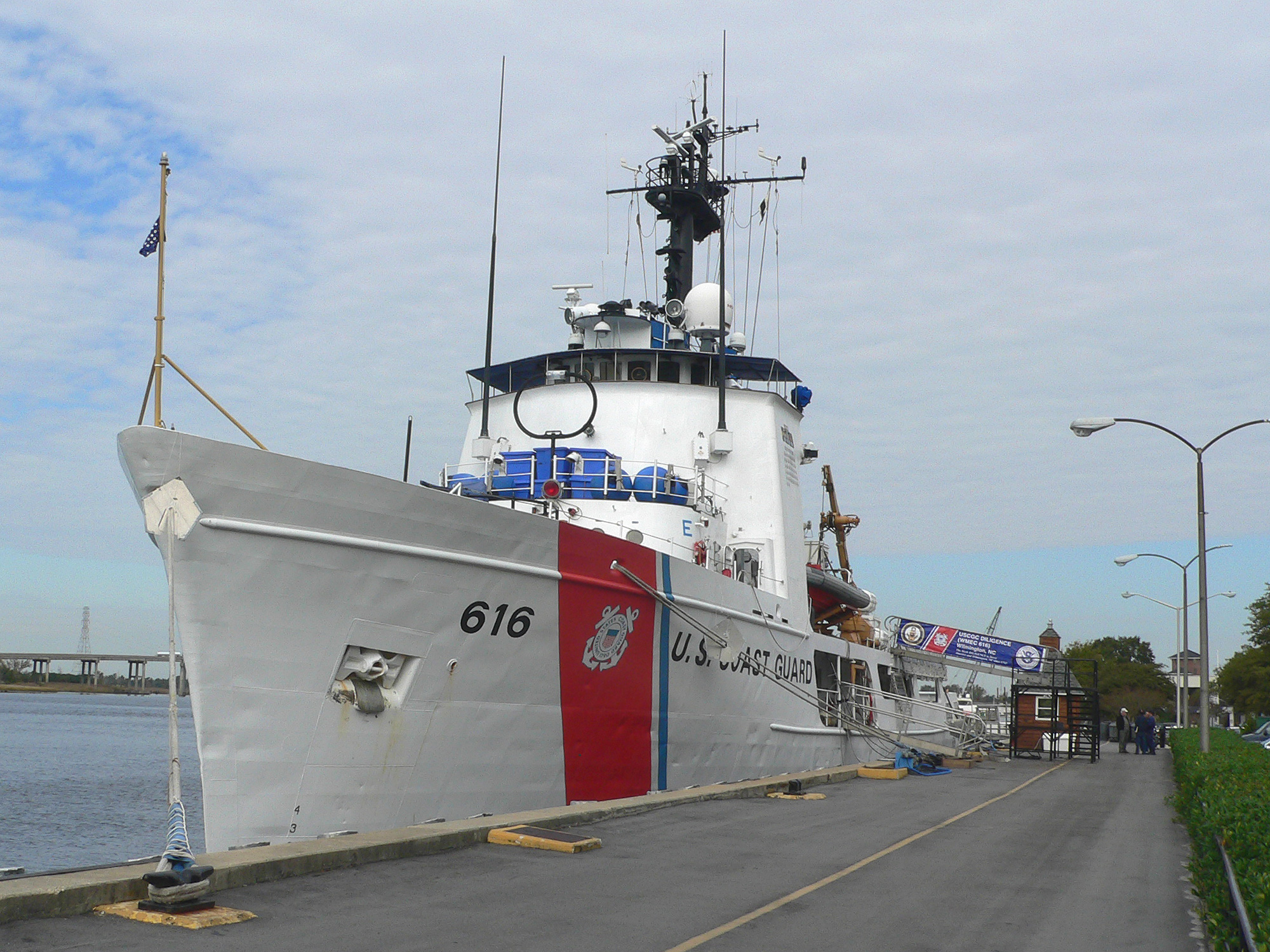
The Diligence docked at her former home port in Wilmington, North Carolina

The cutter Diligence was seen in the 1966 science fiction movie Around the World Under the Sea starring Lloyd Bridges. USCGC Diligence also appeared in the Matlock TV series in the episode "The Heist".
