= Cutter Boat – Over the Horizon =

Rigid-hulled inflatable boat in service with the United States Coast Guard

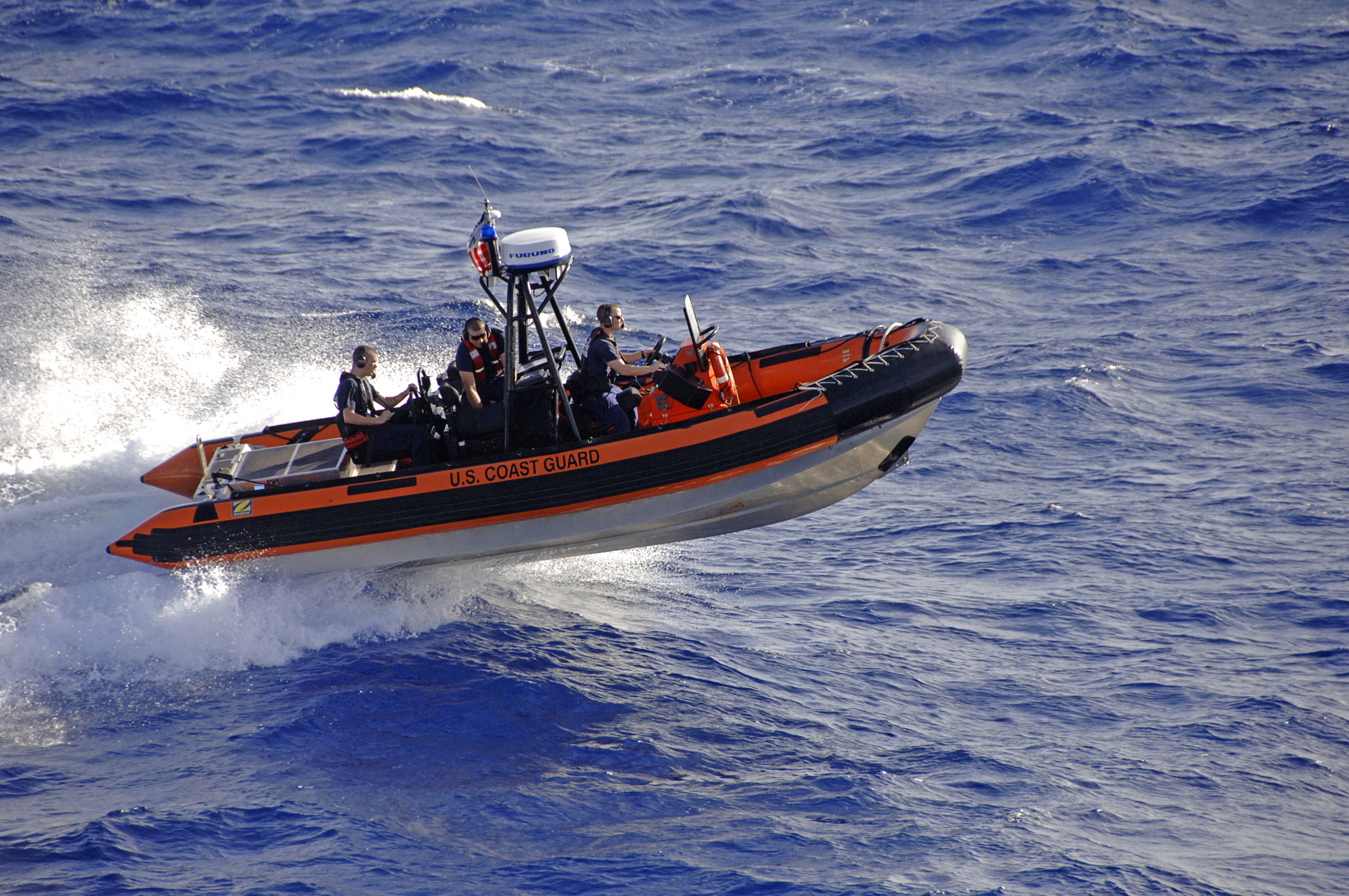
An over the horizon boat from USCGC Reliance

The Cutter Boat – Over the Horizon (CB-OTH), is a cutter-deployed rigid-hulled inflatable boat in service with the United States Coast Guard. It is designed to pursue and interdict fast, non-compliant vessels. As of March 2018, 78 boats have been delivered, and deployed on a variety of cutters, including the Maritime Security Cutters, Hamilton-class High Endurance Cutters, and Famous and Reliance-class Medium Endurance Cutters, and the Sentinel-class cutters. Eventually, at least 101 boats will be deployed.

== Design ==
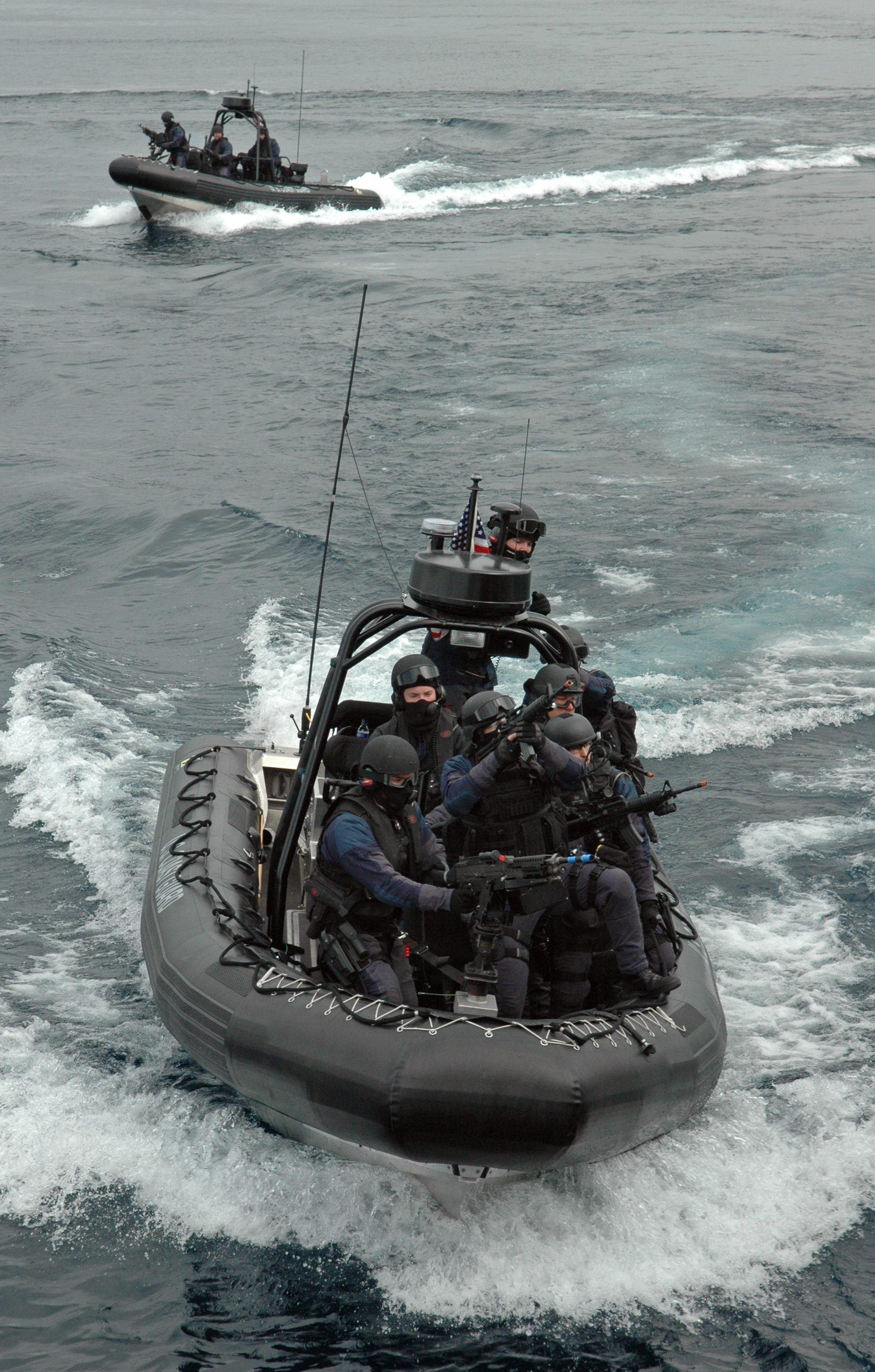
Maritime Safety and Security Team members aboard an OTH boat. A black sponson and M240B machine gun are visible.

The Over the Horizon boat is 24.75 feet (7.54 m) in length. Its fourth generation is manufactured by SAFE Boats International of Port Orchard, Washington. It is part of a 101-boat order worth up to $58.9 million. The hull is fabricated 5086 marine grade aluminum and it has a 22-inch-diameter (560 mm) foam collar. It is an inboard/outboard design powered by a 500 hp (370 kW) Cummins diesel inboard engine, with a Hamilton jet drive.

The boats are equipped with radar, electronic compass, GPS, and other electronic navigation systems, loud-hailer, and both HF and VHF-FM radios. The boats come equipped with five special shock-absorbing seats, necessary because proceeding at high speed, over waves, could injure crewmember's spines.

A version of the boat with an all-black sponson and forward machine gun mount is used by Maritime Safety and Security Teams and the Maritime Security Response Team.

== Use ==
The Coast Guard's newer cutters, the National Security Cutter, Sentinel-class cutter, and the smaller Marine Protector-class cutter are designed with a stern launching ramp. Stern launching ramps permit the cutters to deploy and retrieve water-jet propelled boats, without first coming to a stop. The Marine Protector-class cutters require just a single crew member to remain on deck to control the deployment and retrieval of its jet boat.

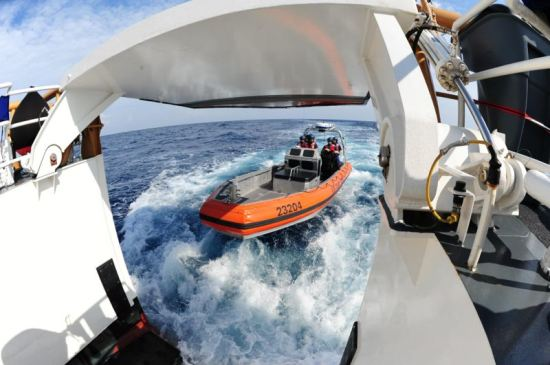
This Cutter Boat was photographed through the open door of USCGC Bernard C. Webber's stern launching ramp

== See also ==
- USCG Defender-class boat
