= USCGC Escanaba (WMEC-907) =

United States Coast Guard cutter

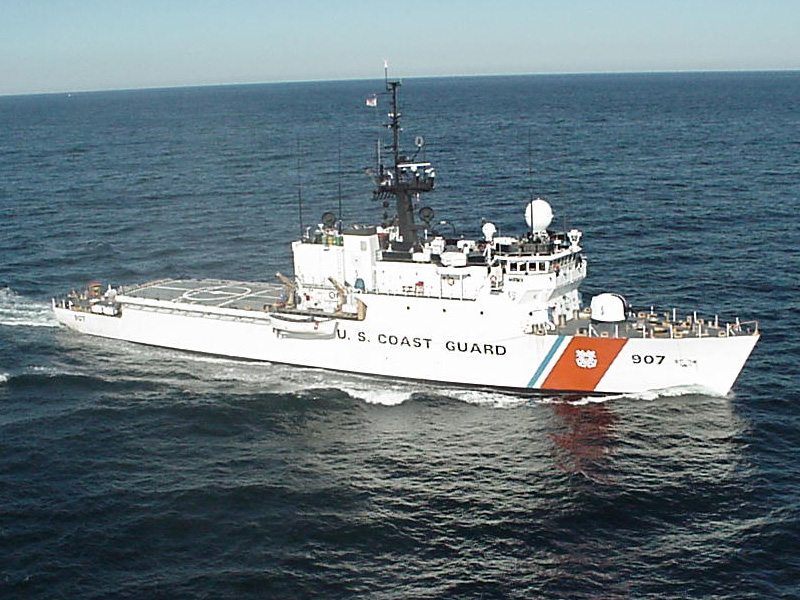
- USCGC Escanaba (WMEC-907)

History

United States
- Name: USCGC Escanaba
- Namesake: USCGC Escanaba (WPG-77)
- Builder: Derecktor Shipyards, Middletown, Rhode Island
- Laid down: April 1, 1983
- Launched: February 6, 1985
- Commissioned: August 29, 1987 Grand Haven, Michigan
- Home port: Portsmouth, Virginia
- Identification: MMSI number: 367262000; Callsign: NNAS
- Motto: The Spirit Lives On.
- Status: Active
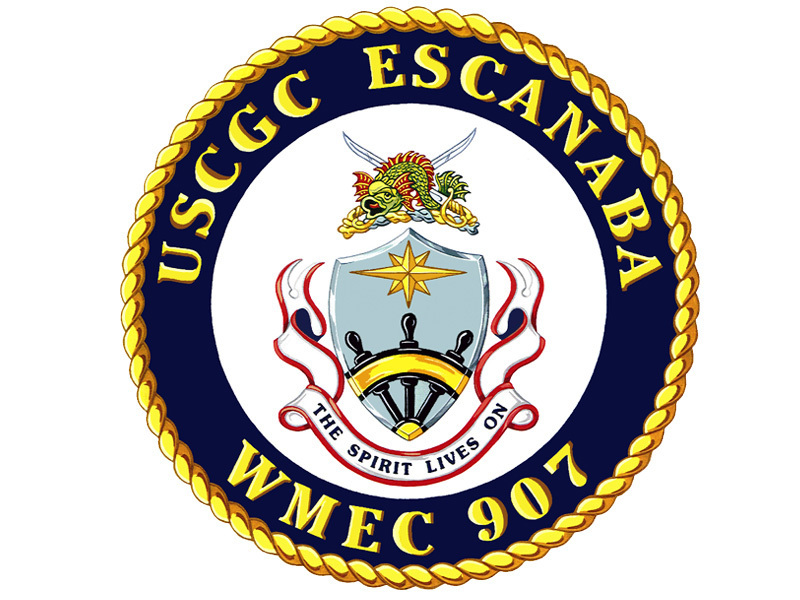
- Badge

General characteristics
- Class & type: Famous-class cutter
- Displacement: 1,800 long tons (1,829 t)
- Length: 270 ft (82 m)
- Beam: 38 ft (12 m)
- Draft: 14.5 ft (4.4 m)
- Propulsion: Twin turbo-charged ALCO V-18 diesel engines
- Speed: 19.5 knots (36.1 km/h; 22.4 mph)
- Range: 9,900 nautical miles (18,300 km; 11,400 mi)
- Endurance: 14-21 days
- Boats & landing craft carried: 1 × Over-the-Horizon (OTH) Interceptor; 1 × RHI with twin 90 HP outboard engines
- Complement: 100 personnel (14 officers, 86 enlisted)
- Sensors & processing systems: MK 92 Fire Control Radar; SPS-73 Surface Search Radar
- Electronic warfare & decoys: AN/SLQ-32 (receive only) 2 x Mark 36 SRBOC
- Armament: 1 × Mk 75 76 mm/62 caliber naval gun; 2 × .50 caliber (12.7 mm) machine guns
- Aircraft carried: HH-65 Dolphin; HH-60 Jayhawk

USCGC Escanaba (WMEC-907) is a United States Coast Guard medium endurance cutter based in Portsmouth, Virginia. Her keel was laid on April 1, 1983, at Derecktor Shipyards, Middletown, Rhode Island. She was launched February 6, 1985 and is named for her predecessor, USCGC Escanaba (WPG-77) which sank during World War Two, and was named for the Escanaba River and Escanaba, Michigan. Escanaba (WMEC-907) was formally commissioned August 29, 1987 in Grand Haven, Michigan, the home port of her predecessor.

== Service ==
A boarding party from Escanaba was fired upon by the crew of a suspected drug smuggling go-fast boat on 14 September 2010. The go-fast escaped when it entered Nicaraguan waters, but no Coast Guard personnel were injured.

Escanaba participated in the 2017 Joint Interagency Task Force South with various other naval forces. During the exercise, Escanaba interdicted 2 smuggling vessels, the cutter also participated in numerous exercises at sea focusing on various warfare areas including maritime interdiction operations, naval gun-fire support, tactical maneuvering and formation steaming, and search and rescue.

Between the 20th and 21 May 2019, Escanaba interdicted three small vessels in the Mona Pass carrying 68 migrants attempting to reach Puerto Rico from the Dominican Republic. The first two vessels were detected by the crew of a U.S. Customs and Border Protection DHC-8 maritime patrol aircraft on the night of 20 May 2019. The first boat was located 43 nautical miles north of Aguadilla, Puerto Rico, while the second was detected approximately 15 nautical miles northwest of Desecheo Island, Puerto Rico. Both vessels were transiting the Mona Pass without navigational lights. Coast Guard Watchstanders in Sector San Juan diverted Escanaba to interdict the suspect vessels. Shortly thereafter, she interdicted a 20-foot makeshift boat with 19 adult migrants on board. The cutter's crew embarked 14 men and five women, who claimed Dominican nationality. Following the first interdiction, Escanaba proceeded to intercept the second migrant vessel. Once on scene, an Escanaba small boat crew and a CBP Caribbean Air and Marine interceptor surface unit stopped a 25-foot makeshift boat with 21 adult migrants on board. Escanaba crew embarked 18 men and three women of Dominican nationality. The third vessel to be interdicted was detected by the crew of a CBP DHC-8 maritime patrol aircraft on the night of 21 May 2019, approximately 20 nautical miles northwest of Aguadilla. Escanaba crew interdicted the 30-foot makeshift boat and safely embarked 28 adult migrants, 21 men and seven women of Dominican nationality, as well as a Haitian man. 66 of the migrants were transferred to a Dominican Republic Navy vessel for repatriation. Two migrants facing felony criminal charges for attempted illegal reentry into a U.S. territory, one Dominican Republic man and one Haitian man, were transferred to USCGC Richard Dixon (WPB-1113) for further transfer to Ramey Sector Border Patrol agents in Mayaguez, Puerto Rico.

== Images ==
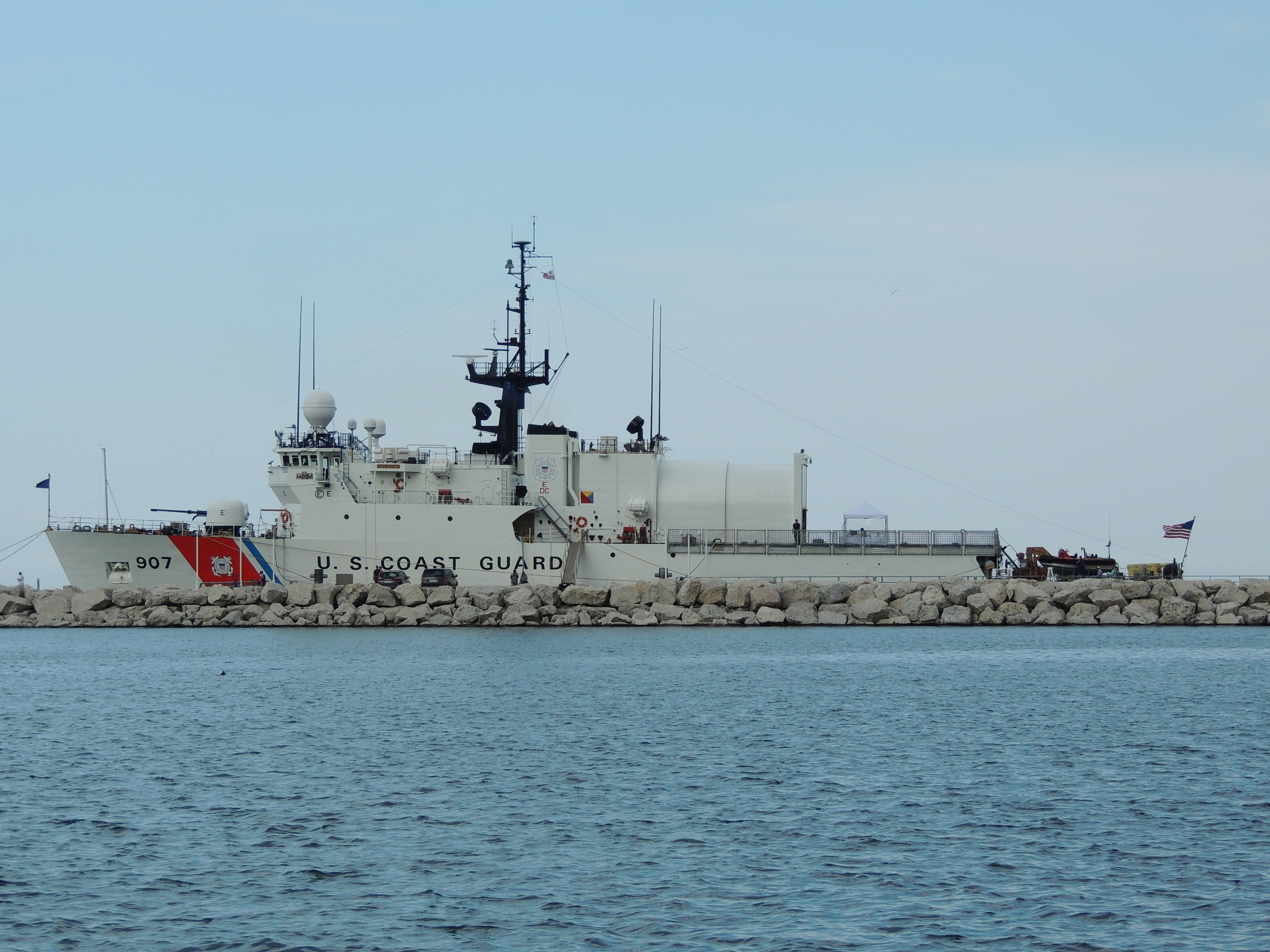
Coast Guard Cutter Escanaba (WMEC-907) docked in Milwaukee Harbor in 2018

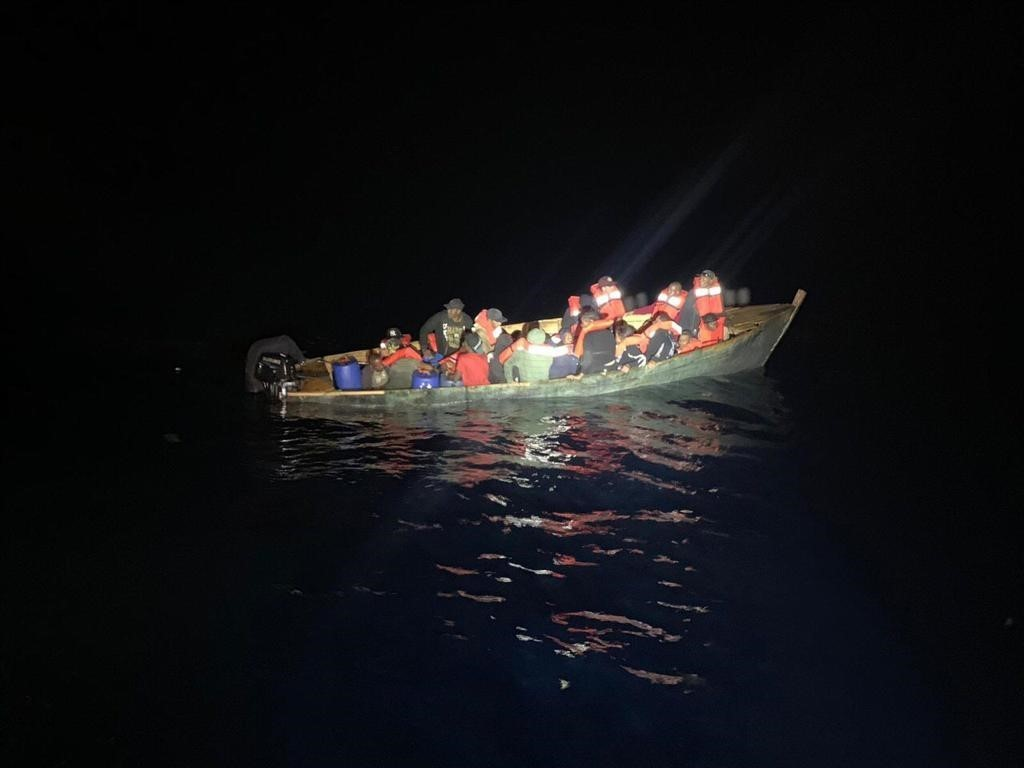
Coast Guard Cutter Escanaba (WMEC-907) intercepted this 30-foot makeshift boat with 28 migrants on board in the Mona Passage on May 21, 2019

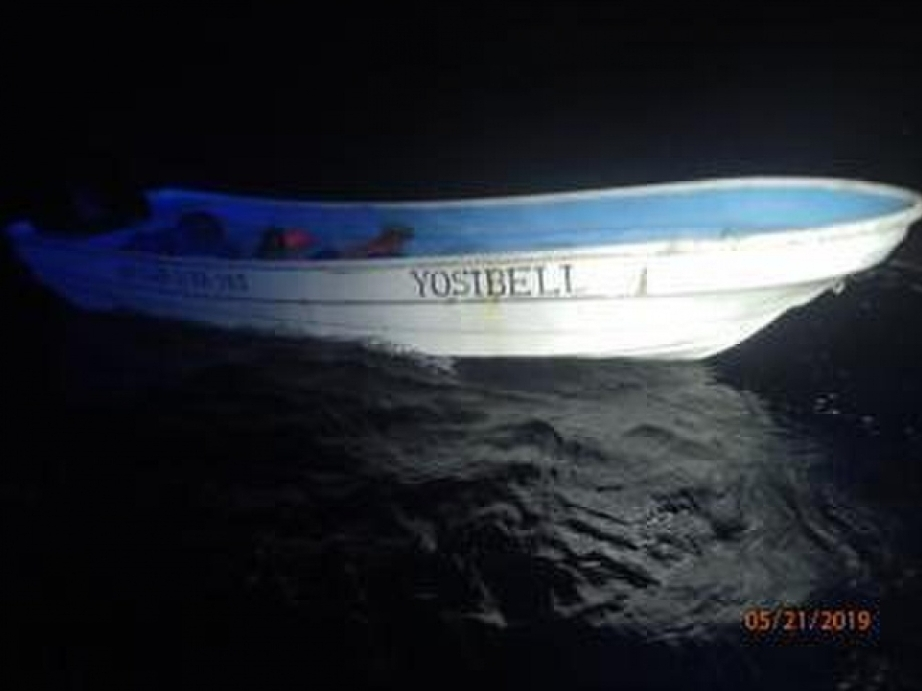
Coast Guard Cutter Escanaba (WMEC-907) intercepted the Yosibell, a 25-foot makeshift boat with 21 migrants on board, in the Mona Passage on May 20, 2019

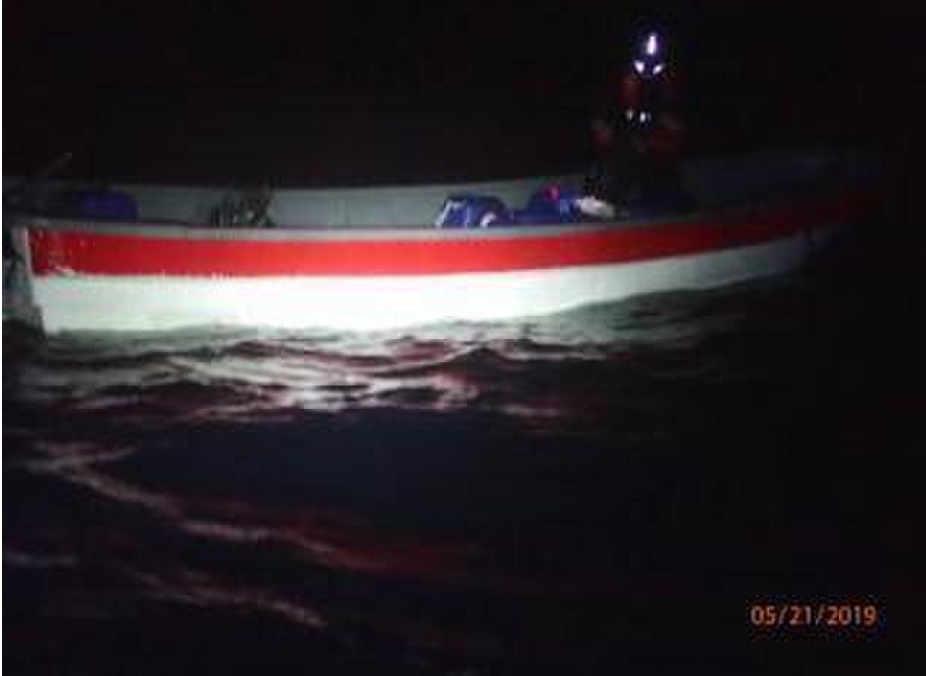
Coast Guard Cutter Escanaba (WMEC-907) intercepted this 20-foot makeshift vessel with 19 migrants on board in the Mona Passage on May 20, 2019

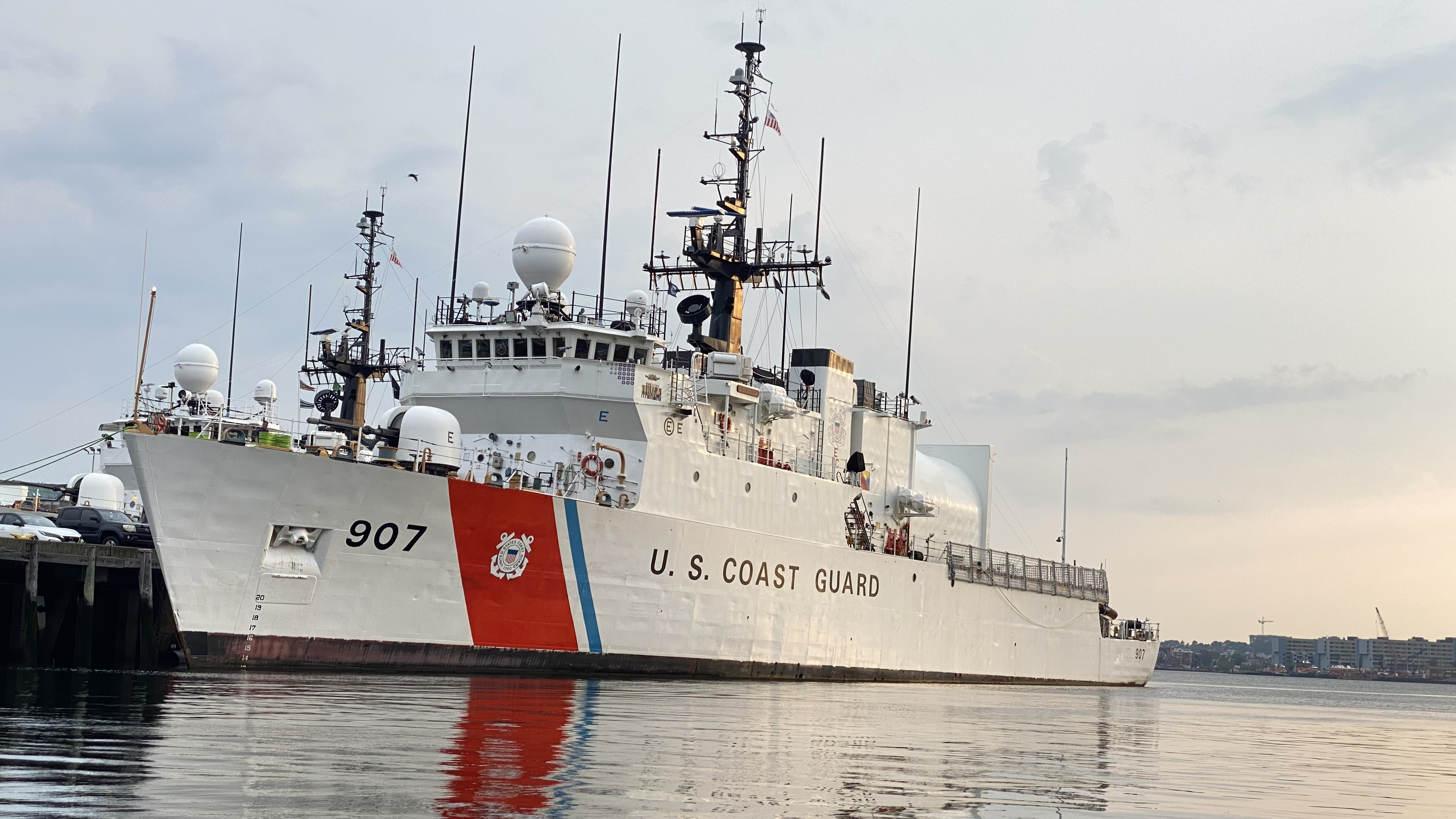
USCGC Escanaba at port in Boston Harbor, June 2021.
