= USCGC Seneca (WMEC-906) =

American Famous-class Coast Guard cutter

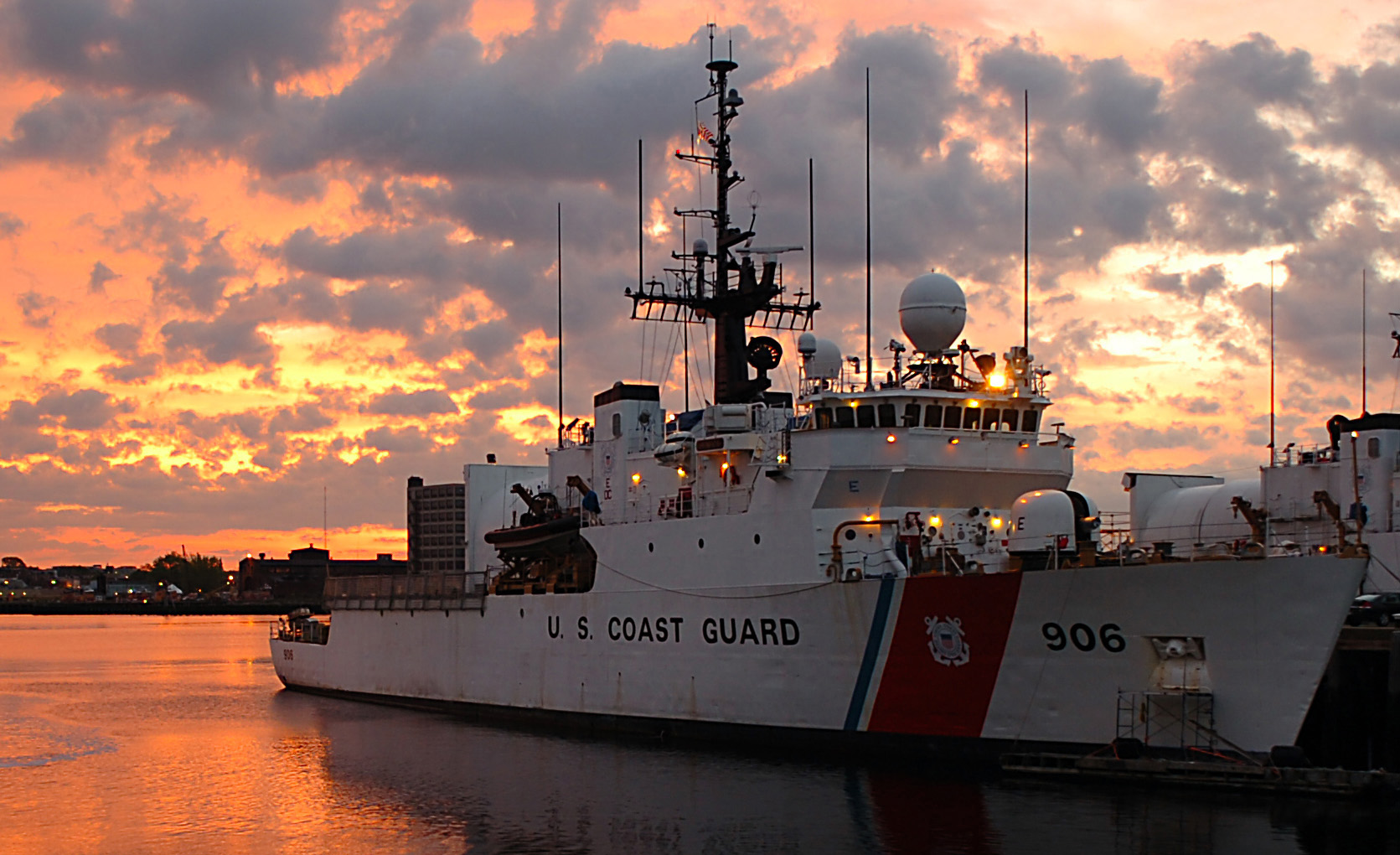
- USCGC Seneca (WMEC-906)

History

United States
- Name: USCGC Seneca
- Namesake: USCGC Seneca (1908)
- Builder: Derecktor Shipyards, Middletown, Rhode Island
- Laid down: September 16, 1982
- Launched: June 16, 1984
- Commissioned: May 9, 1987
- Home port: Portsmouth, Virginia
- Identification: MMSI number: 367285000; Callsign: NFMK
- Motto: A tradition of honor, a legacy of action
- Status: Active
- Badge

General characteristics
- Class & type: Famous-class cutter
- Displacement: 1,800 long tons (1,829 t)
- Length: 270 ft (82 m)
- Beam: 38 ft (12 m)
- Draft: 14.5 ft (4.4 m)
- Propulsion: Twin turbo-charged ALCO V-18 diesel engines
- Speed: 19.5 knots (36.1 km/h; 22.4 mph)
- Range: 9,900 nautical miles (18,300 km; 11,400 mi)
- Endurance: 14-21 days
- Boats & landing craft carried: 1 × Over-the-Horizon (OTH) Interceptor; 1 × RHI with twin 90 HP outboard engines
- Complement: 100 personnel (14 officers, 86 enlisted)
- Sensors & processing systems: MK 92 Fire Control Radar; SPS-73 Surface Search Radar
- Electronic warfare & decoys: AN/SLQ-32 (receive only)
- Armament: 1 × Mk 75 76 mm/62 caliber naval gun; 2 × .50 caliber (12.7 mm) machine guns
- Aircraft carried: HH-65 Dolphin; HH-60 Jayhawk; MH-68 Stingray

USCGC Seneca (WMEC-906) is a United States Coast Guard medium endurance cutter. Her keel was laid on September 16, 1982, at Derecktor Shipyards, Middletown, Rhode Island. She was launched June 16, 1984 and commissioned active August 4, 1986 and formally commissioned May 9, 1987. Her namesake is the first revenue cutter Seneca active from 1908 to 1936.

Seneca is the sixth of thirteen 270' Famous-class cutters designed to take the Coast Guard past the year 2000. The advanced technology used in her construction gives her the potential of being an effective Search and rescue (SAR) and Maritime Law Enforcement (MLE) platform. Advanced technology is only one way to describe Seneca's primary operating computer system, SCCS (Shipboard Command and Control System). SCCS allows operators to view or act upon information from any of the ship's sensors, radar sources, or radio transceivers. Also included in SCCS is a Low Level Light TV (LLLTV) camera and an optical sight. Images from both the LLLTV and optical sight, can be displayed to any of SCCS position or the ship's entertainment system.

The Seneca serves as a platform for Operation New Frontier; the Coast Guard's operation to employ armed helicopters and non-lethal use of force technology to stop drug laden go-fast vessels. Seneca's actions contributed to the one hundred percent interdiction rate during Operation New Frontier, making it the most successful counter-drug operation in Coast Guard history. Six drug smuggling go-fasts were stopped, 4,475 pounds of cocaine and 11,710 pounds of marijuana with a street value of over 125 million dollars seized, and 18 drug trafficking suspects arrested. The success of Operation New Frontier, marked a new era in Coast Guard law enforcement and maritime security efforts, and achieved a principal milestone in the Coast Guard's successful execution of the President's National Drug Control Strategy.

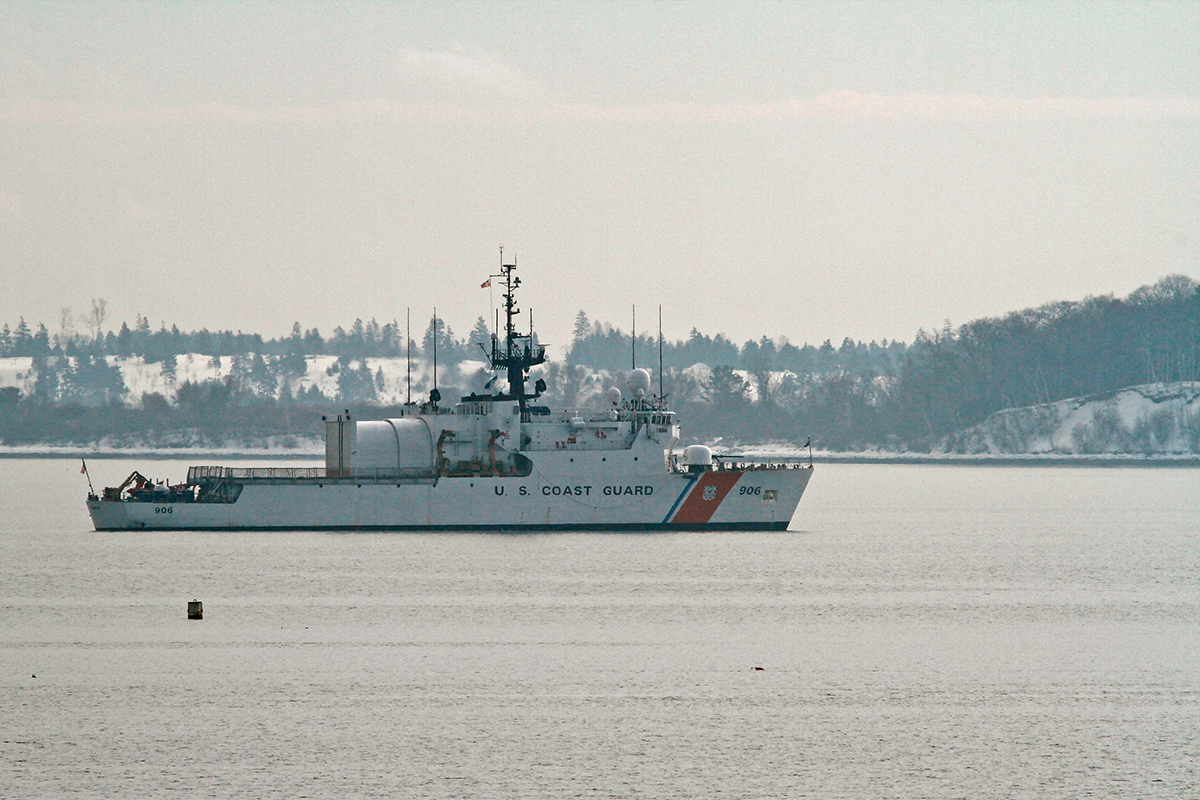
The cutter Seneca in the Casco Bay in Falmouth, ME. Chebeague and Little Chebeague Island behind her.
