= USCGC Reliance (WMEC-615) =

United States Coast Guard Cutter

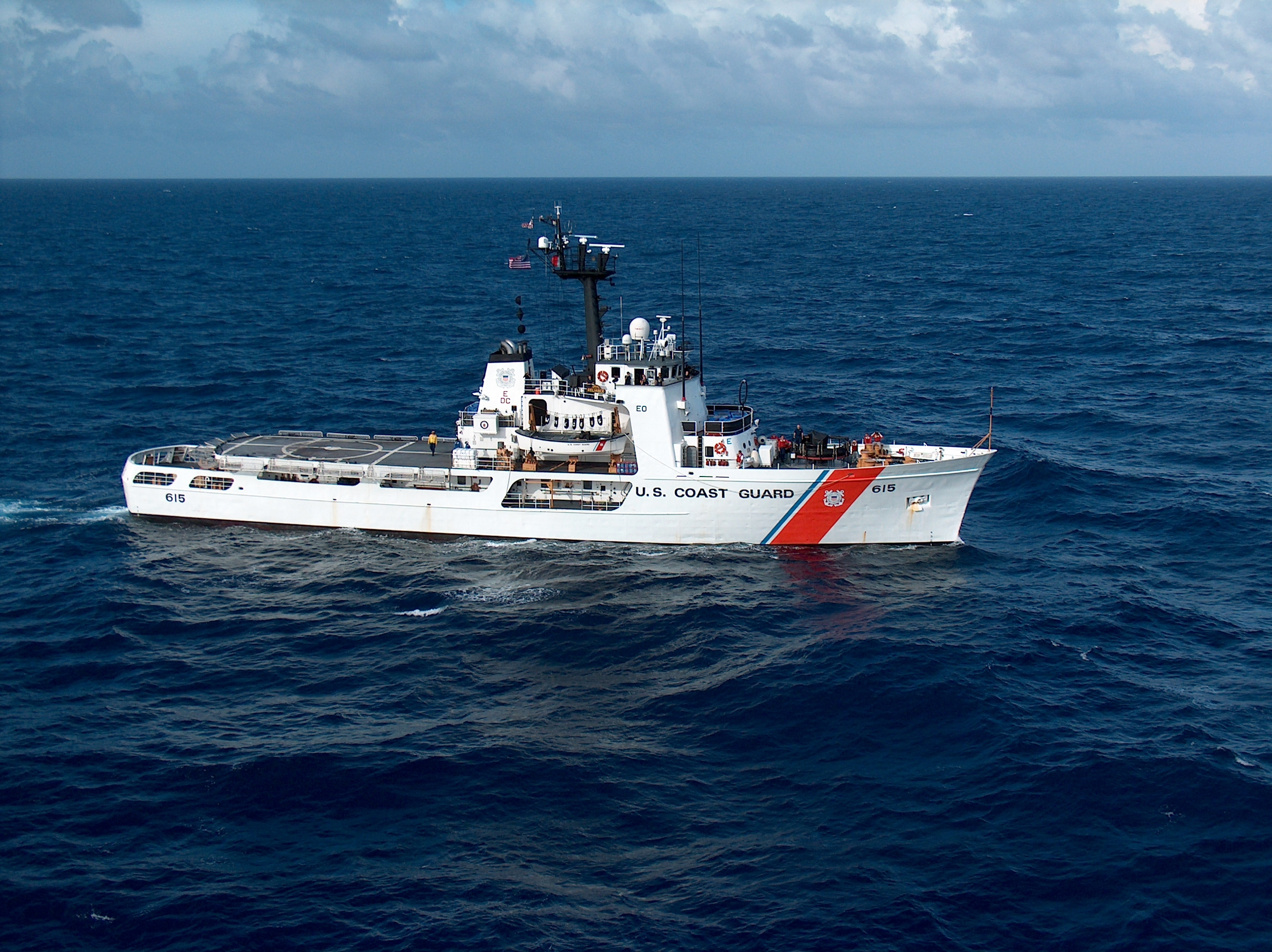
- USCGC Reliance (WMEC-615)

History

United States
- Builder: Todd Shipyards, Houston, Texas
- Commissioned: 1964
- Home port: Pensacola, Florida
- Identification: MMSI number: 367297000; Callsign: NJPJ
- Motto: First in the Fleet
- Status: In active service

General characteristics
- Displacement: 1108.9 tons
- Length: 210 ft 6 in (64.16 m)
- Beam: 34 ft (10 m)
- Draught: 10 ft 6 in (3.20 m) max
- Propulsion: Originally, 2 x Cooper-Bessemer Corporation FVBM-12 turbocharged diesel engines plus two Solar Saturn 1000 HP gas turbines (CODAG) on the first five ships of the class (615 thru 619 hull numbers); Currently, 2 x V16 2550 horsepower ALCO diesel engines
- Speed: max 18 knots; 2,700 mile range
- Range: cruise 14 knots; 6,100 mile range
- Complement: 12 officers, 63 enlisted
- Sensors & processing systems: 2 x AN/SPS-64
- Armament: 1 × Mk 38 25mm auto cannon; 2 × M2HB .50 caliber machine gun
- Aircraft carried: HH-65 Dolphin

USCGC Reliance (WMEC-615) is a United States Coast Guard medium endurance cutter. She is the fourth Revenue Cutter / Coast Guard Cutter to bear the name Reliance and the first of the 210' Medium Endurance Cutter Fleet. Constructed by Todd Shipyards in Houston, Texas and commissioned in 1964, she was originally homeported in Corpus Christi, Texas. Her duties included offshore oil rig inspections, fisheries, counter drug, alien migrant interdiction, marine pollution patrols, and search and rescue. Reliance has been homeported in Yorktown, Virginia, Port Canaveral, Florida, New Castle, New Hampshire and Portsmouth, New Hampshire. As of May 2019, she is stationed at the Naval Air Station Pensacola in Pensacola, Florida.
