= USCGC Tahoma (WMEC-908) =

American Famous-class Coast Guard cutter

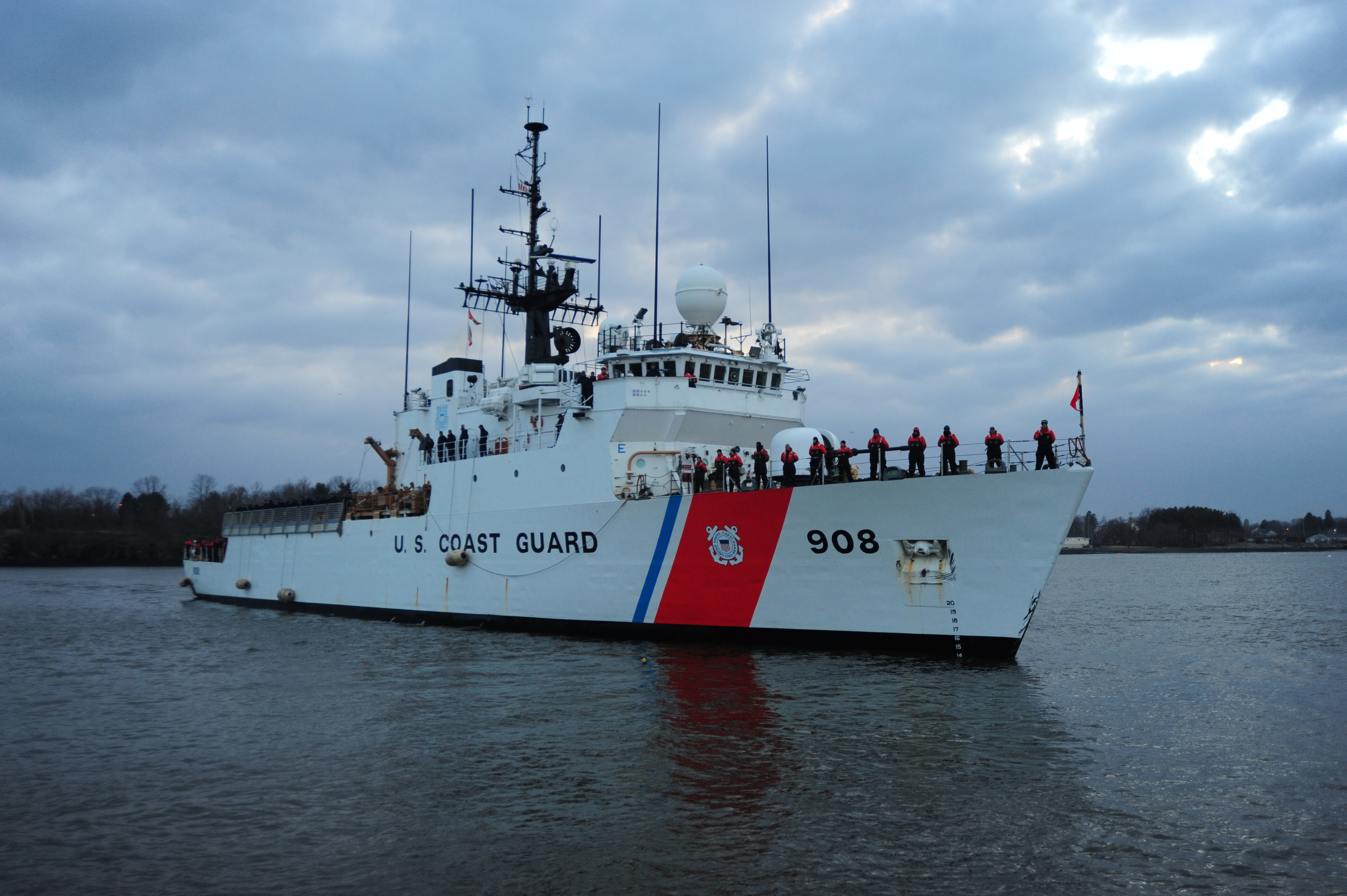
- USCGC Tahoma (WMEC-908) at Kittery Maine, February 2010

History

United States
- Name: USCGC Tahoma
- Builder: Derecktor Shipyards, Middletown, Rhode Island
- Laid down: June 28, 1983
- Acquired: August 12, 1987
- Commissioned: April 6, 1988
- Home port: Naval Station Newport in Newport, Rhode Island
- Identification: MMSI number: 367288000; Callsign: NCBE
- Motto: Courage, Justice, Compassion
- Nickname(s): Mighty T, Never-Homa
- Status: Active
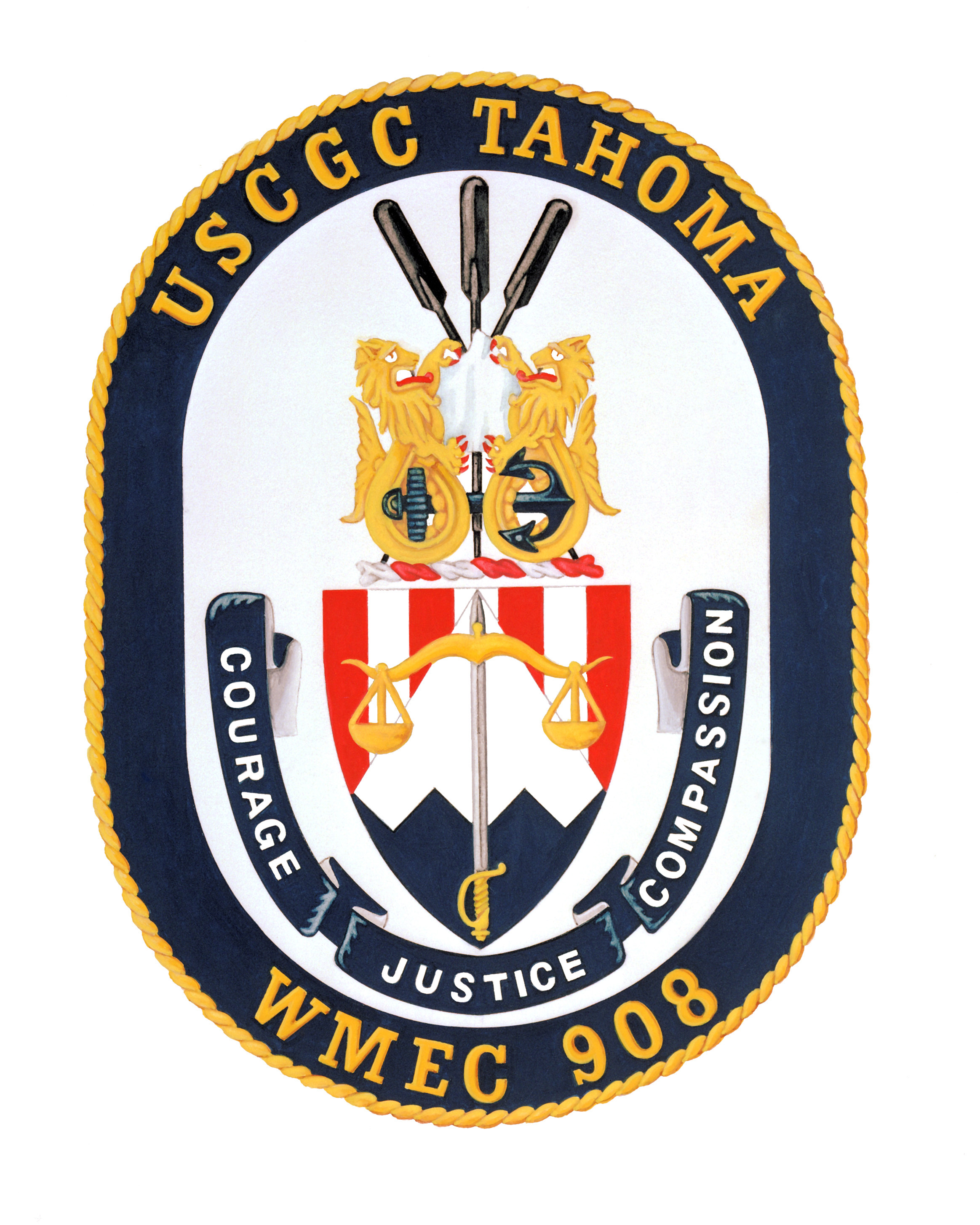
- Badge

General characteristics
- Class & type: Famous-class United States Coast Guard Cutter
- Displacement: 1,800 tons
- Length: 270 ft (82 m)
- Beam: 38 ft (12 m)
- Draught: 14.5 ft (4.4 m)
- Propulsion: Twin turbo-charged ALCO V-18 diesel engines
- Speed: 19.5 knots (36.1 km/h; 22.4 mph)
- Range: 9,900 nautical miles (18,300 km; 11,400 mi)
- Complement: 100 personnel (14 officers, 86 enlisted)
- Electronic warfare & decoys: AN/SLQ-32 (receive only)
- Armament: 1 OTO Melara Mk 75 76 mm/62 caliber naval gun; 2 × .50 caliber (12.7 mm) machine gun
- Aircraft carried: HH-65 Dolphin; HH-60 Jayhawk; MH-68 Stingray

USCGC Tahoma (WMEC-908) is a United States Coast Guard medium endurance cutter. Her keel was laid on June 28, 1983 at Derecktor Shipyards, Middletown, Rhode Island. She was delivered August 12, 1987 and commissioned April 6, 1988. She is the third cutter to bear the name Tahoma, which is the Northwest Pacific Indian word that refers to the Cascade Range mountain peak now known as Mount Rainier. Her nickname, Mighty T, was selected because it was the nickname of her predecessor, Tahoma (WPG-80), during World War II.

On 13 January 2010, the Tahoma was ordered to assist in the humanitarian relief efforts following the 2010 Haiti earthquake.

During the afternoon of 16 January 2010 a boy was born on board to a Haitian woman while Tahoma was transporting wounded survivors from Port-au-Prince to the still-functional medical facilities of Cap-Haïtien, to the north.

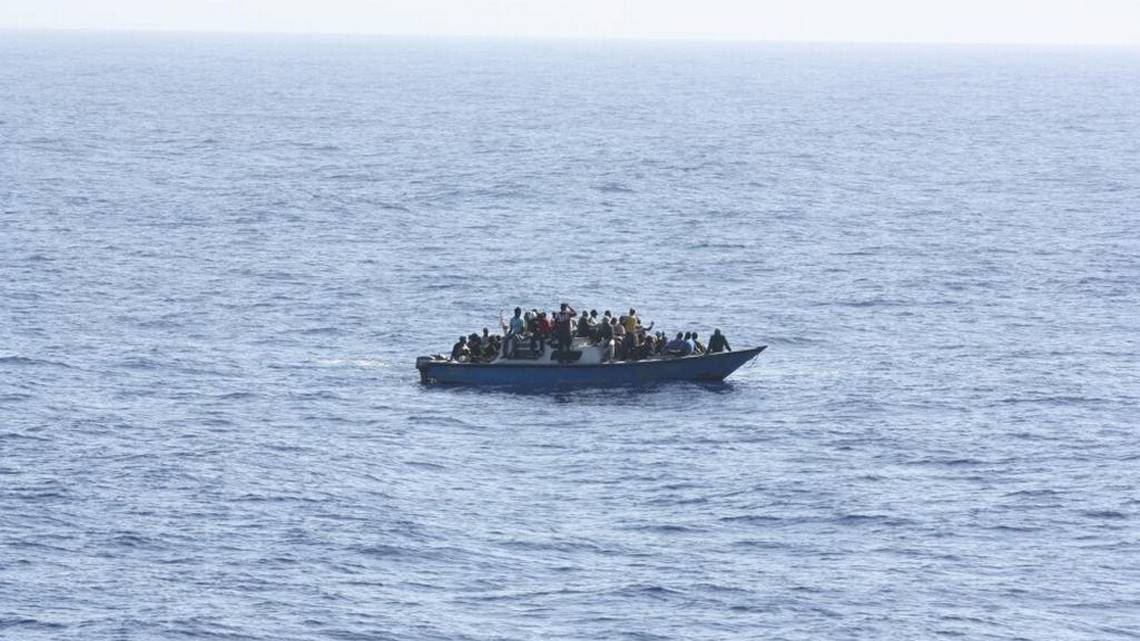
The Tahoma rescued almost 100 Haitian refugees from this dangerously overcrowded smuggling craft.

In March 2018 the Tahoma intercepted 201 Haitian undocumented immigrants, in Bahamanian waters.
