= USCGC Confidence =

US Coast Guard vessel

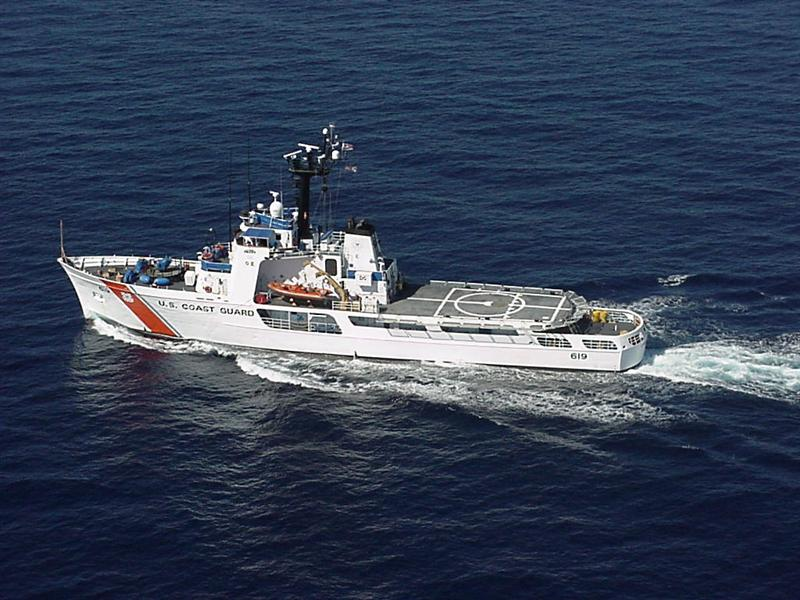
- USCGC Confidence (WMEC-619)

History

United States
- Builder: United States Coast Guard Yard, Curtis Bay, Maryland
- Launched: 1966
- Home port: Port Canaveral, Florida
- Identification: MMSI number: 367292000; Callsign: NHKW
- Motto: Mensura Excellentiae; Measure of Excellence
- Status: Active

General characteristics
- Displacement: 759 tons
- Length: 210 ft 6 in (64.16 m)
- Beam: 34 ft (10 m)
- Draft: 10 ft 6 in (3.20 m) max
- Propulsion: 2 x V16 2550 horsepower ALCO diesel engines
- Speed: max 18 knots; 2,700 mile range
- Range: cruise 14 knots; 6,100 mile range
- Complement: 12 officers, 63 enlisted
- Sensors & processing systems: 2 x AN/SPS-64
- Armament: 1 × Mk 38 25mm machine gun; 2 × M2HB .50 caliber machine gun
- Aircraft carried: HH-65 Dolphin

USCGC Confidence (WMEC-619) is a United States Coast Guard medium endurance cutter.

== History ==
Construction of the U.S. Coast Guard Cutter Confidence began at the United States Coast Guard Yard in Curtis Bay, Maryland, in 1965 and was completed in 1966. Fifth of 16 vessels in the class, Confidence was designed for search and rescue, law enforcement, and alien migrant interdiction operations (AMIO). She originally was assigned to the Seventeenth Coast Guard District for operations in the waters of Alaska, with her home port at Kodiak, Alaska, and began operating there in 1966. In 1968, she came to the aid of the three-man crew of the fishing vessel Chirikof, who had abandoned ship into a skiff without oars when Chirikof sank off Kodiak Island on 29 February and then drifted until sighted by the cargo ship Chena on 1 March; they were too weak from hypothermia to climb Chena's Jacob's ladder, so Confidence arrived on the scene and rescued them from the skiff. On 14 September 1981, Confidence rescued the six-man crew of the crab-fishing vessel City of Seattle after City of Seattle burned and sank in the Shelikof Strait five nautical miles (9.3 km; 5.8 mi) south of Cape Uganik (57°58′N 153°30′W) on the coast of Uganik Island in Alaska′s Kodiak Archipelago.

In the spring of 1983, following 17 years in Alaskan waters, Confidence was reassigned to the Thirteenth Coast Guard District and was home-ported in Port Angeles, Washington. During her time in the Pacific Northwest, Confidence's crew seized 17 foreign and U.S. vessels for violations of U.S. law. In January 1986, Confidence and her crew seized the Panamanian freighter Eagle 1 and her cargo of 506 pounds (230 kg) of cocaine. This was the largest maritime seizure of cocaine on the United States West Coast at the time.

Confidence was decommissioned and sent to the United States Coast Guard Yard in February 1987 for a major overhaul, referred to as a Midlife Maintenance Availability. Modifications included the installation of a new electronics package to increase the ship's effectiveness, new engines and smokestacks to increase efficiency, and habitability was improved. In October 1988, Confidence was commissioned back into service and sent to her new home port at Port Canaveral, Florida. The ship was normally assigned to patrol the waters off the southern coast of the United States, the Gulf of Mexico, and the Caribbean. Her primary missions were Counter Drug operations, Alien Migrant Interdiction Operations (AMIO), Homeland Security Operations, fisheries law enforcement, and Search and Rescue (SAR).

Starting in the fall of 1991, Confidence was heavily involved in AMIO, including the interdiction of Haitian, Cuban, and Dominican Republic migrants attempting to illegally enter the U.S. One highlight of these operations was Confidence's participation in Operation Able Vigil in 1993, and rescued 1,123 Cuban migrants in less than four weeks. The busiest day resulted in the interdiction of 346 migrants from 46 separate rafts and boats in just 16 hours. In Spring 1992, Confidence participated in Operation Able Manner, interdicting 428 Haitian migrants. Later that year, the ship was the primary platform for Operation Restore Dignity off the coast of Haiti, recovering 78 Haitians who perished when their ferry sank.

In 2001, Confidence was outfitted with an Over the Horizon rigid hull inflatable boat, designed to transport law enforcement teams at high speeds for long distances independent of the cutter.

From January 2003 until June 2005, Confidence interdicted over 1,100 Cuban, Haitian, and Dominican migrants with several noteworthy cases. In November 2004, Confidence rescued 82 migrants from a 28-foot (8.5 m) Haitian sailing vessel taking on water off the coast of the Bahamas. In January 2005, Confidence crewmembers rescued 127 migrants in 8-foot (2.4 m) seas from a 40-foot (12 m), grossly overloaded Dominican yola. In June 2005 during a ten-day period, Confidence safely intercepted 162 Haitians from a 40-foot (12 m) vessel on the Great Bahama Bank, seven Cubans from a makeshift vessel sinking in the Old Bahama Channel and 111 Haitians in a 30-foot (9.1 m) vessel in 9-foot (2.7 m) seas north of Great Inagua, Bahamas.

During January 2007, Confidence returned to the Coast Guard Yard for her second major overhaul, the Mission Effectiveness Project. Mechanical systems were serviced and a new davit system was installed for her Over the Horizon rigid hull inflatable boat.

On 2 May, 2024 Confidence was removed from active duty and placed in commission, special status at a ceremony at Cape Canaveral. How long Confidence will be absent from active duty was unknown at that time. After sailing her to the Coast Guard Yard where she was launched 58 years ago, her crew departed Confidence for another Coast Guard cutter to help address the Coast Guard's shortage of enlisted personnel.

During her service, Confidence has been awarded the United States Secretary of Transportation’s Gold Medal for Outstanding Achievement, six Coast Guard Unit Commendations, five Coast Guard Meritorious Unit Commendations, three National Defense Service Medals, four Humanitarian Service Medals, and four Special Operations Ribbons. Following the ship’s 2007 Tailored Annual Cutter Training, Confidence earned her 10th consecutive Coast Guard Battle "E" Ribbon for Operational Excellence.
