= USCGC Venturous =

US Coast Guard vessel

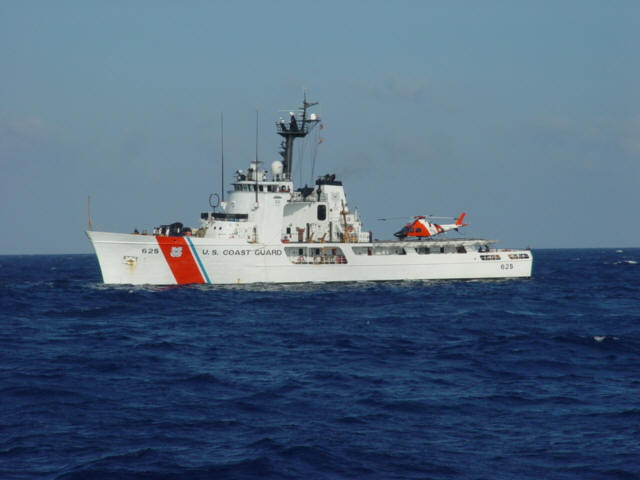
- USCGC Venturous (WMEC-625)

History

United States
- Name: Venturous
- Builder: American Ship Building Company, Lorain, Ohio
- Laid down: May 22, 1967
- Commissioned: September 12, 1968
- Home port: Portsmouth, Virginia
- Identification: MMSI number: 367877000; Callsign: NVES
- Motto: Nemo Supra; None Better
- Status: Active

General characteristics
- Class & type: Reliance-class cutter
- Displacement: 759 tons
- Length: 210 ft 6 in (64.16 m)
- Beam: 34 ft (10 m)
- Draft: 10 ft 6 in (3.20 m) max
- Propulsion: 2 x V16 2,550 hp (1,902 kW) ALCO diesel engines
- Speed: max 18 knots (33 km/h; 21 mph); 2,700-mile (4,350 km) range
- Range: cruise 14 knots (26 km/h; 16 mph); 6,100-mile (9,820 km) range
- Complement: 12 officers, 63 enlisted
- Sensors & processing systems: 2 x AN/SPS-64
- Armament: 1 × Mk 38 25 mm machine gun; 2 × M2HB .50 caliber machine gun
- Aircraft carried: HH-65 Dolphin helicopter

USCGC Venturous (WMEC-625) is a United States Coast Guard medium endurance cutter. The vessel was constructed by the American Shipbuilding Company in Lorain, Ohio in 1967 and commissioned in 1968. The ship has served on both the west and eastern coasts of the United States. The vessel is used for search and rescue, fishery law enforcement, border enforcement and smuggling interdiction along the coasts and in the Caribbean Sea.

== Construction and career ==
The Venturous's motto is Nemo Supra, which means "None Better". Thirteenth of sixteen Reliance-class cutters, Venturous was built by the American Shipbuilding Company in Lorain, Ohio. Her keel was laid on May 22, 1967 and she was commissioned on September 12, 1968. Upon commissioning Venturous set sail for San Diego, California, and arrived November 23, 1968. Over the next 27 years Venturous changed her homeport several times, finally settling in Astoria, Oregon before being decommissioned at the United States Coast Guard Yard in Baltimore, Maryland on February 11, 1994, to undergo an 18-month Major Maintenance Availability. Upon recommissioning Venturous was reassigned to St. Petersburg, Florida. In 2026, the homeport of Venturous changed again, this time to Portsmouth, Virginia. She arrived on July 10.

Initially designed for search and rescue (SAR) efforts, Venturous participated in and led many SAR missions including the recovery of the abandoned sailboat Jazz Limited off the coast of Mexico, towing the disabled fishing vessel Crusader to San Diego, California, and towing the Moon Spinner to Pelican, Alaska. In 1970, Venturous responded to the sinking of the fuel tanker SS Connecticut. After hours of dewatering and plugging the tanker was towed safely to shore.

From June 1988 to May 1992, Venturous earned three Coast Guard Unit Commendations, excelling in Alaskan patrols, aiding in the Exxon Valdez oil spill cleanup and enforcing fisheries laws. In 1990 alone, Venturous seized four fishing vessels for violating Russian, Canadian, and U.S. fishing laws. In January 1999 Venturous' boarding team discovered 9,500 pounds (4,300 kg) of cocaine aboard the MV Cannes, at the time the tenth largest seizures in U.S. history. The cutter was awarded the Coast Guard Foundation Award for operational achievements in the fields of drug and migrant interdiction.

Subsequently Venturous has been involved in a cross-section of the Coast Guard missions, including the interdiction of 8,400 lb (3,800 kg) of cocaine and 3,200 lb (1,500 kg) of marijuana, the apprehension and repatriation of 950 illegal migrants attempting to entire south Florida and Puerto Rico and the apprehension of many smugglers responsible for these illegal ventures, the dramatic rescue of a woman adrift at sea for more than two days in the Mona Pass following the capsizing of the migrant vessel she was attempting to illegally enter the US aboard, and the delivery of 34,000 lb (15,000 kg) of humanitarian supplies to Santo Domingo, the capital of the Dominican Republic (DR) to assist victims of flooding in that country and eastern Haiti.

Venturous participated in Hurricane Maria relief in the Caribbean. On September 30, 2017, the cutter docked in Vieques, Puerto Rico to deliver fuel and water to the island. She delivered a total of 3,000 US gallons (11,000 L; 2,500 imp gal) of water, 3,800 US gallons (14,000 L; 3,200 imp gal) of diesel fuel and ice to the local community. She returned to Vieques again on October 7, 2017 where the Venturous crew delivered approximately 30,000 pounds of food and water. In all, the Venturous crew distributed more than 150,000 pounds of aid to five coastal cities in Puerto Rico during the response.
