= Medium endurance cutter =

Type of cutter in the U.S. Coast Guard

The Medium Endurance Cutter or WMEC is a type of United States Coast Guard Cutter mainly consisting of the 270-foot (82 m) Famous- and 210-foot (64 m) Reliance-class cutters. These larger cutters are under control of Area Commands (Atlantic Area or Pacific Area). These cutters have adequate accommodations for crew to live on board and can do 6 to 8 week patrols.

Other ships in the WMEC classification are the 282-foot (86 m) USCGC Alex Haley, and the now-decommissioned 213-foot (65 m) USCGC Acushnet, and 230-foot (70 m) USCGC Storis, and 205-foot (62 m) USCGC Tamaroa which began as the United States Navy Cherokee-class fleet tug USS Zuni launched in 1943.

There are 13 vessels in the Famous class, and 12 vessels still in active US service in the Reliance class. The Coast Guard plans to eventually phase out the vessels in both of these cutter classes and replace them with the Offshore Patrol Cutter as part of the Integrated Deepwater System Program.

== History ==
After World War II, the United States Coast Guard used the US Navy hull classification system. The large, sea-going cutters were classified primarily as Coast Guard gunboats (WPG), destroyer escorts (WDE), and seaplane tenders (WAVP). In 1965 the Coast Guard adopted its own designation system and these large cutters were then referred to as Coast Guard High Endurance Cutters (WHEC). The coastal cutters once known as Cruising Cutters, Second Class and then as Coast Guard patrol craft (WPC) were now Coast Guard Medium Endurance Cutters (WMEC)."

== Famous-class cutter ==
Famous class
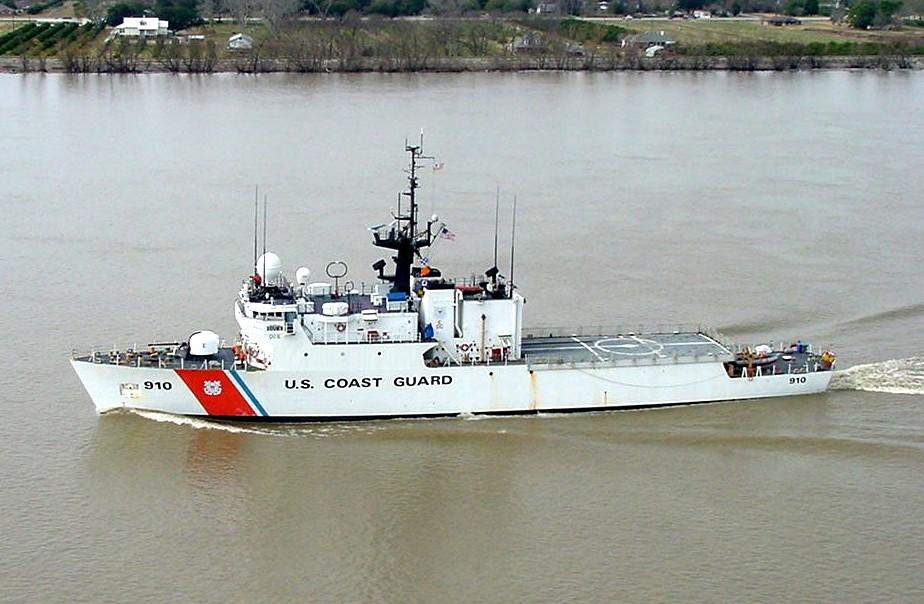
- Famous-class cutter USCGC Thetis (WMEC-910)

Class overview
- Builders: Robert Derecktor Shipyard Inc., Middletown, Rhode Island; Tacoma Boatbuilding Company, Tacoma, Washington
- Operators: United States Coast Guard
- Built: 1979–1989
- In commission: 1983–present
- Completed: 13
- Active: 13

General characteristics
- Displacement: 1,800 long tons (1,829 t)
- Length: 270 ft (82 m)
- Beam: 38 ft (12 m)
- Draft: 14 ft 5 in (4.39 m)
- Installed power: 2 × Caterpillar V12 diesel generators
- Propulsion: 2 × turbo-charged ALCO V-18 diesel engines; 2 × 9-foot-diameter (2.7 m) controllable pitch propellers
- Speed: 19.5 knots (36.1 km/h; 22.4 mph)
- Range: 9,900 nmi (18,300 km; 11,400 mi)
- Complement: 100 (14 officers, 86 enlisted)
- Sensors & processing systems: FCS MK 92 Mod 1; SPS-78 Surface Search Radar
- Electronic warfare & decoys: AN/SLQ-32A(V)2 2 x Mark 36 SRBOC
- Armament: 1 × OTO Melara Mark 75 76 mm/62 caliber naval gun; 2 × .50 caliber (12.7 mm) machine guns
- Aviation facilities: Helipad and hangar for HH-65 Dolphin or HH-60J Jayhawk

The Famous-class vessels have hull numbers in the range from WMEC-901 through WMEC-913. Entering service in the 1980s, the Famous-class cutters were designed as replacements for the 327-foot (100 m) Treasury-class cutters, and their mission profile emphasized law enforcement, particularly patrolling the newly established 200-nautical-mile (370 km; 230 mi) exclusive economic zone.

The Coast Guard harvested weapons systems components from decommissioned Oliver Hazard Perry-class frigates to save money. Harvesting components from four decommissioned frigates resulted in more than $24 million in cost savings, which increased with parts from more decommissioned frigates. Equipment such as the Mark 75, 76 mm/62 caliber gun mounts, gun control panels, barrels, launchers, junction boxes, and other components from decommissioned Oliver Hazard Perry-class frigates were returned to service aboard Famous-class cutters in order to extend their service lives into the 2030s.

=== Ships in class ===
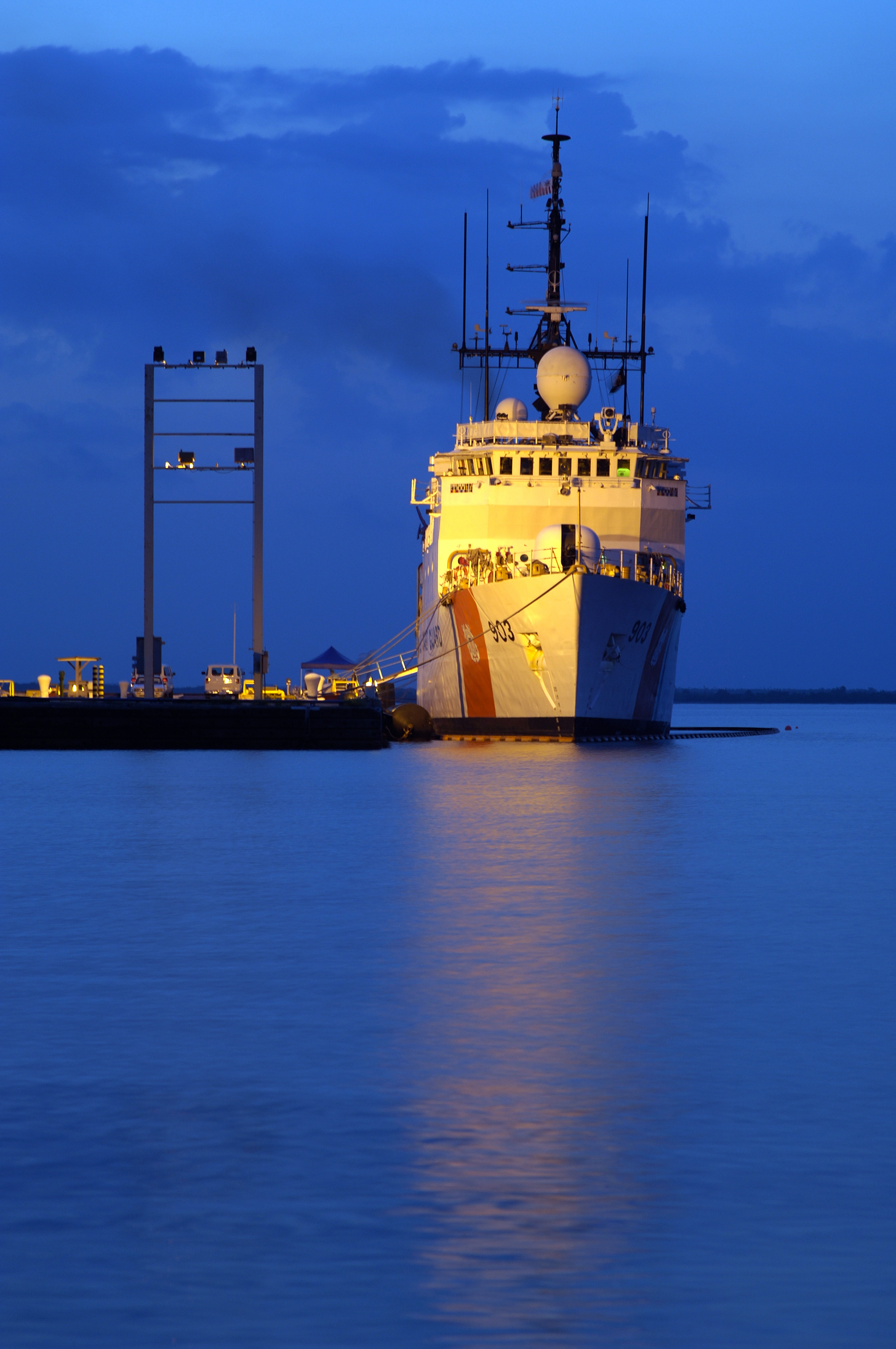
USCGC Harriet Lane moored at Guantanamo Bay Naval Base.

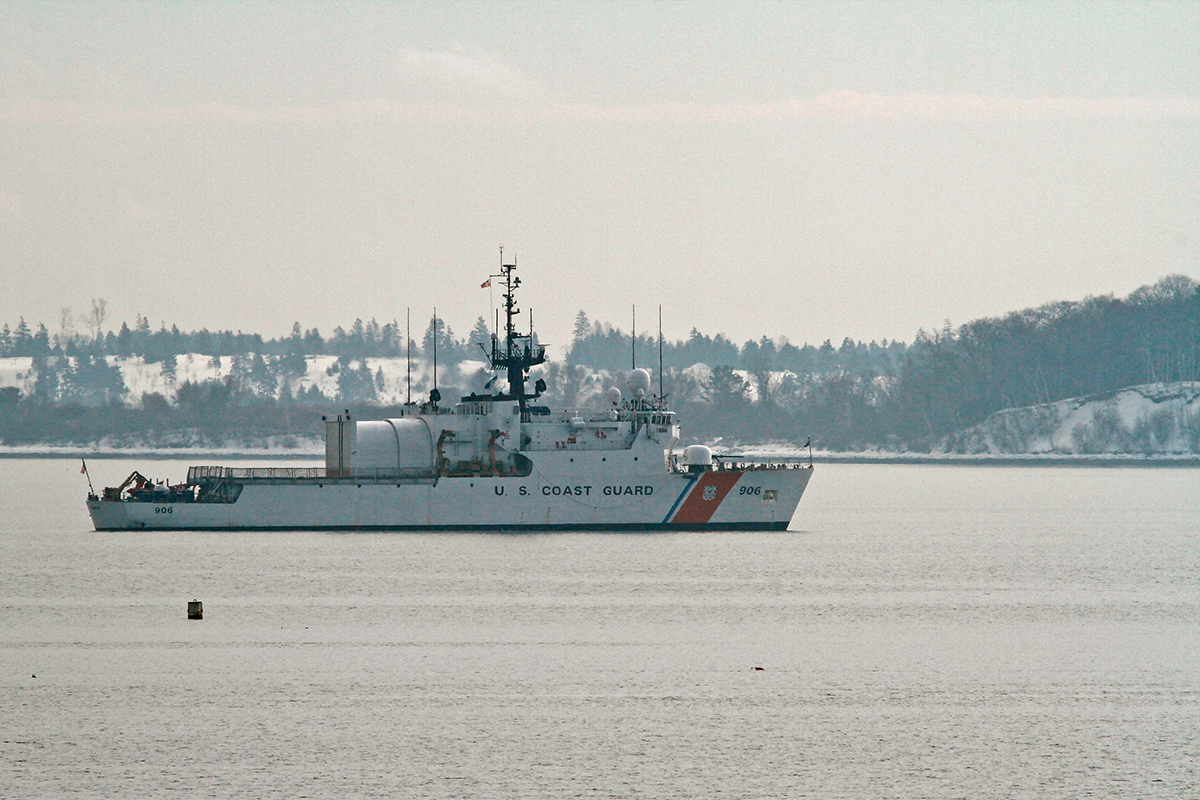
The cutter USCGC Seneca in the Casco Bay in Falmouth, Maine. Chebeague and Little Chebeague Island are behind her.

Famous class
Hull number	Name	Commissioned	Status
WMEC-901	Bear	February 4, 1983	Active
WMEC-902	Tampa	March 16, 1984	Active
WMEC-903	Harriet Lane	September 20, 1984	Active
WMEC-904	Northland	December 17, 1984	Active
WMEC-905	Spencer	June 28, 1986	Active
WMEC-906	Seneca	May 4, 1987	Active
WMEC-907	Escanaba	August 27, 1987	Active
WMEC-908	Tahoma	April 6, 1988	Active
WMEC-909	Campbell	August 19, 1988	Active
WMEC-910	Thetis	June 30, 1989	Active
WMEC-911	Forward	August 4, 1990	Active
WMEC-912	Legare	August 4, 1990	Active
WMEC-913	Mohawk	March 20, 1991	Active

=== Service life extension program ===
The service life extension program (SLEP) for eight cutters of the class started in July 2021 with prototype work for electrical and structural systems on the Seneca and Harriet Lane. Additionally, Harriet Lane served as the prototype for the replacement of the main gun with a Mk38 Mod 3 25mm machine gun. The production phase of the SLEP, which will be carried out on Spencer, Legare, Campbell, Forward, Escanaba and Tahoma, covers four main areas: the electrical, structural and weapons systems work prototyped on Seneca and Harriet Lane and finally replacement of the main propulsion Diesel engines. The last SLEP is expected to be complete by 2030.

SLEP status
Hull number	Name	Entered SLEP	Departed SLEP
WMEC-906	Seneca	July 2021	April 4, 2022
WMEC-903	Harriet Lane	March 28, 2022	August 3, 2023
WMEC-905	Spencer	July 1, 2023	March 8, 2025
WMEC-912	Legare	June 24, 2024	
WMEC-909	Campbell		
WMEC-911	Forward		
WMEC-907	Escanaba		
WMEC-908	Tahoma		

== Reliance-class cutter ==
Reliance class
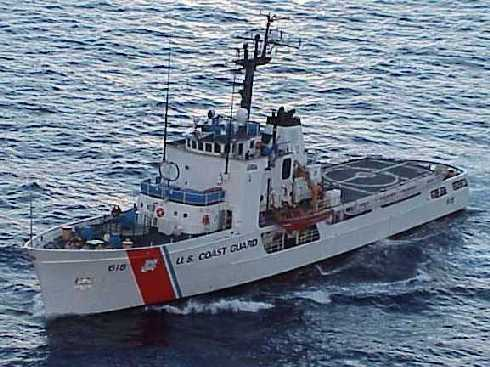
- Cutter USCGC Reliance

Class overview
- Builders: Todd Shipyards, Houston, Texas; American Ship Building Company, Lorain, Ohio; U.S. Coast Guard Yard, Curtis Bay, Maryland; Christy Corporation, Sturgeon Bay, Wisconsin
- Operators: United States Coast Guard; Sri Lanka Navy; Colombian Navy / Coast Guard; Malaysian Maritime Enforcement Agency
- Built: 1962–1968
- In commission: 1964–present
- Completed: 16
- Active: 12

General characteristics
- Displacement: 1,127.2 long tons (1,145 t) full load
- Length: 210 ft 6 in (64.16 m) LOA; 200 ft (61 m) LWL
- Beam: 34 ft (10 m)
- Draft: 10 ft 9 in (3.28 m)
- Propulsion: 2 × 2,500 hp (1,864 kW) ALCO 251B diesel engines
- Speed: 18 knots (33 km/h; 21 mph)
- Range: 8,000 nmi (15,000 km; 9,200 mi) at 12 knots (22 km/h; 14 mph)
- Complement: 75
- Armament: 1 × 25mm Mk 38 autocannon; 2 × M2HB .50 caliber (12.7mm) machine guns
- Aviation facilities: Helipad

The Reliance-class vessels have hull numbers in the range from WMEC-615 through WMEC-630. Entering service between 1964 and 1969, the Reliance-class cutters were meant to replace the 125-foot (38 m) cutters of the Prohibition era and were the first major cutter replacement project since the 255-foot (78 m) Owasco-class cutters from World War II.

The 210s (210-foot cutters) received upgrades and modifications (in a program named "Midlife Maintenance Availability" or MMA) during the 1986 through 1990 time period. The "A"-class cutters had their gas turbines removed, and all 210s had their stern transom exhaust systems replaced with a traditional stack. While this modification reduced the size of the flight deck, they were still more than capable of carrying out helicopter operations. Other modifications included enlarging the superstructure area, replacing the main armament, and increasing the fire-fighting capability of the cutters. The modifications cost approximately $20 million per cutter, well above their original cost of about $3.5 million each.

=== Ships in class ===
Reliance class
Hull number	Name	Status
WMEC-615	Reliance	Active
WMEC-616	Diligence	Active
WMEC-617	Vigilant	Active
WMEC-618	Active	Active
WMEC-619	Confidence	In commission, special status
WMEC-620	Resolute	Active
WMEC-621	Valiant	In commission, special status
WMEC-622	Courageous	Decommissioned, transferred to Sri Lanka Navy
WMEC-623	Steadfast	Decommissioned, transferred to Malaysian Maritime Enforcement Agency
WMEC-624	Dauntless	In commission, special status
WMEC-625	Venturous	Active
WMEC-626	Dependable	In commission, special status
WMEC-627	Vigorous	Active
WMEC-628	Durable	Decommissioned and transferred to Colombia
WMEC-629	Decisive	Decommissioned, will transfer to Sri Lanka Navy
WMEC-630	Alert	Active

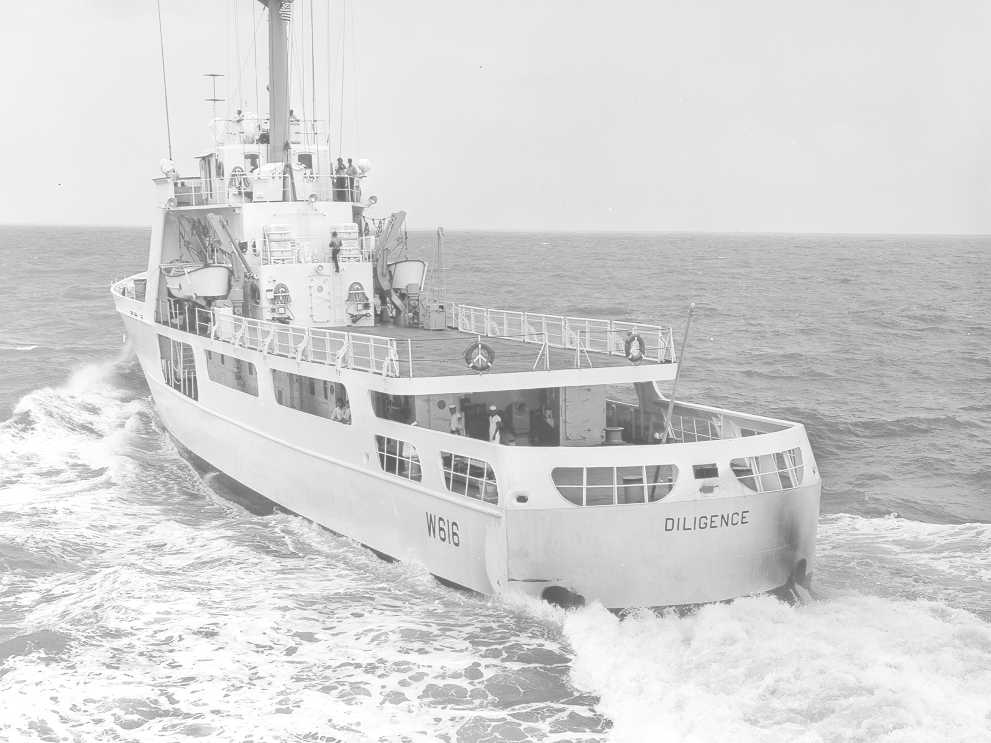
USCGC Diligence (WMEC-616) in 1965. Note the lack of exhaust stacks and the exhaust ports at the waterline on the transom on the original design. Reliance class cutters would have stacks added during future overhauls.

USCGC Valiant (WMEC-621) was removed from active service and placed in commission, special status on 17 June 2025.

USCGC Courageous (WMEC 622) was decommissioned on 19 September 2001. She was transferred to the government of Sri Lanka on 24 June 2004 as SLNS Samudura (P-621).

USCGC Steadfast (WMEC-623) was decommissioned on 1 February 2024 and transferred to the Malaysian Maritime Enforcement Agency.

USCGC Dauntless (WMEC-624) was removed from active service and placed in commission, special status on 21 June 2024. As of that date she had served 56 years. She and Steadfast are the only two Coast Guard cutters to have seized one million pounds of marijuana.

USCGC Dependable (WMEC-626) was removed from active service and placed in commission, special status on 9 April 2024. Her crew were transferred to other Coast Guard units to help meet the service-wide shortage of enlisted personnel.

USCGC Durable (WMEC-628) was decommissioned on 20 September 2001. In 2003 she was transferred to the Coast Guard of the Colombian Navy as ARC Valle del Cauca (PO-44).

USCGC Decisive (WMEC-629) was decommissioned on 2 March 2023.
