= List of United States Coast Guard units (2019) =

The following January 2019 order of battle is for the United States Coast Guard.

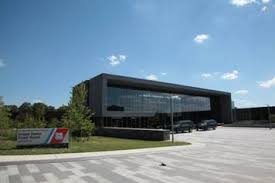
Douglas A. Munro Coast Guard Headquarters Building in St. Elizabeths West Campus.

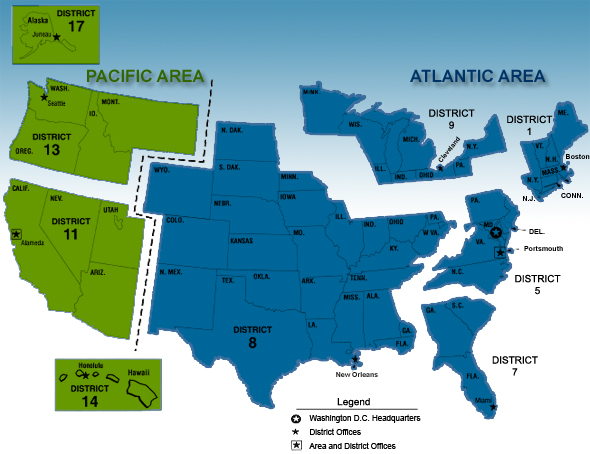
Map of USCG Districts

The headquarters of the Coast Guard is located at 2703 Martin Luther King Jr Avenue SE in Washington, D.C. The Coast Guard relocated to the grounds of the former St. Elizabeths Hospital in 2013.

The Coast Guard is divided into two area commands, the Atlantic Area and the Pacific Area, each of which is commanded by a vice admiral, with each being designated Maritime Homeland Defense Areas. Each includes various district commands.

The Coast Guard is further organized into nine districts, commanded by a District Commander, a rear admiral, with each responsible for a portion of the nation's coastline.

There are three major operational commands located outside the United States:

- USCG Far East Activities (FEACT) is located at Yokota Air Base, Japan. FEACT also commands Port Security Unit’s which deploy to South Korea, helping to support U.S. Naval Forces Korea. FEACT helps inspects U.S. ships overseas and foreign ships that will be operating in the Pacific. FEACT helps by providing Maritime Safety, Security, Training and International Support.

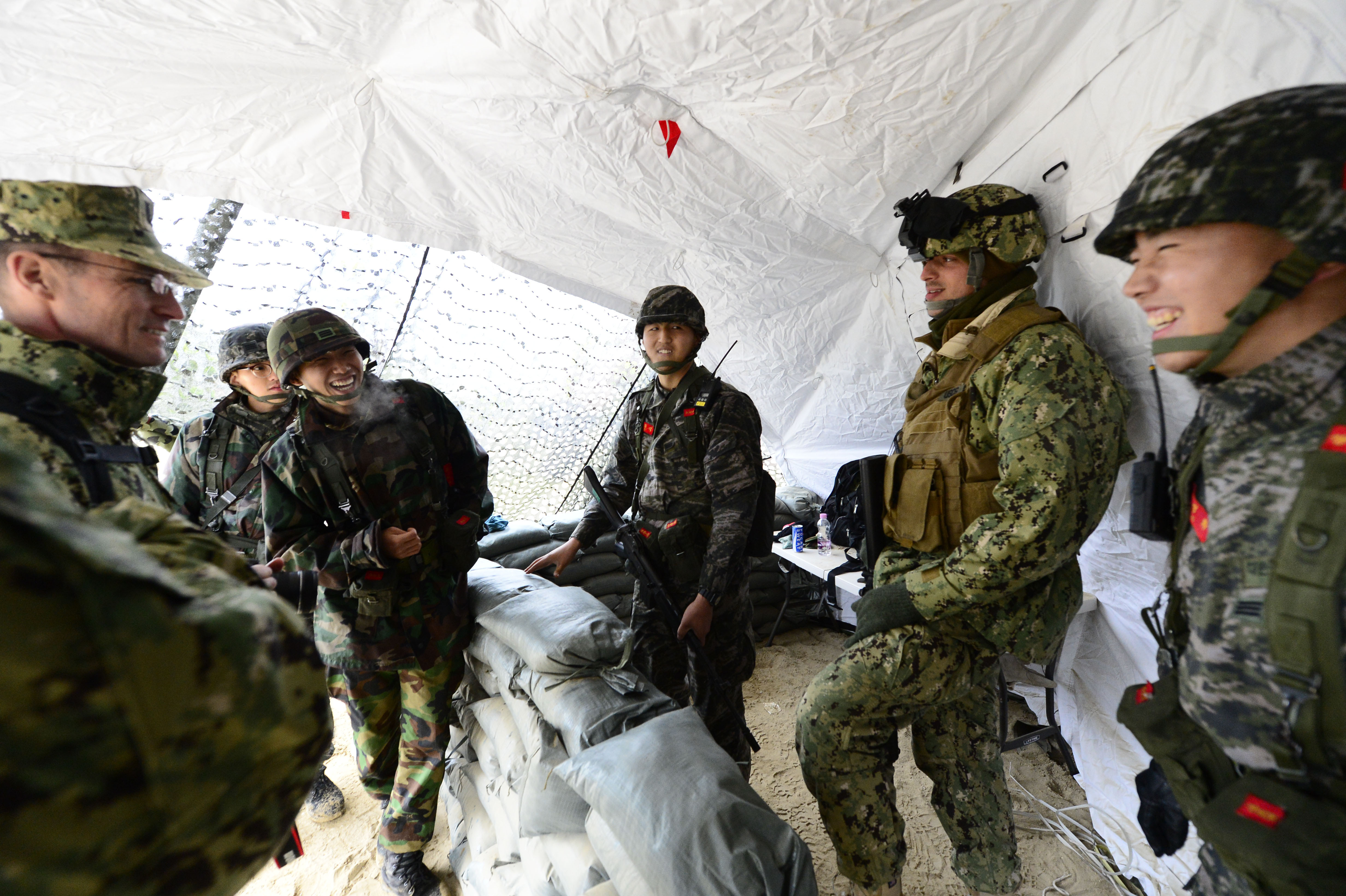
Port Security Unit (PSU) 313 in Pohang, South Korea

- USCG Activities Europe (ACTEUR) is located in Schinnen, Netherlands.
- Patrol Forces Southwest Asia (PATFORSWA) is based out of Manama, Bahrain. Established in 2002, the mission of PATFORSWA is to train, organize, equip, support and deploy combat-ready Coast Guard forces in support of CENTCOM and national security objectives.

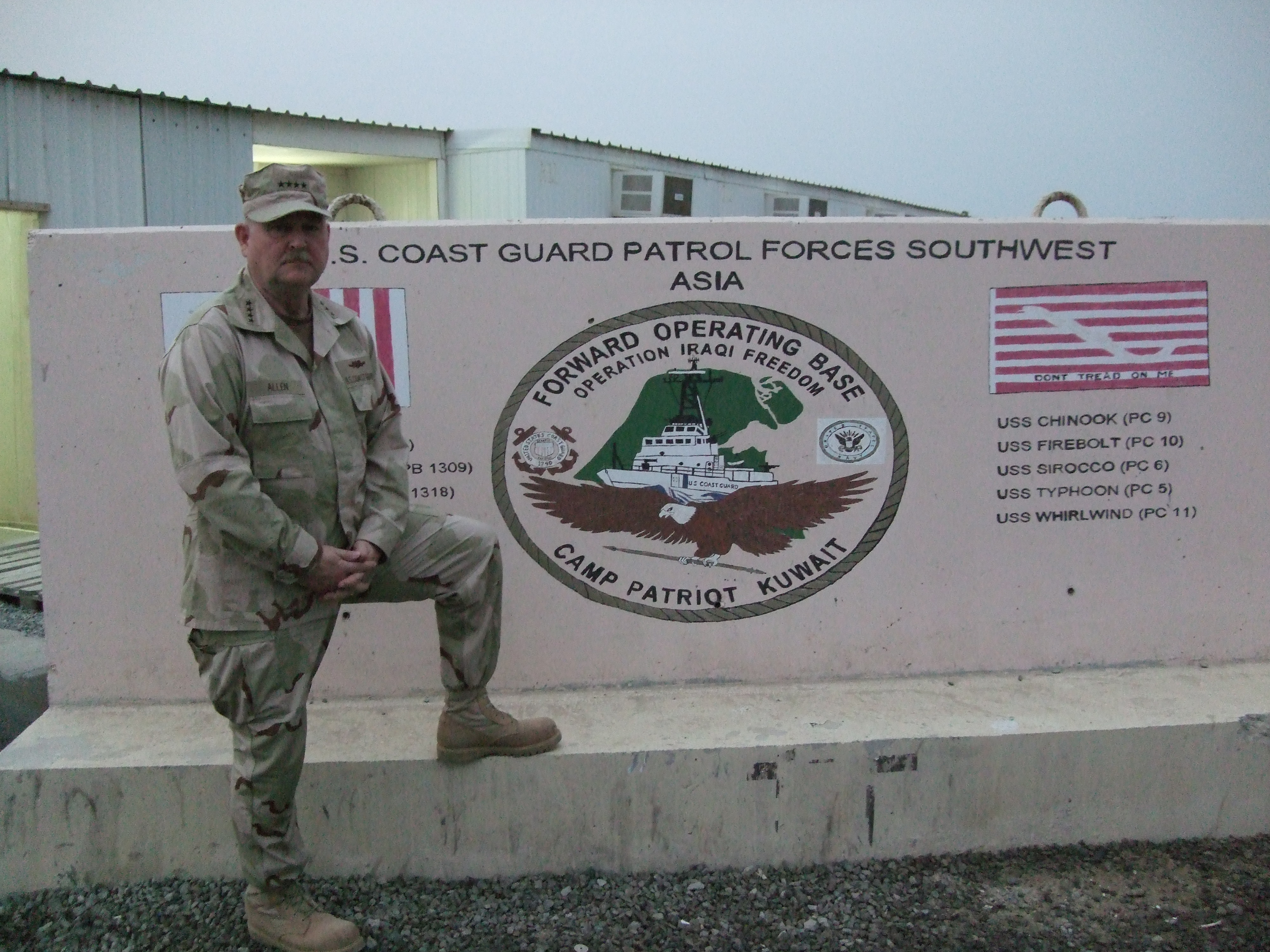
FOB PATFORSWA - KNB (Kuwait Naval Base)

Various shore establishment commands exist to support and facilitate the mission of the sea and air assets and report directly to the U.S. Coast Guard Headquarters is located in Southeast Washington, D.C.

== Headquarters Support Units ==
=== Deputy Commandant for Operations ===
The Deputy Commandant for Operations (DCO) is charged with developing and overseeing the execution of operational planning, policy, and international engagement at the strategic level The DCO is led by a Vice Admiral and is located at the USCG headquarters in Washington, D.C.

- National Command Center is tasked with maintaining situational awareness, current operations information and command centers for all USCG operations worldwide and support of Department of Homeland Security, federal, state and local authorities. It is a 24-hour operation located at the USCG headquarters in Washington, D.C., and led by a Rear Admiral.
- Assistant Commandant for Prevention Policy is tasked with developing and maintaining policy, standards and regulations pertaining to marine safety and security. It is located at the USCG headquarters in Washington, D.C., and is led by a Rear Admiral.
  - United States Coast Guard Marine Safety Center verifies compliance of technical standards for the design, construction, alteration and repair of commercial vessels. It's located in Washington, D.C., and led by a Captain.
  - National Maritime Center performs training, accreditation, and certification of mariners and United States Merchant Marine sailors. It's located in Martinsburg, West Virginia, and led by a Captain.
  - *United States Coast Guard Navigation Center is tasked with ensuring safe navigation of U.S. waterways and civil GPS operations for waterway navigation. It's located in Alexandria, Virginia, and led by a Captain.
    - Communications Station Boston, Massachusetts
    - Communications Station Honolulu, Hawaii
    - Communication Station Kodiak, Alaska
    - Communications Station Miami, Florida
    - Communications Station New Orleans, Louisiana
  - National Data Buoy Center
  - National Vessel Documentation Centerlocated in Falling Waters, West Virginia, provides a register of vessels available in time of war or emergency to defend and protect the United States of America.
  - United States Coast Guard Marine Safety Laboratories located in New London, Connecticut, provides forensic oil analysis and expert testimony in support of the oil pollution law enforcement.
- Assistant Commandant for Response Policy is responsible for developing and promoting policies for all Coast Guard forces to effectively accomplish operational maritime missions. It's located in Washington, D.C., and led by a Rear Admiral.
  - United States Coast Guard National Response Force serves as a nationwide emergency call center that fields INITIAL reports for pollution and railroad incidents and forwards that information to appropriate federal/state agencies for response, similar to that of a 911 dispatch center. It's located Washington, D.C., and commanded by a Captain.
- Assistant Commandant for Capability is responsible for identifying and providing capabilities and standards in order to meet USCG mission requirements. Located in Washington, D.C., and led by a Rear Admiral.
  - Office of Cyberspace Forces is responsible for cyber capabilities and capacity to meet USCG mission requirements. It is also located in Washington, D.C., and led by a Captain.

=== Deputy Commandant for Mission Support ===
. The Deputy Commandant for Mission Support (DCMS) is responsible for all facets of mission support and life-cycle management of USCG assets. It is located alongside the USCGC headquarters in Washington, D.C., and is led by a Vice Admiral.

- United States Coast Guard Academy
  - USCGC Eagle (WIX-327)
- Director of Operational Logistics
  - Coast Guard Base Alameda
  - Coast Guard Base Boston
  - Coast Guard Base Cape Cod
  - Coast Guard Base Cleveland
  - Coast Guard Base Elizabeth City
  - Coast Guard Base Honolulu
  - Coast Guard Base Ketchikan
  - Coast Guard Base Kodiak
  - Coast Guard Base Los Angeles-Long Beach
  - Coast Guard Base Miami Beach
  - Coast Guard Base National Capital Region
  - Coast Guard Base New Orleans
  - Coast Guard Base Portsmouth
  - Coast Guard Base Seattle
- Fleet Readiness Command
  - United States Coast Guard Training Center Cape May
  - Coast Guard Aviation Training Center
  - United States Coast Guard Aviation Technical Training Center
  - United States Coast Guard Leadership Development Center
  - Maritime Law Enforcement Academy
    - Gulf Regional Fisheries Training Center
    - Northeast Regional Fisheries Training Center
    - North Pacific Regional Fisheries Training Center
    - Southeast Regional Fisheries Training Center
    - Pacific Regional Fisheries Training Center
  - Joint Maritime Training Center
  - Training Center Petaluma
  - Training Center Yorktown
  - Force Readiness Command Training Division
    - Training Team East
    - Training Team West
  - National Motor Lifeboat School
  - Training Quota Management Center
  - Readiness, Standardization and Assessment Branch
  - Exercise Support Detachment Alameda
  - Exercise Support Detachment Portsmouth
  - Exercise Support Detachment Washington
  - Finance/Admin Assessment Section
  - Food Service Advisory Team East
  - Food Service Advisory Team West
  - Container Inspection Training and Assist Team
  - Armory Alameda
  - Armory Cape Canaveral
  - Armory Cape Cod
  - Armory New Orleans
  - Armory Port Clinton
  - Armory Seattle
  - Armory Terminal Island
- Assistant Commandant for Human Resources
  - Personnel Service Center
  - Pay and Personnel Center
  - Community Services Command
- Assistant Commandant for Engineering and Logistics
  - Aviation Logistics Center
  - Surface Force Logistics Center
  - Shore Infrastructure Logistics Center
    - Civil Engineering Unit Cleveland
    - Civil Engineering Unit Juneau
    - Civil Engineering Unit Miami
    - Civil Engineering Unit Providence
    - Civil Engineering Unit Honolulu
    - Civil Engineering Unit Oakland
- Assistant Commandant for Command, Control, Communication, Computers and Information Technology (C4&IT)
  - C4IT Service Center
  - Operations Systems Center
- Assistant Commandant for Acquisitions
  - United States Coast Guard Research & Development Center
- United States Coast Guard Intelligence Coordination Center; Coast Guard Intelligence

=== Headquarters direct report units ===
- United States Coast Guard Legal Division
- United States Coast Guard Office of Public Affairs
- Helicopter Interdiction Tactical Squadron
- Coast Guard Air Station Washington
- National Pollution Funds Center

== Atlantic Area ==
=== Northeast District ===
- Sector Boston
  - Base Boston
    - Aids to Navigation Team Boston
  - Station Gloucester
  - Station Merrimack River
  - Station Port Allerton
  - USCGC Key Largo (WPB-1324)
  - USCGC Reef Shark (WPB-87371)
  - USCGC Pendant (WYTL-65608)
- Sector Long Island Sound
  - Station Eatons Neck
  - Station Fire Island
  - Station Jones Beach
  - Station Montauk
  - Station New Haven
    - Aids to Navigation Team Long Island Sound
  - Station New London
  - Station Shinnecock
  - Aids to Navigation Team Moriches
  - Marine Safety Detachment Coram
  - USCGC Albacore (WPB-87309)
  - USCGC Bonito (WPB-87341)
  - USCGC Bollard (WYTL-65614)
- Sector New York
  - Station Kings Point
  - Station New York
    - Aids to Navigation Team New York
  - Station Sandy Hook
  - Aids to Navigation Team Saugerties
  - USCGC Sitkinak
  - USCGC Shrike (WPB-87342)
  - USCGC Sailfish (WPB-87356)
  - USCGC Penobscot Bay (WTGB-107)
  - USCGC Sturgeon Bay (WTGB-109)
  - USCGC Hawser (WYTL-65610)
  - USCGC Line (WYTL-65611)
  - USCGC Wire (WYTL-65612)
- Sector Northern New England
  - Station Portsmouth Harbor
    - Marine Safety Detachment Portsmouth
  - Station Burlington
  - Station Boothbay Harbor
  - Station Eastport
  - Station Jonesport
  - Station Rockland
  - Station South Portland
    - Aids to Navigation Team South Portland
  - Aids to Navigation Team Southwest Harbor
  - Marine Safety Detachment Belfast
  - USCGC Ocracoke (WPB-1307)
  - USCGC Amberjack (WPB-87315)
  - USCGC Thunder Bay (WTGB-108)
  - USCGC Tackle (WYTL-65605)
  - USCGC Bridle (WYTL-65607)
  - USCGC Shackle (WYTL-65609)
- Sector Southeastern New England
  - Station Block Island
  - Station Brant Point
  - Station Cape Cod Canal
  - Station Castle Hill
  - Station Chatham
  - Station Menemsha
  - Station Point Judith
  - Station Provincetown
  - Station Woods Hole
    - Aids to Navigation Team Woods Hole
  - Aids to Navigation Team Bristol
  - Marine Safety Detachment Cape Cod
  - Marine Safety Detachment New Bedford
  - USCGC Sanibel (WPB-1312)
  - USCGC Tybee (WPB-1330)
  - USCGC Hammerhead (WPB-87302)
  - USCGC Steelhead (WPB-87324)
  - USCGC Tiger Shark (WPB-87359)
- District controlled units and cutters
  - Coast Guard Air Station Cape Cod
  - USCGC Juniper (WLB-201)
  - USCGC Oak (WLB-211)
  - USCGC Ida Lewis (WLM-551)
  - USCGC Katherine Walker (WLM-552)
  - USCGC Abbie Burgess (WLM-553)
  - USCGC Marcus Hanna (WLM-554)

=== East District ===
- Sector Maryland-National Capital Region
  - Station Annapolis
  - Station Crisfield
    - Aids to Navigation Team Crisfield
  - Station Curtis Bay
  - Station Ocean City
  - Station Oxford
  - Station St. Inigoes
  - Station Washington
  - Aids to Navigation Team Baltimore
  - Aids to Navigation Team Potomac
  - USCGC Chock (WYTL-65602)
- Sector Delaware Bay
  - Station Atlantic City
  - Station Barnegat Light
  - Station Cape May
    - Aids to Navigation Team Cape May
  - Station Indian River
  - Station Manasquan Inlet
  - Station Philadelphia
    - Aids to Navigation Team Philadelphia
  - Marine Safety Detachment Lewes
  - USCGC Mako (WPB-87303)
  - USCGC Ibis (WPB-87338)
  - USCGC Crocodile (WPB-97369)
  - USCGC Rollin A. Fritch (WPC-1119)
  - USCGC Lawrence O. Lawson (WPC-1120)
  - USCGC Capstan (WYTL-65601)
  - USCGC Cleat (WYTL-65615)
- Sector Virginia
  - Base Portsmouth
  - Station Cape Charles
  - Station Chincoteague
    - Aids to Navigation Team Chincoteague
  - Station Little Creek
  - Station Milford Haven
    - Aids to Navigation Team Milford Haven
  - Station Wacapreague
  - Aids to Navigation Team Hampton Roads
  - USCGC Cochito (WPB-87329)
  - USCGC Heron (WPB-87344)
  - USCGC Flying Fish (WPB-87346)
  - USCGC Shearwater (WPB-87349)
  - USCGC Sea Horse (WPB-87361)
- Sector North Carolina
  - Station Elizabeth City
  - Station Emerald Isle
  - Station Fort Macon
    - Aids to Navigation Team Fort Macon
  - Station Hatteras Island
  - Station Hobucken
  - Station Oak Island
    - Aids to Navigation Team Oak Island
  - Station Oregon Inlet
  - Station Wrightsville Beach
  - Aids to Navigation Team Wanchese
  - USCGC Bayberry (WLI-65400)
  - USCGC Richard Snyder (WPC-1127)
  - USCGC Nathan Bruckenthal (WPC-1128)
- District controlled units and Cutters
  - Coast Guard Air Station Atlantic City
  - Coast Guard Air Station Elizabeth City
  - USCGC Maple (WLB-207)
  - USCGC Smilax (WLIC-315)
  - USCGC Kennebec (WLIC-802)
  - USCGC Sledge (WLIC-75303)
  - USCGC James Rankin (WLM-555)
  - USCGC Frank Drew (WLM-557)
  - USCGC William Tate (WLM-560)

=== Southeast District ===
- Sector Charleston
  - Station Brunswick
  - Station Charleston
    - Aids to Navigation Team Charleston
  - Station Georgetown
    - Aids to Navigation Team Georgetown
  - Station Tybee Island
    - Aids to Navigation Team Tybee Island
  - Marine Safety Unit Savannah
  - USCGC Anvil (WLIC-75301)
  - USCGC Chinook (WPB-87308)
  - USCGC Cormorant (WPB-87313)
- Sector Jacksonville
  - Station Mayport
  - Station Ponce de Leon
    - Aids to Navigation Team Ponce de Leon
  - Station Cape Canaveral
    - Marine Safety Detachment Port Canaveral
  - Aids to Navigation Team Jacksonville Beach
  - USCGC Hammer (WLIC-75302)
  - USCGC Ridley (WPB-87328)
  - USCGC Moray (WPB-87331)
  - USCGC Maria Bray (WLM-562)
- Sector Key West
  - Station Key West
    - Aids to Navigation Team Key West
  - Station Islamoranda
  - Station Marathon
  - USCGC Charles David Jr. (WPC-1107)
  - USCGC Charles Sexton (WPC-1108)
  - USCGC Kathleen Moore (WPC-1109)
  - USCGC Raymond Evans (WPC-1110)
  - USCGC William Trump (WPC-1111)
  - USCGC Isaac Mayo (WPC-1112)
- Sector Miami
  - Station Miami Beach
  - Station Fort Pierce
    - Aids to Navigation Team Fort Pierce
  - Station Fort Lauderdale
    - Aids to Navigation Team Fort Lauderdale
  - Station Lake Worth Inlet
  - Marine Safety Detachment Lake Worth
  - USCGC Hudson (WLIC-801)
  - USCGC Finback (WPB-87314)
  - USCGC Bluefin (WPB-87318)
  - USCGC Gannet (WPB-87334)
  - USCGC Dolphin (WPB-87354)
  - USCGC Bernard C. Webber (WPC-1101)
  - USCGC Richard Etheridge (WPC-1102)
  - USCGC William Flores (WPC-1103)
  - USCGC Robert Yered (WPC-1104)
  - USCGC Margaret Norvell (WPC-1105)
  - USCGC Paul Clark (WPC-1106)
- Sector San Juan
  - Station San Juan
    - Aids to Navigation Team San Juan
  - Marine Safety Detachment St. Thomas
  - USCGC Yellowfin (WPB-87319)
  - USCGC Richard Dixon (WPC-1113)
  - USCGC Heriberto Hernandez (WPC-1114)
  - USCGC Joseph Napier (WPC-1115)
  - USCGC Winslow W. Griesser (WPC-1116)
  - USCGC Donald Horsley (WPC-1117)
  - USCGC Joseph Tezanos (WPC-1118)
- Sector St. Petersburg
  - Station St. Petersburg
    - Aids to Navigation Team St. Petersburg
  - Station Sand Key
  - Station Fort Myers Beach
  - Station Yankeetown
  - Station Cortez
  - USCGC Vise (WLIC-75305)
  - USCGC Joshua Appleby (WLM-556)
  - USCGC Marlin (WPB-87304)
  - USCGC Tarpon (WPB-87304)
  - USCGC Seahawk (WPB-87323)
  - USCGC Pelican (WPB-87327)
  - USCGC Hawk (WPB-87355)
  - USCGC Diamondback (WPB-87370)
- District controlled units and cutters
  - Coast Guard Air Station Borinquen
  - Coast Guard Air Station Clearwater
  - Coast Guard Air Station Miami
  - Coast Guard Air Station Savannah
    - Air Facility Charleston
  - Operation Bahamas, Turks and Caicos
  - Maritime Force Protection Unit-Kings Bay
    - USCGC Sea Dragon (WPB-87367)
    - USCGC Sea Dog (WPB-87373)
  - USCGC Willow (WLB-202)

=== Heartland District ===
- Sector Corpus Christi
  - Station Port Aranas
  - Station Port O'Conner
    - Aids to Navigation Team Port O'Connor
  - Station South Padre Island
    - Aids to Navigation Team South Padre Island
  - Aids to Navigation Team Corpus Christi
  - Marine Safety Detachment Brownsville
  - Marine Safety Detachment Victoria
  - USCGC Mallet (WLIC-75304)
  - USCGC Coho (WPB-87321)
  - USCGC Sturgeon (WPB-87336)
  - USCGC Alligator (WPB-87372)
- Sector Houston-Galveston
  - Station Freeport
  - Station Galveston
    - Aids to Navigation Team Galveston
  - Station Houston
  - Station Lake Charles
    - Marine Safety Unit Lake Charles
  - Station Sabine Pass
    - Aids to Navigation Team Sabine
  - Marine Safety Unit Port Arthur
  - Marine Safety Unit Texas City
  - USCGC Clamp (WLIC-75306)
  - USCGC Hatchet (WLIC-75309)
  - USCGC Manta (WPB-87320)
  - USCGC Beluga (WPB-87325)
  - USCGC Manowar (WPB-87330)
  - USCGC Pompano (WPB-87339)
- Sector Lower Mississippi
  - Aids to Navigation Team Colfax
  - Marine Safety Detachment Vicksburg
  - USCGC Muskingum (WLR-75402)
  - USCGC Kickapoo (WLR-75406)
  - USCGC Kanawha (WLR-75407)
  - USCGC Patoka (WLR-75408)
  - USCGC Kankakee (WLR-75500)
  - USCGC Greenbrier (WLR-75501)
- Sector Mobile
  - Station Dauphin Island
  - Station Destin
  - Station Gulfport
    - Aids to Navigation Team Gulfport
  - Station Panama City
  - Aids to Navigation Team Panama City
  - Marine Safety Detachment Panama City
  - Station Pascagoula
  - Station Pensacola
    - Aids to Navigation Team Pensacola
  - Aids to Navigation Team Eufaula
  - Aids to Navigation Team Mobile
  - USCGC Saginaw (WLIC-803)
  - USCGC Wedge (WLR-75307)
  - USCGC Stingray (WPB-87305)
  - USCGC Cobia (WPB-87311)
  - USCGC Kingfisher (WPB-87322)
- Sector New Orleans
  - Station Grand Isle
  - Station New Orleans
    - Aids to Navigation Team New Orleans
  - Station Venice
    - Aids to Navigation Team Venice
  - Aids to Navigation Team Dulac
  - Aids to Navigation Team Morgan City
  - Marine Safety Unit Baton Rouge
  - Marine Safety Unit Houma
  - Marine Safety Unit Morgan City
  - USCGC Pamlico (WLIC-800)
  - USCGC Axe (WLIC-75310)
  - USCGC Razorbill (WPB-87332)
  - USCGC Brant (WPB-87348)
  - USCGC Skipjack (WPB-87353)
- Sector Ohio Valley
  - Marine Safety Detachment Cincinnati
  - Marine Safety Detachment Nashville
  - Marine Safety Unit Huntington
  - Marine Safety Unit Paducah
  - Marine Safety Unit Pittsburg
  - USCGC Ouachita (WLR-65501)
  - USCGC Cimarron (WLR-65502)
  - USCGC Obion (WLR-65503)
  - USCGC Osage (WLR-65505)
  - USCGC Chippewa (WLR-75404)
  - USCGC Chena (WLR-75409)
- Sector Upper Mississippi River
  - Marine Safety Detachment St. Paul
  - Marine Safety Detachment Quad Cities
  - Marine Safety Detachment Peoria
  - USCGC Scioto (WLR-65504)
  - USCGC Sangamon (WLR-65506)
  - USCGC Gasconade (WLR-75401)
  - USCGC Wyaconda (WLR-75403)
  - USCGC Cheyenne (WLR-75405)
- District controlled units and cutters
  - Coast Guard Air Station New Orleans
  - Coast Guard Air Station Houston
  - Coast Guard Air Station Corpus Christi
  - USCGC Cypress (WLB-210)
  - USCGC Barbara Mabrity (WLM-559)
  - USCGC Harry Claiborne (WLM-561)
  - USCGC Benjamin B. Dailey (WPC-1123)
  - USCGC Jacob L.A. Paroo (WPC-1125)

=== Great Lakes District ===
- Sector Eastern Great Lakes (formerly Sector Buffalo)
  - Station Alexandria Bay
  - Station Buffalo
    - Aids to Navigation Team Buffalo
  - Station Cleveland Harbor
    - Marine Safety Unit Cleveland
  - Station Erie
  - Station Fairport
  - Station Niagara
  - Station Oswego
  - Station Rochester
  - Marine Safety Detachment Massena
- Sector Detroit
  - Station Belle Isle
  - Station Marblehead
  - Station Port Huron
  - Station Saginaw River
    - Aids to Navigation Team Saginaw River
  - Station St. Clair Shores
  - Station Tawas
  - Station Toledo
  - Marine Safety Unit Toledo
  - Aids to Navigation Team Detroit
- Sector Lake Michigan
  - Station Calumet Harbor
  - Station Grand Haven
  - Station Manistee
  - Station Michigan City
  - Station Milwaukee
  - Station Sheboygan
  - Station St. Joseph
  - Station Sturgeon Bay
    - Marine Safety Detachment Sturgeon Bay
  - Station Wilmette Harbor
  - Aids to Navigation Team Muskegon
  - Aids to Navigation Team Two Rivers
  - Marine Safety Unit Chicago
- Sector Northern Great Lakes (formerly Sector Sault Sainte Marie)
  - Station Bayfield
  - Station Charlevoix
  - Station Duluth
    - Aids to Navigation Team Duluth
  - Marine Safety Unit Duluth
  - Station Marquette
  - Station Portage
  - Station Sault Sainte Marie
  - Aids to Navigation Team Sault Ste. Marie
  - Station St. Ignace
- District controlled units and cutters
  - Coast Guard Air Station Detroit
  - Coast Guard Air Station Traverse City
  - USCGC Hollyhock (WLB-214)
  - USCGC Alder (WLB-216)
  - USCGC Mackinaw (WLBB-30)
  - USCGC Buckthorn (WLI-642)
  - USCGC Katmai Bay (WTGB-101)
  - USCGC Bristol Bay (WTGB-102)
  - USCGC Mobile Bay (WTGB-103)
  - USCGC Biscayne Bay (WTGB-104)
  - USCGC Neah Bay (WTGB-105)
  - USCGC Morro Bay (WTGB-106)

=== Atlantic Area Controlled Units and Cutters ===
- United States Coast Guard National Strike Force Coordination Center
  - United States Coast Guard Incident Management Assist Team
  - Public Information Assist Team
  - Atlantic Strike Team
  - Gulf Strike Team
  - Pacific Strike Team
- United States Coast Guard Patrol Forces Southwest Asia
  - Port Security Unit Kuwait
  - Port Security Unit Bahrain
  - Maritime Engagement Team
  - USCGC Maui (WPB-1304)
  - USCGC Aquideck (WPB-1309)
  - USCGC Baranof (WPB-1318)
  - USCGC Monomoy (WPB-1326)
  - USCGC Wrangell (WPB-1332)
  - USCGC Adak (WPB-1333)
- United States Coast Guard Activities Europe
- USCGC Reliance (WMEC-615)
- USCGC Diligence (WMEC-616)
- USCGC Vigilant (WMEC-617)
- USCGC Confidence (WMEC-619)
- USCGC Resolute (WMEC-620)
- USCGC Valiant (WMEC-621)
- USCGC Dauntless (WMEC-624)
- USCGC Venturous (WMEC-625)
- USCGC Dependable (WMEC-626)
- USCGC Vigorous (WMEC-627)
- USCGC Decisive (WMEC-629)
- USCGC Bear (WMEC-901)
- USCGC Tampa (WMEC-902)
- USCGC Harriet Lane (WMEC-903)
- USCGC Northland (WMEC-904)
- USCGC Spencer (WMEC-905)
- USCGC Seneca (WMEC-906)
- USCGC Escanaba (WMEC-907)
- USCGC Tahoma (WMEC-908)
- USCGC Campbell (WMEC-909)
- USCGC Thetis (WMEC-910)
- USCGC Forward (WMEC-911)
- USCGC Legare (WMEC-912)
- USCGC Mohawk (WMEC-913)
- USCGC Hamilton (WMSL-753)
- USCGC James (WMSL-754)
- United States Coast Guard Incident Management Support Team
- United States Coast Guard NORAD/USNORTHCOM
- United States Coast Guard Reserve Unit-USSOUTHCOM
- United States Coast Guard Reserve Unit-USNORTHCOM
- United States Coast Guard Reserve Unit-USTRANSCOM

== Pacific Area ==
=== Southwest District ===
- Sector Humboldt Bay
  - Station Humboldt Bay
    - Aids to Navigation Team Humboldt Bay
  - Station Noyo River
  - USCGC Barracuda (WPB-87301)
  - USCGC Dorado (WPB-87306)
- Sector Los Angeles/Long Beach
  - Station Channel Islands
  - Station Los Angeles/Long Beach
    - Aids to Navigation Team Los Angeles/Long Beach
  - Station Morro Bay
  - Marine Safety Detachment Santa Barbara
  - USCGC Blackfin (WPB-87317)
  - USCGC Blacktip (WPB-87326)
  - USCGC Narwhal (WPB-87335)
  - USCGC Halibut (WPB-87340)
  - USCGC Forrest Rednour(WPC-1129)
- Sector San Diego
  - Station San Diego
    - Aids to Navigation Team San Diego
  - USCGC Haddock (WPB-87347)
  - USCGC Petrel (WPB-87350)
  - USCGC Sea Otter (WPB-87362)
- Sector San Francisco
  - Station Bodega Bay
  - Station Golden Gate
  - Station Lake Tahoe
  - Station Monterey
  - Station Rio Vista
  - Station San Francisco
    - Aids to Navigation Team San Francisco
  - Station Vallejo
  - USCGC Hawksbill (WPB-87312)
  - USCGC Sockeye (WPB-87337)
  - USCGC Tern (WPB-87343)
  - USCGC Pike (WPB-87365)
- District controlled units and cutters
  - Coast Guard Air Station Humboldt Bay
  - Coast Guard Air Station Sacramento
  - Coast Guard Air Station San Diego
  - Coast Guard Air Station San Francisco
  - USCGC Aspen (WLB-208)
  - USCGC George Cobb (WLM-564)

=== Northwest District ===
- Sector Columbia River
  - Station Cape Disappointment
  - Station Greys Harbor
  - Station Portland
    - Marine Safety Unit Portland
  - Station Tillamook Bay
  - Aids to Navigation Team Astoria
  - Aids to Navigation Team Kennewick
  - USCGC Bluebell (WLI-313)
- Sector North Bend
  - Station Chetco River
  - Station Coos Bay
  - Station Depoe Bay
  - Station Siuslaw River
  - Station Umpqua River
  - Station Yaquina Bay
  - Aids to Navigation Team Coos Bay
  - USCGC Orcas (WPB-1327)
- Sector Puget Sound
  - Station Bellingham
  - Station Neah Bay
  - Station Port Angeles
  - Station Quillayute River
  - Station Seattle
    - Aids to Navigation Team Puget Sound
  - USCGC Cuttyhunk (WPB-1322)
  - USCGC Osprey (WPB-87307)
  - USCGC Adelie (WPB-87333)
  - USCGC Wahoo (WPB-87345)
  - USCGC Sea Lion (WPB-87352)
  - USCGC Swordfish (WPB-87358)
  - USCGC Blue Shark (WPB-87360)
  - USCGC Terrapin (WPB-87366)
- District controlled units and cutters
  - Coast Guard Air Station Astoria
  - Coast Guard Air Station North Bend
  - Coast Guard Air Station Port Angeles
  - Maritime Force Protection Unit-Bangor
    - USCGC Sea Devil (WPB-87368)
    - USCGC Sea Fox (WPB-87374)
  - USCGC Fir (WLB-213)
  - USCGC Henry Blake(WLM-563)

=== Oceania District ===
- Sector Guam
  - Station Apra Harbor
  - Marine Safety Detachment Saipan
- Sector Honolulu
  - Station Honolulu
    - Aids to Navigation Team Honolulu
    - Marine Safety Team Hawaii
  - Station Kauai
  - Station Maui
    - Marine Safety Team Maui
  - Marine Safety Detachment Samoa
  - USCGC Kittiwake (WPB-87316)
  - USCGC Ahi (WPB-87364)
- District controlled units and cutters
  - USCG Activities Far East
    - Marine Inspection Detachment Singapore
  - Coast Guard Air Station Barbers Point
  - USCGC Walnut (WLB-205)
  - USCGC Sequoia (WLB-215)
  - USCGC Washington (WPB-1331)
  - USCGC Kiska (WPB-1336)
  - USCGC Oliver F. Berry (WPC-1124)
  - USCGC Joseph Gerczak (WPC-1126)

=== Arctic District ===
- Sector Anchorage
  - Station Valdez
    - Marine Safety Unit Valdez
  - Aids to Navigation Team Kodiak
  - Marine Safety Detachment Dutch Harbor
  - Marine Safety Detachment Homer
  - Marine Safety Detachment Kodiak
  - USCGC Mustang (WPB-1310)
  - USCGC Naushon (WPB-1311)
  - USCGC Chandeleur (WPB-1319)
- Sector Juneau
  - Station Juneau
  - Station Ketchikan
    - Marine Safety Detachment Ketchikan
  - Aids to Navigation Team Sitka
  - Marine Safety Detachment Sitka
  - USCGC Kukui (WLB-203)
  - USCGC Elderberry (WLI-65401)
  - USCGC Anthony Petit (WLM-558)
  - USCGC Liberty (WPB-1334)
  - USCGC Anacapa (WPB-1335)
  - USCGC John F. McCormick (WPC-1121)
  - USCGC Bailey T. Barco (WPC-1122)
- District controlled units and cutters
  - Coast Guard Air Station Kodiak
  - Coast Guard Air Station Sitka
  - USCGC Spar (WLB-206)
  - USCGC Sycamore (WLB-209)
  - USCGC Hickory (WLB-212)
  - Aids to Navigation Team Kodiak

=== Pacific Area Controlled Units and Cutters ===
- USCGC Polar Star (WAGB-10)
- USCGC Polar Sea (WAGB-11)
- USCGC Healy (WAGB-20)
- USCGC Alex Haley (WMEC-39)
- USCGC Active (WMEC-618)
- USCGC Steadfast (WMEC-623)
- USCGC Alert (WMEC-630)
- USCGC Bertholf (WMSL-750)
- USCGC Waesche (WMSL-751)
- USCGC Stratton (WMSL-752)
- USCGC Munro (WMSL-755)
- USCGC Kimball (WMSL-756)
- USCGC Mellon (WHEC-717)
- USCGC Douglas Munro (WHEC-724)
- USCGC Midgett (WHEC-726)
- Maritime Safety and Security Team 91101
- Maritime Safety and Security Team 91103
- Maritime Safety and Security Team 91104
- Maritime Safety and Security Team 91105
- Maritime Safety and Security Team 91106
- Maritime Safety and Security Team 91107
- Maritime Safety and Security Team 91108
- Maritime Safety and Security Team 91110
- Maritime Safety and Security Team 91112
- Maritime Safety and Security Team 91114
- Port Security Unit 301
- Port Security Unit 305
- Port Security Unit 307
- Port Security Unit 308
- Port Security Unit 309
- Port Security Unit 311
- Port Security Unit 312
- Port Security Unit 313
- Tactical Law Enforcement Team Pacific
- Tactical Law Enforcement Team South
- Maritime Safety and Security Team-East
- Maritime Safety and Security Team-West
