= Coast Guard Atlantic Area =

Area command of the United States Coast Guard

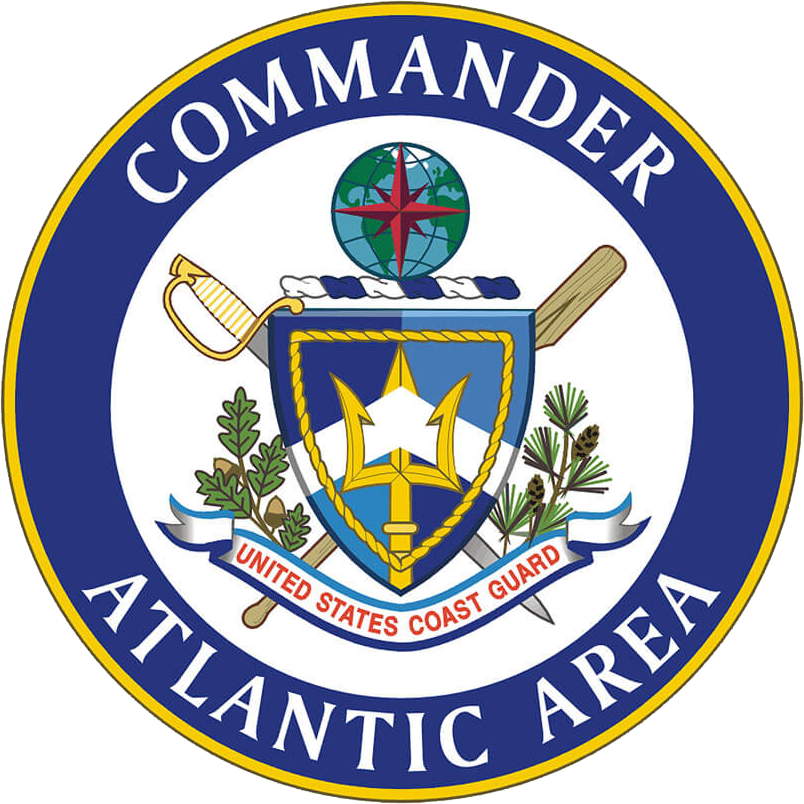
- Country: United States
- Branch: United States Coast Guard
- Type: Area command
- Headquarters: Portsmouth Federal Building, Portsmouth, Virginia
- Nickname: LANTAREA
- Website: Official website

Commanders
- Area Commander: VADM Jo-Ann F. Burdian
- Deputy Area Commander: RADM Mark J. Fedor
- Command Master Chief: CMC Charlie F. Salls

Coast Guard Atlantic Area (LANTAREA) is an Area Command of the United States Coast Guard, a regional command element and force provider tasked with maritime safety, security, and stewardship throughout the Atlantic. The command oversees all Coast Guard domestic operations east of the Rocky Mountains, including the Caribbean and foreign areas of interest in Europe, Africa, and Southeast Asia.

== Organizational structure ==
Five regional districts commands run day-to-day operations. Atlantic Area is responsible for coordinating and deploying cutters, aircraft, pollution response equipment, and thousands of personnel between districts when major events occur. After major disasters, Atlantic Area assists districts by ensuring resources, equipment, and personnel are surged to impacted areas for rescue and recovery efforts, while also ensuring other Coast Guard operations throughout the region continue.

Under LANTAREA are the Coast Guard's Northeast, East, Southeast, Heartland and Great Lakes Districts.

LANTAREA deploys cutters to areas within their control to combat transnational organized crime, to prevent, deter, detect and interdict illicit smuggling efforts.

== Operational assets ==
In addition to assets at each of its subordinate units, the Atlantic Area command's operational assets include:

- Cutters
  - CGC Alert
  - CGC Bear
  - CGC Calhoun
  - CGC Campbell
  - CGC Charles Moulthrope
  - CGC Clarence Sutphin Jr.
  - CGC Diligence
  - CGC Eagle
  - CGC Emlen Tunnell
  - CGC Escanaba
  - CGC Forward
  - CGC Glen Harris
  - CGC Hamilton
  - CGC James
  - CGC John Scheuerman
  - CGC Legare
  - CGC Mohawk
  - CGC Northland
  - CGC Reliance
  - CGC Resolute
  - CGC Robert Goldman
  - CGC Seneca
  - CGC Spencer
  - CGC Stone
  - CGC Tahoma
  - CGC Tampa
  - CGC Thetis
  - CGC Valiant
  - CGC Venturous
  - CGC Vigilant
  - CGC Vigorous
- USCG Activities Europe
- Communications Command
- Maritime Intelligence Fusion Center (MIFC) LANT
- Maritime Security Response Team (MSRT) East
- Maritime Safety and Security Team (MSST)
  - MSST 91104 (Houston)
  - MSST 91106 (New York)
  - MSST 91108 (Kings Bay, GA)
  - MSST 91110 (Cape Cod)
  - MSST 91112 (New Orleans)
  - MSST 91114 (Miami)
- National Strike Force (NSF)
- Patrol Forces Southwest Asia
- Tactical Law Enforcement Team (TACLET)
