= U.S. Coast Guard Northwest District =

U.S. Coast Guard District for the Pacific Northwest

Department of Homeland Security United States Coast Guard
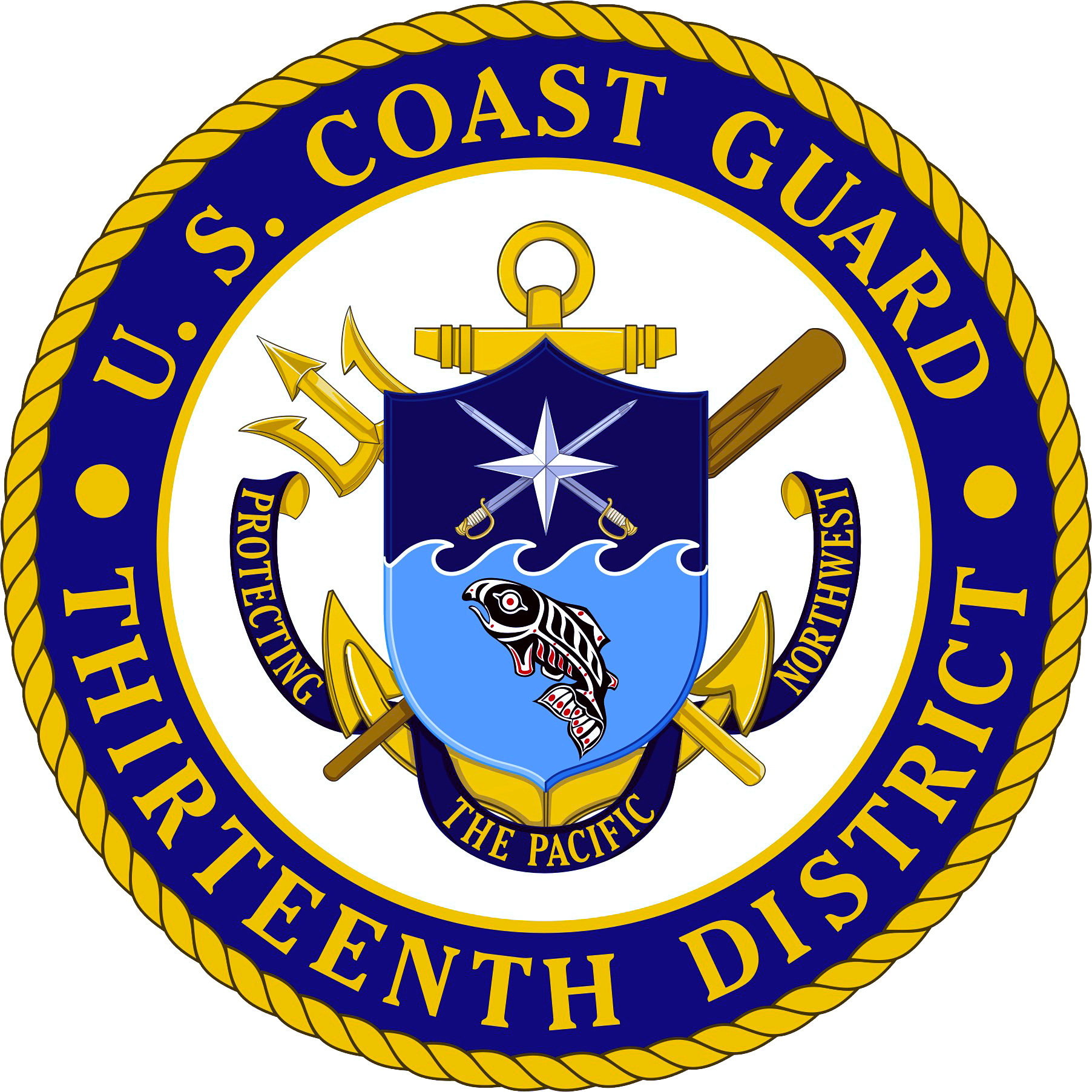
- Logo of United States Coast Guard Northwest District
- Country: United States of America
- Branch: Coast Guard
- Size: 2,000+
- Part of: Pacific Area
- Headquarters: Seattle, Washington (Henry M. Jackson Federal Building)
- Mottos: Semper Paratus (Always Ready)

Commanders
- District Commander: RADM Charles E. Fosse
- Chief of Staff: CAPT Holly R. Harrison
- Command Master Chief: MCPO Michael P. Demopoulos

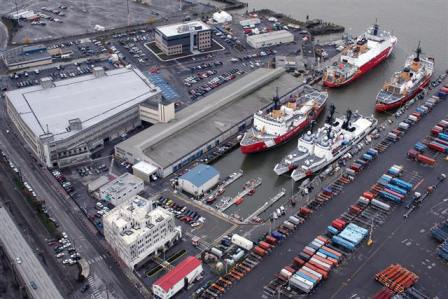
An aerial view of Base Seattle

U.S. Coast Guard Northwest District is based at the Henry M. Jackson Federal Building, in Seattle, Washington. It covers the Pacific Northwest and its area of responsibility encompasses four states; Washington, Oregon, Idaho, and Montana. Northwest District is divided into two Sectors – Puget Sound and Columbia River. The district has more than 3,000 active duty and reserve members, civilian employees, and auxiliaries and operates twenty-one cutters, 132 boats and eleven aircraft.

== Command and duties ==
Northwest District's assets carry out an array of daily operations including search and rescue, coastal patrols to enforce safety and fisheries regulations, conduct safety and compliance inspections, examine commercial vessels and waterfront facilities, and protect strategic defense and critical infrastructure. The District also contains the United States largest domestic ferry system, as well as the third largest domestic port, the third largest cruise ship port, and the largest grain export gateway in the country. Northwest District also provides support and ports to various Coast Guard Pacific Area assets, including two high endurance cutters, three medium endurance cutters, two icebreakers, a Port Security Unit, Maritime Safety and Security Team, and Base Seattle.

Northwest District is commanded by RADM Charles E. Fosse.

== Northwest District units ==
Northwest District

- Coast Guard Northwest District HQ, Jackson Federal Building, Seattle, Washington
- USCGC Elm WLB-204, Base Tongue Point, Astoria, Oregon
- USCGC Henry Blake (WLM-563), Naval Station Everett, Everett, Washington

Sector Puget Sound

- USCG Station Seattle, Seattle, Washington
  - Sector Puget Sound HQ
  - Aids to Navigation Team Puget Sound
  - Puget Sound Vessel Traffic Service
  - Marine Safety Office Puget Sound
- USCG Station Quillayute River, La Push, Washington
- USCG Station Port Angeles, Port Angeles, Washington
  - Sector Field Office (SFO) Port Angeles
  - USCGC Adelie (WPB-87333)
  - USCGC Swordfish (WPB-87358)
  - USCGC Wahoo (WPB-87345)
- USCG Station Bellingham, Bellingham, Washington
  - USCGC Sea Lion (WPB-87352)
  - USCGC Terrapin (WPB-87366)
- USCG Station Neah Bay, Neah Bay, Washington
- USCGC Blueshark (WPB-87360), Naval Station Everett, Everett, Washington
- USCGC Osprey (WPB-87307), Port Townsend, Washington
- Maritime Force Protection Unit Bangor, Naval Base Kitsap-Bangor, Silverdale, Washington
  - USCGC Sea Devil (WPB-87368)
  - USCGC Sea Fox (WPB-87374)

Sector Columbia River

- Sector Columbia River HQ, Portland, Oregon
- USCG Station Cape Disappointment, Ilwaco, Washington
  - National Motor Lifeboat School
- USCG Station Grays Harbor, Westport, Washington
- USCG Station Portland, Portland, Oregon
  - Marine Safety Office/Group Portland
  - USCGC Bluebell (WLI-313)
- USCG Station Tillamook Bay, Garibaldi, Oregon
- Aids to Navigation Team Astoria, Astoria, OR
- Aids to Navigation Team Kennewick, Kennewick, Washington
- Sector North Bend HQ, North Bend, Oregon
- USCG Station Chetco River, Harbor, Oregon
- USCG Station Coos Bay, Charleston, Oregon
  - Aids to Navigation Team Coos Bay
  - USCGC Orcas (WPB-1327)
- USCG Station Depoe Bay, Newport, Oregon
- USCG Station Siuslaw River, Florence, Oregon
- USCG Station Umpqua River, Winchester Bay, Oregon
- USCG Station Yaquina Bay, Newport, Oregon

PACAREA Units

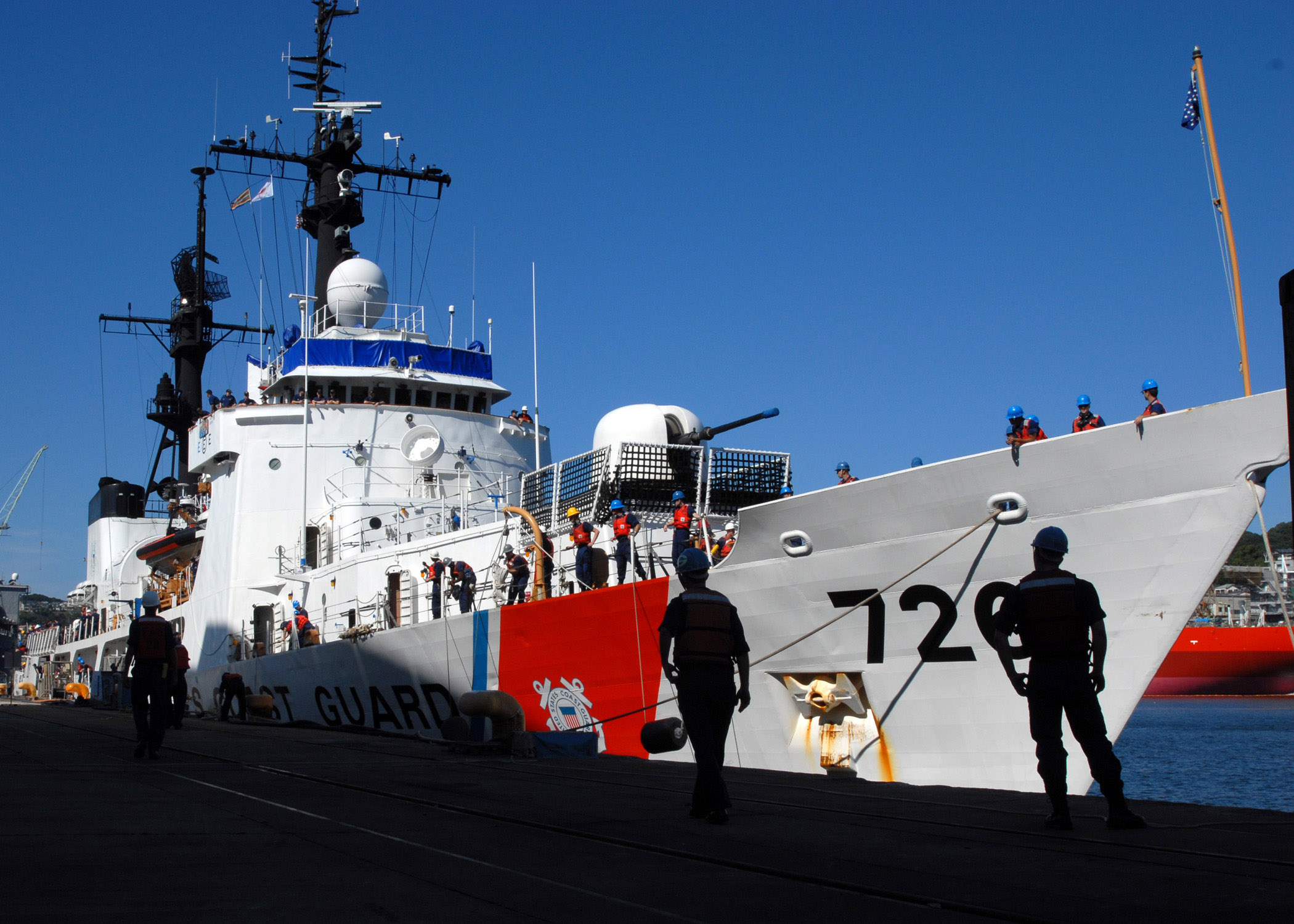
USCGC Midgett (WHEC-726), a high endurance cutter, moors in Sasebo, Japan during extended operations

- USCG Base Seattle, Seattle, Washington
- Maritime Safety and Security Team (MSST) 91101, Seattle
- Port Security Unit 313, Tacoma, Washington
- USCGC Healy (WAGB-20), Seattle
- USCGC Polar Sea (WAGB-11), Seattle (Out of service since 2010, and now provides spare parts for Polar Star.)
- USCGC Polar Star (WAGB-10), Seattle
- USCGC Mellon (WHEC-717), Seattle
- USCGC Midgett (WHEC-726), Seattle
- USCGC Active (WMEC-618), Port Angeles, Washington
- USCGC Alert (WMEC-630), Warrenton, Oregon
- USCGC Steadfast (WMEC-623), Warrenton

HQ Units

- Facilities Design & Construction Center, Seattle, Washington
- Investigation Services Northwest, Seattle
- USCG Recruiting Offices
  - Tukwila, Washington
  - Vancouver, Washington
  - Boise, Idaho
- Regional Exam Centers
  - Seattle, Washington
  - Portland, Oregon

== Training and other responsibilities ==
In addition to handling the nation's largest amount of recreational traffic, the Northwest District is home to one of two Maritime Force Protection Units, which are responsible for escorting America's Trident ballistic-missile submarines to and from their home port. It is also the home of the National Motor Lifeboat School near Coast Guard Station Cape Disappointment in Ilwaco, Washington. The Advanced Helicopter Rescue School across the Columbia River teaches extreme rescue scenarios at the Tongue Point and Air Station in Astoria, Oregon.

== List of Northwest District Auxiliary Units ==
AUX-District	District Seal	Divisions	Location
CG AUX Northwest District		Northern Washington #01	North Western Washington
CG AUX Northwest District		Seattle Metro #02	Seattle, Washington
CG AUX Northwest District		Tacoma and Central Washington #03	Puget Sound, Washington
CG AUX Northwest District		Olympic Peninsula #04	Olympic Peninsula and Salish Sea
CG AUX Northwest District		Oregon #05	Southern Oregon Coast
CG AUX Northwest District		Columbia River Delta #06	Pacific City, Oregon through Copalis Beach, Washington
CG AUX Northwest District		Portland & Columbia River #07	Portland and Northern Oregon
CG AUX Northwest District		Columbia Plateau #08	Eastern Washington and Idaho Panhandle
CG AUX Northwest District		Montana #10	Montana
CG AUX Northwest District		Idaho #11	Idaho
