= Nathan A. Moore =

United States Coast Guard vice admiral (born 1970)

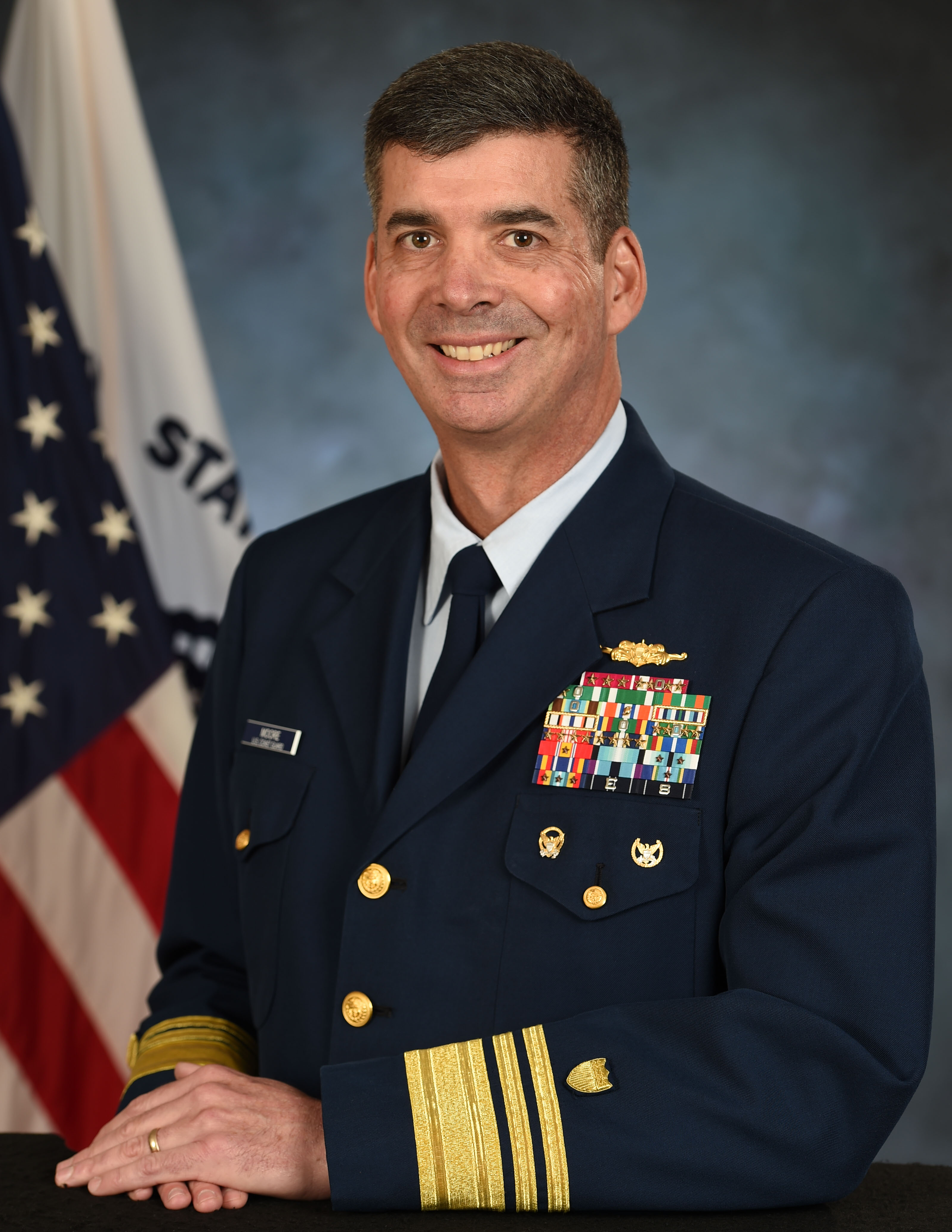
- Official portrait, 2024
- Nickname: Nate
- Born: 5 September 1970 (age 55); Akron, Ohio, U.S.
- Allegiance: United States
- Branch: United States Coast Guard
- Service years: 1992–present
- Rank: Vice Admiral
- Commands: Coast Guard Atlantic Area; Seventeenth Coast Guard District
- Education: United States Coast Guard Academy (BS) University of Michigan (MS, MBA) Eisenhower School (MS)

Nathan A. Moore (born 5 September 1970) is a United States Coast Guard vice admiral who served as commander of the Coast Guard Atlantic Area. He previously served as deputy commander of the Coast Guard Atlantic Area and as commander of the Seventeenth Coast Guard District.

== Early life and education ==
Moore was born on 5 September 1970 in Akron, Ohio and graduated from Gadsden High School in 1988. He attended the United States Coast Guard Academy, where he was a member of Alfa Company. He graduated in 1992 with a Bachelor of Science in Naval Architecture and Marine Engineering. He later attended the University of Michigan, where he earned a Master of Science in Naval Architecture in Marine Engineering and an MBA in 1998. He also attended the Dwight D. Eisenhower School for National Security and Resource Strategy, graduating with a Master of Science in National Resource Strategy in 2013.

== Military service ==
Moore served as an engineer and a cutterman, serving aboard the USCGC Polar Star as a student. After graduation, he served on the USCGC Harriet Lane as an Engineer Officer and on the USCGC Venturous as the Executive Officer. He commanded two ships: the USCGC Resolute and the USCGC Stratton.

As a staff officer, Moore served at the Navy Surface Warfare Officer School as a ship stability instructor, commanded Naval Engineering Support Unit Honolulu, was Chief of the Officer Assignment Branch at Personnel Services Center, and was Chief of the office of Naval Engineering at Coast Guard Headquarters.

From 2017 to 2019, Moore was the Deputy Commander and Chief of Staff of Coast Guard Pacific Area. From 2019 to 2021, he was the Assistant Commandant for Engineering and Logistics. While serving in the latter position, he testified to the House Coast Guard & Maritime Transportation Subcommittee (under the United States House Committee on Transportation and Infrastructure) about Coast Guard Infrastructure.

On 23 April 2021, Moore took command of the Seventeenth Coast Guard District. He replaced the outgoing commander, Rear Admiral Matthew T. Bell, who had previously voiced his support for Moore's command. On 9 June 2023, he became deputy commander of the Coast Guard Atlantic Area.

In January 2024, Moore was nominated for promotion to vice admiral and assignment as commander of the Coast Guard Atlantic Area. He assumed command on 16 May 2024. He is scheduled to be nominated as the next deputy commandant for operations of the Coast Guard.

== Awards and Commendations ==
- Legion of Merit (one star)
- Meritorious Service Medal (three stars)
- Coast Guard Commendation Medal (one star)
- Navy Commendation Medal

== Personal life ==
His parents are Nate and Judy Moore.

Military offices
Preceded by ???	Assistant Commandant for Engineering and Logistics of the United States Coast Guard; 2019–2021	Succeeded by Carola List
Preceded by Matthew T. Bell Jr.	Commander of the Seventeenth Coast Guard District; 2021–2023	Succeeded by Megan Dean
Preceded by Laura M. Dickey	Deputy Commander of the Coast Guard Atlantic Area; 2023–2024	Succeeded by John C. Vann
Preceded by Kevin Lunday	Director of the Homeland Security Joint Task Force – East and Commander of the Coast Guard Atlantic Area; 2024–2026	Succeeded by Jo-Ann F. Burdian
