= USCGC Bear =

USCGC Bear is the name of the following ships of the United States Coast Guard:

- USCGC Bear (1915), launched in 1874 in Newfoundland as SS Bear, sold to U.S. in 1884 and was USRC/USCGC Bear until transfer to the Navy as USS Bear during WWII and eventually transferred to Canada in 1946 and sank in 1963
- USCGC Bear (WMEC-901), launched in 1980 and still in active service
