= Sea Fox =

Sea Fox, SeaFox, Seafox may refer to:

- USS Sea Fox (SS-402), a crewed submarine
- USCGC Sea Fox, a coastal patrol boat
- Seafox drone, a remotely operated expendable submarine
- Fairey Seafox, an aeroplane
- A clan in the BattleTech fictional universe
- Common thresher, a large species of thresher shark
