= USCGC Sea Devil =

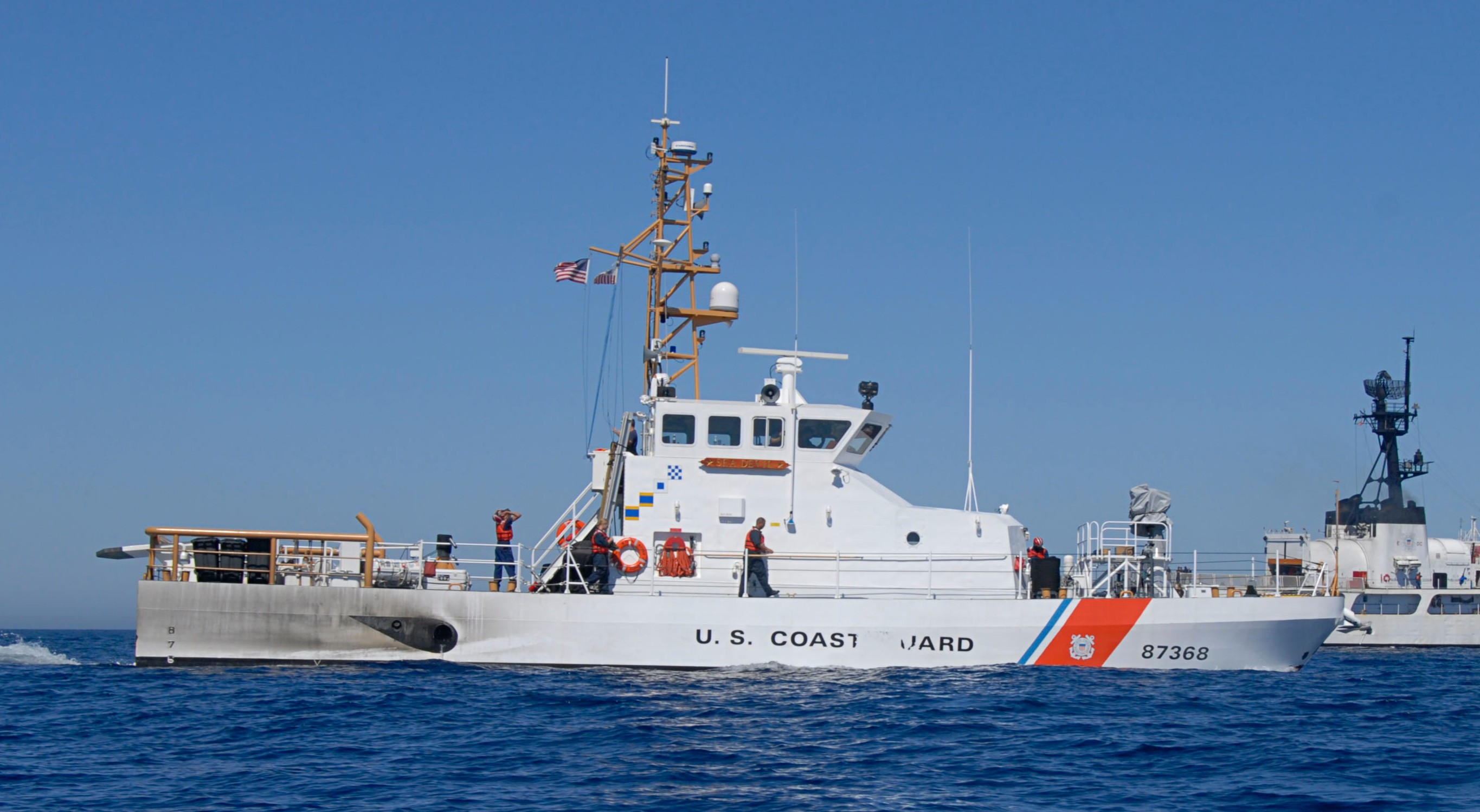
- USCGC Sea Devil

History

United States
- Name: USCGC Sea Devil
- Builder: Bollinger Shipyards, Lockport, Louisiana
- Home port: Kings Bay, Georgia
- Identification: MMSI number: 369493397; Callsign: NSDD
- Status: in active service

General characteristics
- Class & type: Marine Protector-class coastal patrol boat
- Displacement: 91 long tons (92 t)
- Length: 87 ft 0 in (26.5 m)
- Beam: 19 ft 5 in (5.9 m)
- Draft: 5 ft 7 in (1.7 m)
- Propulsion: 2 x MTU diesels
- Speed: 25 knots (46 km/h)
- Range: 900 nmi (1,700 km)
- Endurance: 5 days
- Complement: 10
- Armament: 3 × .50 caliber M2 Browning machine guns

USCGC Sea Devil (WPB-87368) the 70th Marine Protector-class coastal patrol boat to be built, and the first of four to be paid for by the US Navy. It is operated by the U.S. Coast Guard. Her home port is Kings Bay, Georgia, where she and her sister ship Sea Fox are assigned to one of two Maritime Force Protection Units. Their sole mission is to escort the Navy's largest submarines, the nuclear-armed Ohio class, while in and near their moorings. When first commissioned, Sea Devil and Sea Fox were assigned to the same duty at the other Maritime Force Protection Unit at Naval Base Kitsap in Washington. They left Washington for Georgia to replace the decommissioned USCGC Sea Dragon and USCGC Sea Dog.

The submarines require an escort because, while they carry some of the most powerful weapons ever built, they do not mount weapons suitable to protect them from surface threats, like the speedboat that carried a bomb that damaged USS Cole.

== Design ==
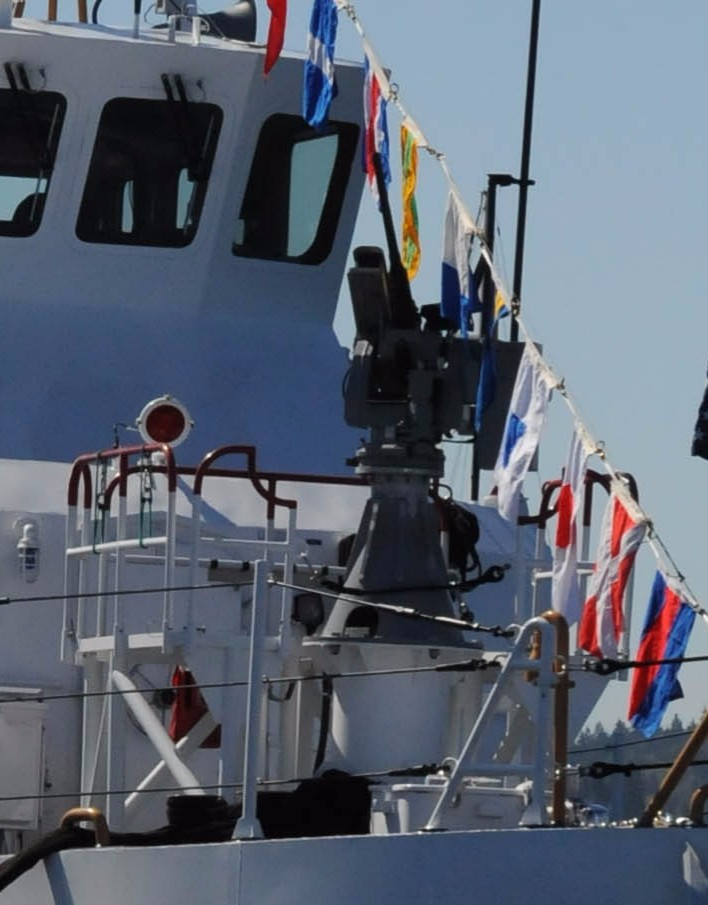
Unlike most other ships of her class, Sea Devil mounts a gyro-stabilized remote controlled machine gun.

Sea Devil is slightly modified from the standard design of a Marine Protector cutter, the smallest cutter the Coast Guard currently has in service. Like her sister ships, she is 87 feet (27 m) long, displaces approximately 90 tonnes, and has a maximum speed of 25 knots (46 km/h). They are all equipped with a (water)jet-propelled pursuit boat, that is deployed and retrieved via a stern launching ramp, enabling it to be used without bringing the cutter to a halt.

Sea Devil, and the three other vessels, have been modified from the design of the Coast Guard's other Marine Protector cutters. These four vessels mount an additional gyro-stabilized remotely controlled machine gun. The main armament of the standard Marine Protector cutter are a pair of .50-caliber (12.7mm) Browning machine guns, mounted on the rail to either side of the vessel's foredeck. The long range accuracy of these weapons is low, when fired by a gunner on a pitching deck, aiming using "iron sights". Sea Devil and the three other cutters have a pedestal in the middle of the foredeck that gives their main armament a better field of fire. The gun mounted on the pedestal is the same Browning as the other guns, but gyro stabilization compensates for the pitching deck. The mount is equipped with multiple cameras, enabling the gun aimer on the bridge to focus the gun's sights on a distant target, even at night, or when visibility is impaired by smoke, or fog.

To complete their missions these four ships carry a larger crew. Where a standard Marine Protector cutter deploys with a crew of ten, these vessels deploy with a crew of fifteen.
