= USCGC Sea Dragon =

Marine Protector-class cutter

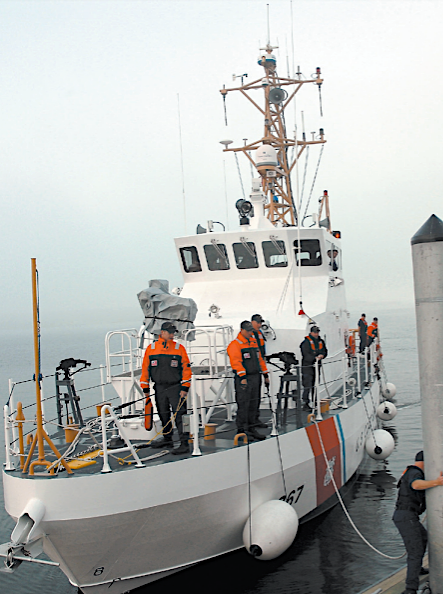
- A gray tarpaulin covers Sea Dragon's advanced remote-control mount for its extra machine gun.

History

United States
- Name: USCGC Sea Dragon
- Builder: Bollinger Shipyards, Lockport, Louisiana
- Commissioned: January 2008
- Decommissioned: May 29, 2024
- Status: in active service

General characteristics
- Class & type: Marine Protector-class coastal patrol boat
- Displacement: 91 long tons (92 t)
- Length: 87 ft 0 in (26.5 m)
- Beam: 19 ft 5 in (5.9 m)
- Draft: 5 ft 7 in (1.7 m)
- Propulsion: 2 × MTU diesels
- Speed: 25 knots (46 km/h; 29 mph)
- Range: 900 nmi (1,700 km; 1,000 mi)
- Endurance: 3 days
- Complement: 10
- Armament: 3 × .50-caliber M2 Browning machine guns

USCGC Sea Dragon (WPB-87367) is a decommissioned Marine Protector-class cutter that was assigned to one of two special Maritime Force Protection Units. Each Maritime Force Protection Unit escorts nuclear submarines from one of the United States Navy's two main submarine bases. Sea Dragon was assigned to Naval Submarine Base Kings Bay. The other Maritime Force Protection Unit escorts submarines near Bangor, Washington.

Sea Dragon was commissioned in January 2008. She was joined by a sister ship, USCGC Sea Dog, in May 2009. Sea Dragon and Sea Dog were decommissioned on May 29, 2024, and transferred to Marine Corps Air Station Cherry Point. They were replaced by USCGC Sea Devil and USCGC Sea Fox, which had been carrying out the same duties in Washington.

== Design ==
Marine Protector-class cutters are 87 feet (27 m) long. Their maximum speed is 25 knots (46 km/h). All the cutters carry a water-jet propelled fast pursuit boat. The boats can be launched or retrieved without bringing the mothership to a complete halt. The standard Marine Protector is armed with a pair of fifty caliber Browning M2 machine gun, that mount on pintles, on the port and starboard rail of the foredeck. But for the four vessels ordered for the Navy (Sea Dragon, Sea Dog, Sea Devil and Sea Fox) a third machine gun was added, mounted on a pedestal, in the middle of the foredeck. The third machine gun is equipped with advanced optics, is gyro stabilized, and its gunner uses remote controls–making it much more accurate, at long range, when fired from a heaving deck, at night, or in a fog.
