= USCGC Tern =

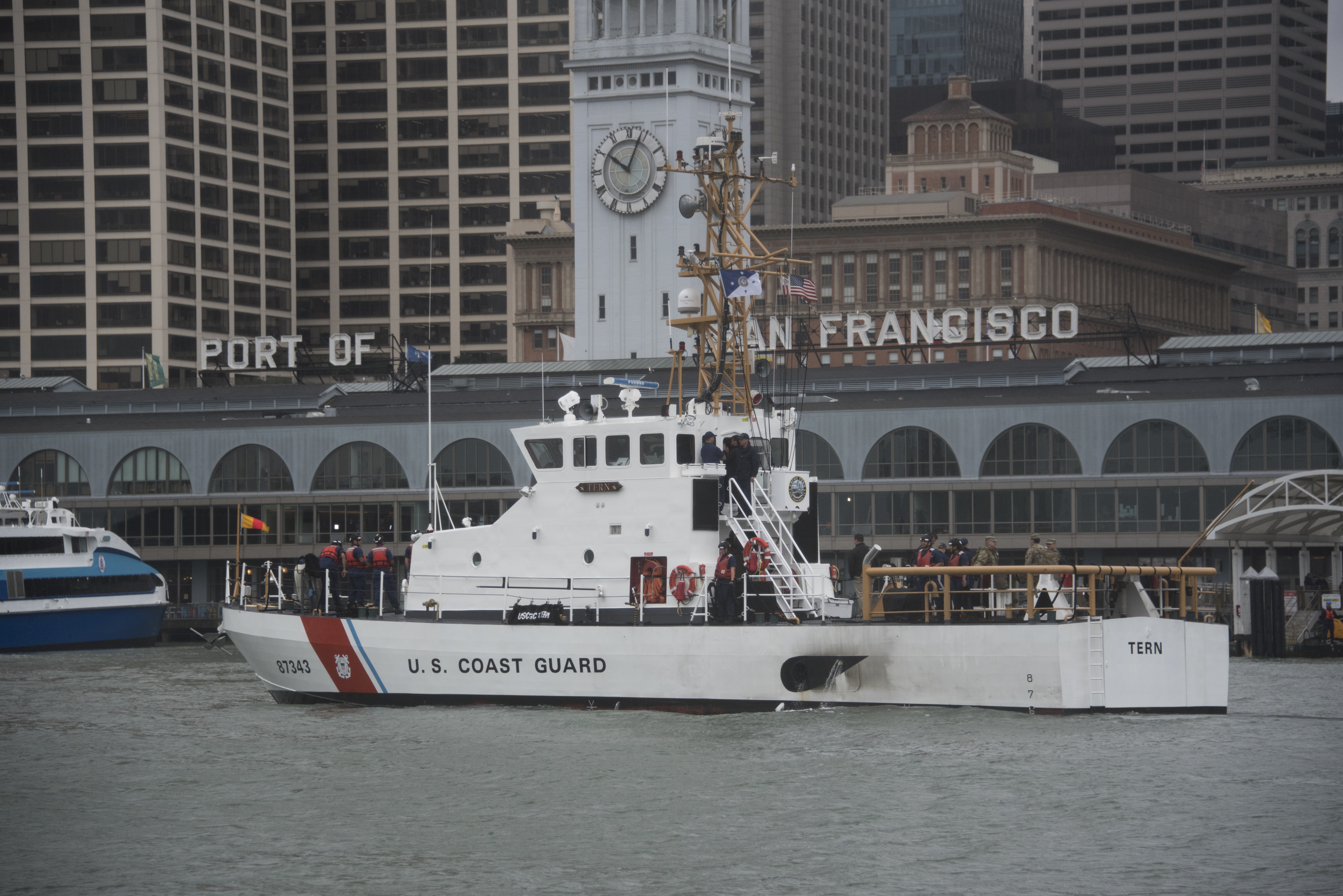

History

United States
- Name: USCGC Tern
- Namesake: Tern
- Builder: Bollinger Shipyards
- Commissioned: 2002
- Home port: San Francisco, California
- Identification: MMSI number: 366999711; Callsign: NEOT
- Motto: Golden State Guardians
- Status: in active service
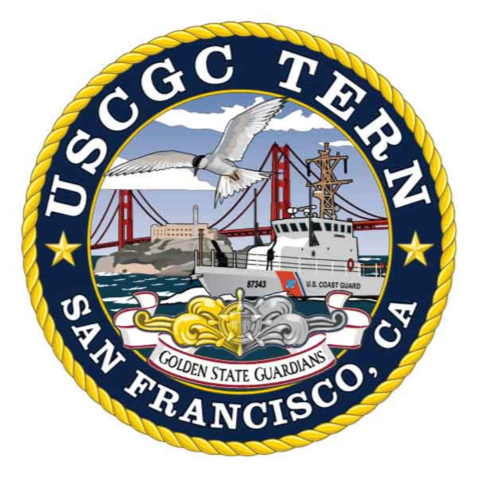
- Badge: Crest of USCGC Tern

General characteristics
- Displacement: 91 lt
- Length: 87 ft (27 m)
- Beam: 19 ft 5 in (5.92 m)
- Draft: 5 ft 7 in (1.70 m)
- Propulsion: 2 x MTU diesels
- Speed: 25 kn (46 km/h; 29 mph)
- Range: 900 nmi (1,700 km)
- Endurance: 5 days
- Complement: 10
- Armament: 2 × .50 caliber M2 Browning machine guns

USCGC Tern (WPB-87343) is an 87-foot (27 m) long Marine Protector-class coastal patrol boat of the United States Coast Guard stationed on Yerba Buena Island in San Francisco, California. Built by Bollinger Shipyards in Lockport, Louisiana and commissioned in 2002, Tern is a multi-mission platform capable of performing search and rescue (SAR), law enforcement (LE), and fisheries patrols, as well as drug interdiction and illegal alien interdiction duties up to 200 miles off shore spanning from Mendocino County, California south to the Mexico–United States border.

Designed in accordance with the American Bureau of Shipping's "Guide of Building and Classing High Speed Crafts" to replace the 82-foot (25 m) Point-class cutter, Tern features a stern launching ramp allowing for underway launch and recovery of the cutter's 7 meter (RHIB) and is capable of towing vessels weighing up to 200 tons.

== History ==
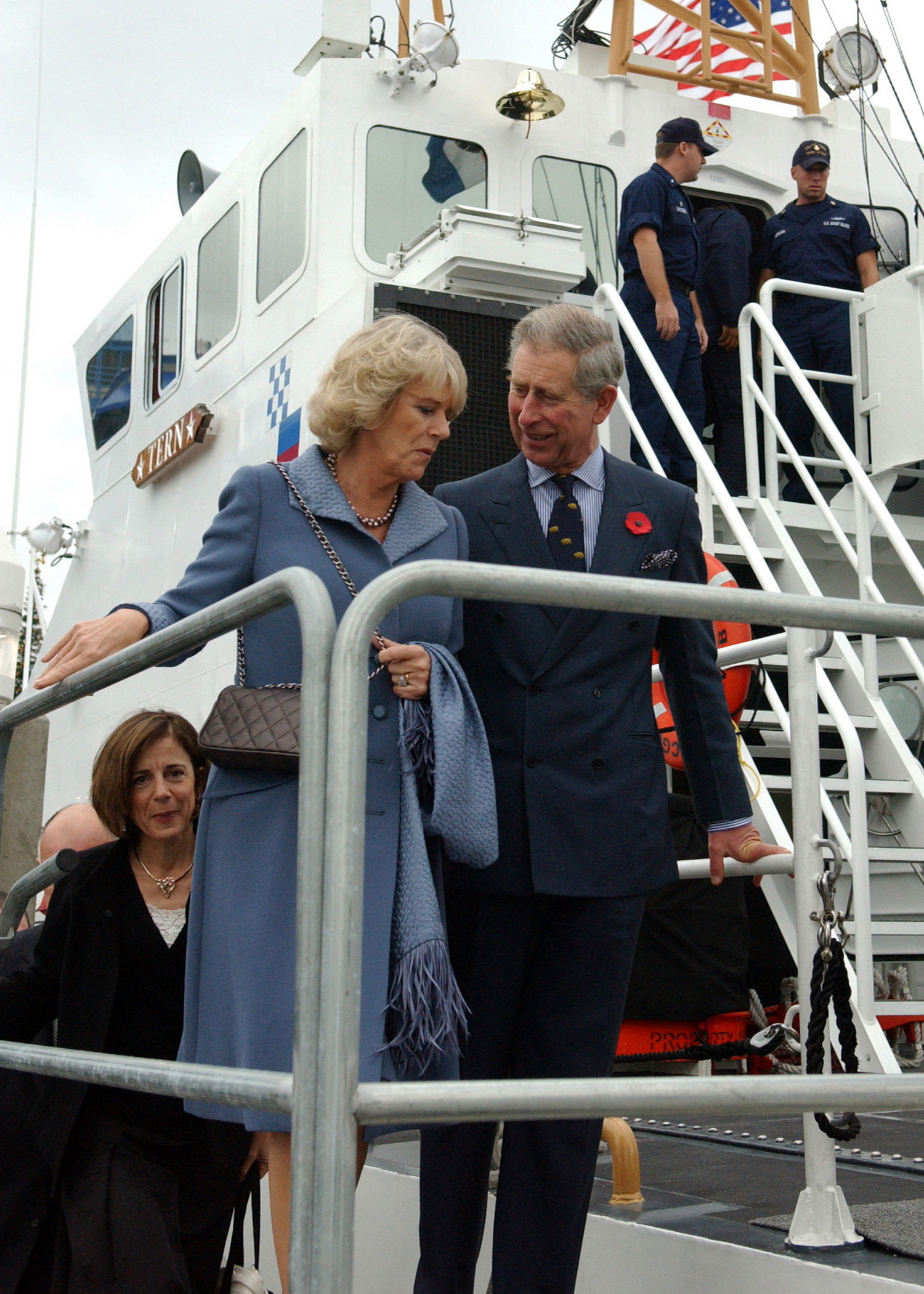
On November 7, 2005, Tern hosted and provided transit for Prince Charles and the Duchess of Cornwall from Jack London Square to the San Francisco ferry terminal.

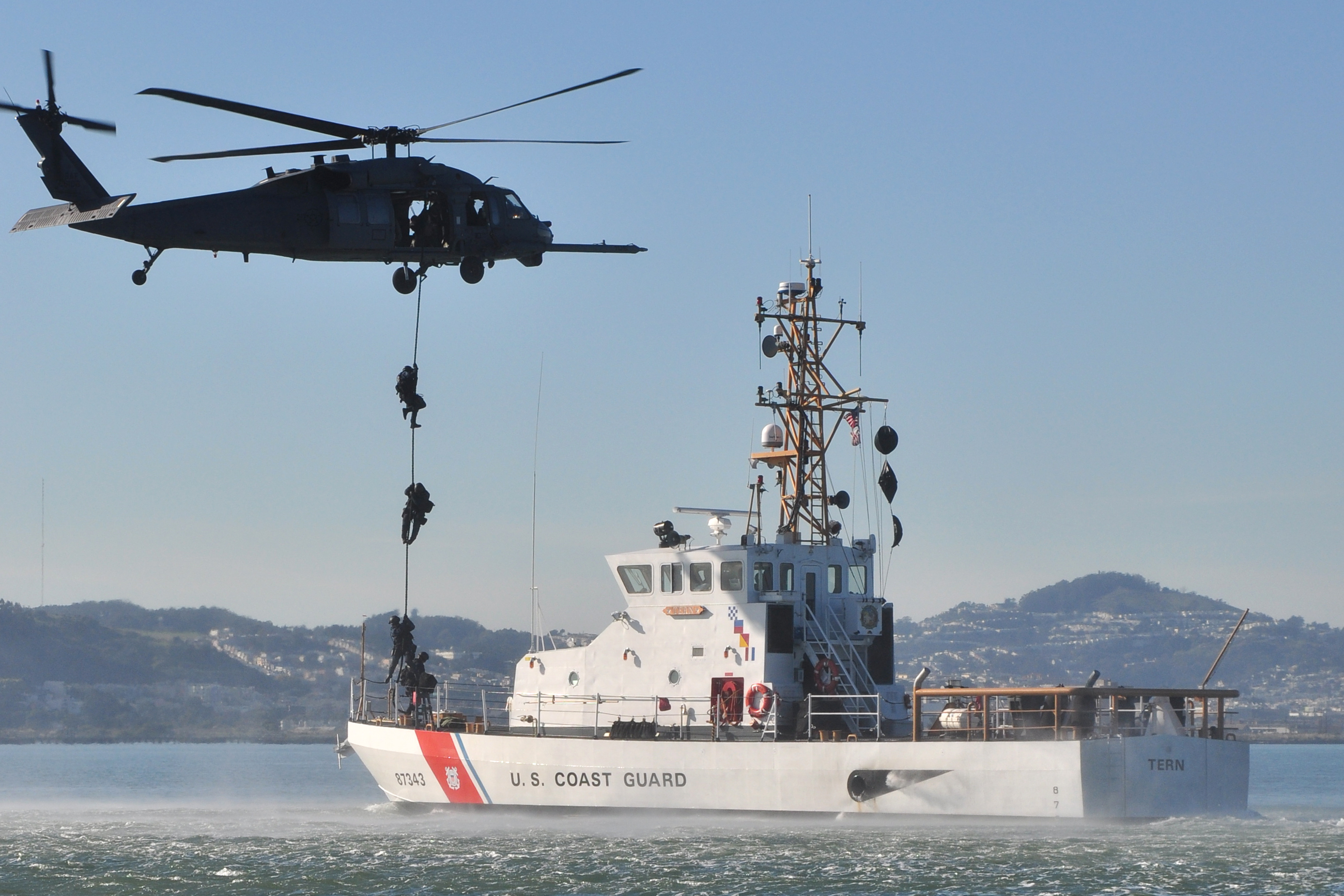
Members of the U.S. Coast Guard Maritime Safety and Security Team 91105 descend from a U.S. Air Force HH-60G Pave Hawk from the 129th Rescue Wing, California Air National Guard, Moffett Federal Airfield, California, onto Tern in the San Francisco Bay Jan. 28, 2009. Crewmembers conducted vertical insertion training, which is a fast-paced technique used to effectively deploy law enforcement teams to a high-risk situation. On January 29, 2009, Tern, Coast Guard Air Station San Francisco, and the 129th Rescue Wing, California Air National Guard rescued a pilot who crashed his plane near Pillar Point Harbor. The rescue ironically occurred the day after Coast Guardsmen and Air National Guardsmen conducted training in the San Francisco Bay.

On July 20, 2011, Tern rescued a 31-foot commercial fishing vessel taking on water off the coast of San Francisco in concert with a pilot boat, helicopter, and lifeboat. The boat, FVTwo Sons, was being flooded with about 100 gallons of water per hour and the boaters were only able to discharge 20 gallons per hour using onboard de-watering equipment. Two Tern crewmembers went aboard to assist and were able to completely dewater the vessel. Two Sons was escorted to Pier 45 (San Francisco) and no injuries were reported.

On September 4, 2017,Tern's small boat crew rescued two women whose sailboat capsized near Richmond.

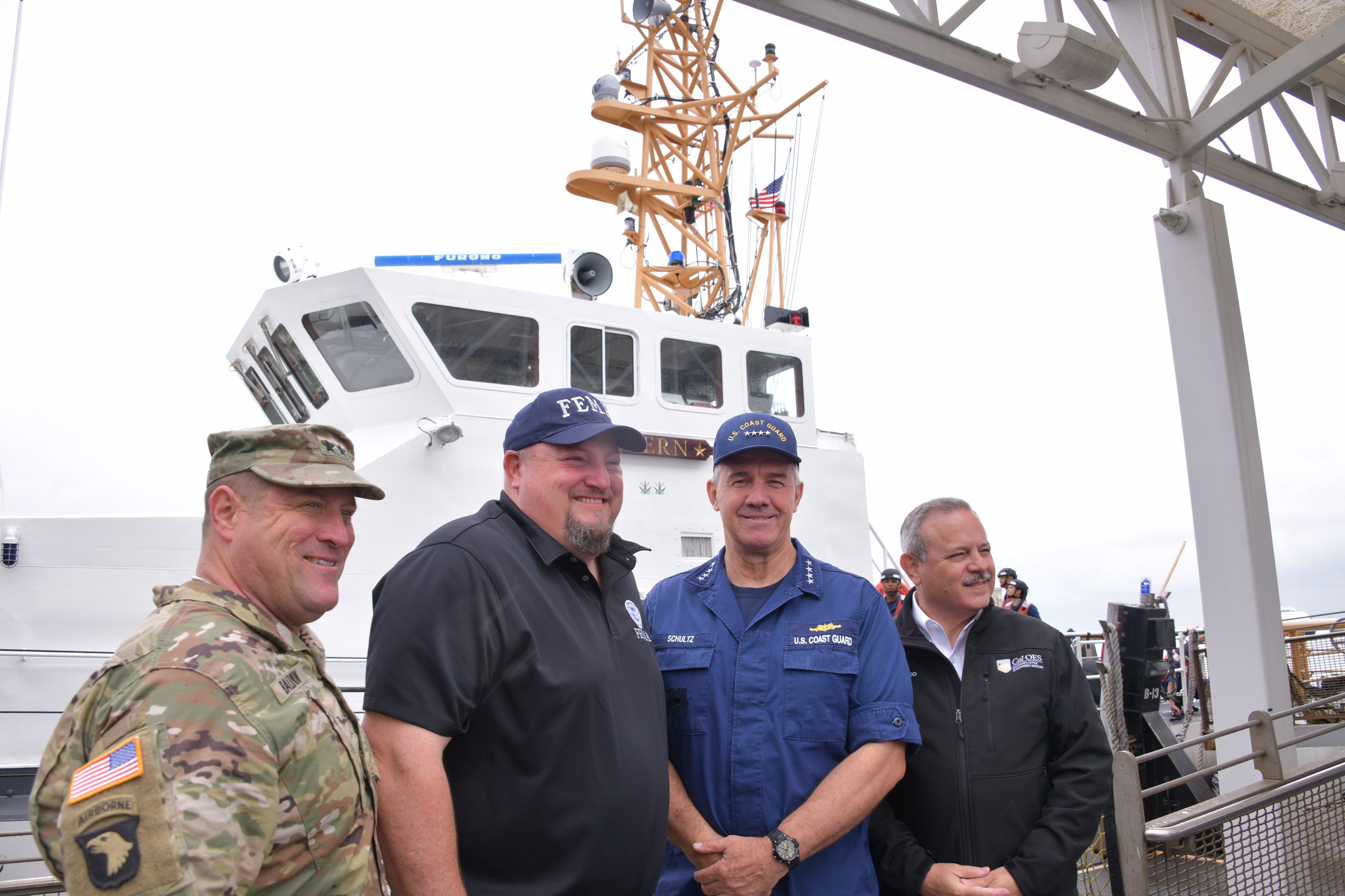

On May 15, 2019, Commandant of the Coast Guard, Admiral Karl L. Schultz, Federal Emergency Management Agency (FEMA) Region 9 administrator, Mr. Robert J. Fenton, California Office of Emergency Services director, Mr. Mark Ghilarducci, and representatives from local partner agencies met to discuss shared concerns and issues facing the complex maritime environment in and around the Bay Area while touring the Port of San Francisco aboard Tern.

On March 7, 2020, Tern transported a 70-year-old woman with a non-COVID-19 medical emergency and her husband from the quarantined Grand Princess cruise ship to awaiting emergency crews and Centers for Disease Control personnel at Sector San Francisco on Yerba Buena Island.

== See also ==
- List of United States Coast Guard cutters
