= USCGC Ouachita =

US Coast Guard buoy tender

History

United States
- Name: Ouachita
- Namesake: Ouachita River
- Ordered: 1950s
- Builder: Platzer Shipyard
- Launched: July 22, 1960
- Home port: Coast Guard Station Boston
- Status: In service

General characteristics
- Class & type: Ouachita-class buoy tender
- Displacement: 145 long tons (147 t)
- Length: 65 ft 10 in (20.07 m)
- Beam: 21 ft (6.4 m)
- Draft: 5 ft (1.5 m)
- Propulsion: 2 × diesel engines
- Speed: 8–10 knots (15–19 km/h; 9.2–11.5 mph)
- Complement: 16

USCGC Ouachita (WLR-65501) is a 65-foot (20 m) river buoy tender of the United States Coast Guard and is the lead ship of the Ouachita-class tender. She is homeported at Chattanooga, Tennessee and was delivered to the U.S. Coast Guard in 1960. She is tasked with maintaining aids to navigation (ATON) and provides search-and-rescue (SAR) support along 619 miles (996 km) of the Tennessee River and its many tributaries and adjourning rivers under Coast Guard Sector Ohio Valley. She is named for the Ouachita River, a major tributary of the Red River that flows through Arkansas and northeastern Louisiana.

== Design ==
Ouachita was built by Platzer Shipyard in Houston, Texas. Her hull was completed and delivered on July 22, 1960, with a length of 65 feet 10 inches (20.07 m) She has a 21-foot (6.4 m) beam, a draft of 5 feet (1.5 m), and a displacement of 145 long tons (147 t). The vessel is designed to work with and push a 130-foot (40 m) buoy barge which houses all necessary equipment for maintaining buoys, area for storing buoys, and a crane for lifting them. Her propulsion is provided by twin diesel engines capable of generating 660–750 horsepower (490–560 kW) driving two screws. The vessel has an operating speed of roughly 8 to 10 knots (15 to 19 km/h; 9.2 to 11.5 mph) and has a crew of 16 personnel. She does not typically have a mounted armament, but her crew carry standard department side arms and are trained in a variety of U.S. military weapons systems. Throughout the six decades of her service, she has received multiple upgrades and overhauls in order to keep her fit for her mission.

== Service ==
Since her delivery, she has been based in Chattanooga and maintains 354 lighted aids and day boards as well as roughly 1,700 buoys. The vessel is responsible for raising, inspecting, repairing or replacing, and repositioning the navigational aids. Her shallow draft allows her to reach difficult locations in shallow channels. Her service area includes:

- Tennessee River
- Clinch River
- Emory River
- Little River
- Tennessee-Tombigbee Waterway
- Sulphur creek
- Sod creek
- Piney River
