= USCGC Sea Fox =

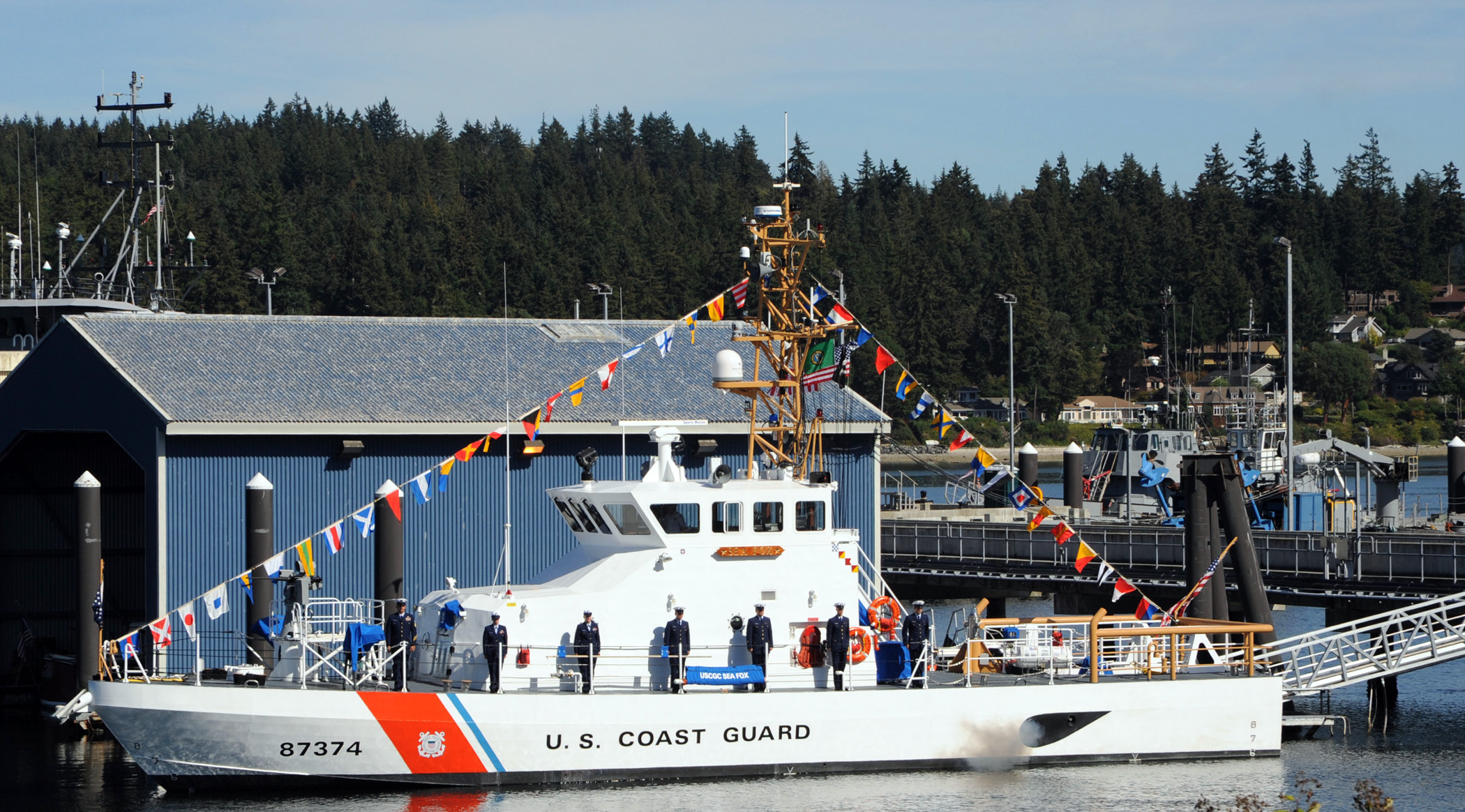
- Sea Fox at Naval Base Kitsap.

History

United States
- Name: USCGC Sea Fox
- Namesake: USS Sea Fox
- Builder: Bollinger Shipyards, Lockport, Louisiana
- Acquired: 2009
- Home port: Kings Bay, Georgia
- Identification: MMSI number: 369493434; Callsign: NOBO
- Motto: Semper Infensus
- Status: in active service

General characteristics
- Class & type: Marine Protector-class coastal patrol boat
- Displacement: 91 long tons (92 t)
- Length: 87 ft 0 in (26.5 m)
- Beam: 19 ft 5 in (5.9 m)
- Draft: 5 ft 7 in (1.7 m)
- Propulsion: 2 × MTU diesels
- Speed: 25 knots (46 km/h)
- Range: 900 nmi (1,700 km)
- Endurance: 5 days
- Complement: 10
- Armament: 3 × .50 caliber M2 Browning machine guns

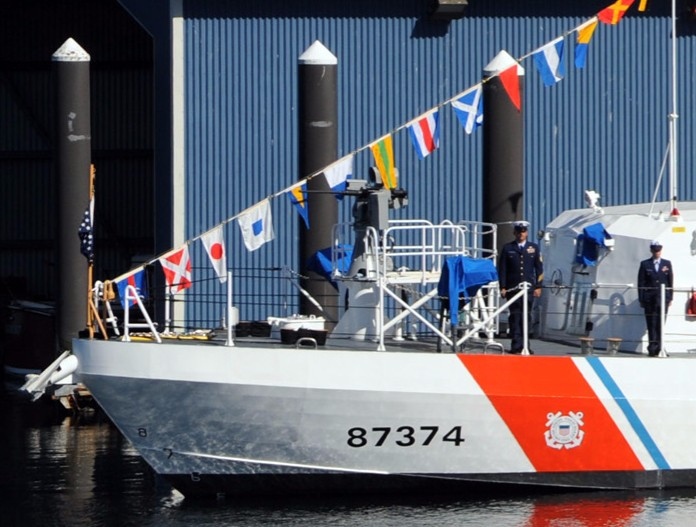
Unlike most other ships of her class, Sea Fox mounts a gyro-stabilized remote controlled machine gun.

USCGC Sea Fox (WPB-87374) was the last Marine Protector-class coastal patrol boat to be built. Her first home port was Bangor, Washington where she was part of the Coast Guard Maritime Force Protection Unit there, in company with her sister ship USCGC Sea Devil.

Unlike most cutters in her class she is owned by the United States Navy, although she is staffed by United States Coast Guard personnel. She and three of her sister ships (Sea Devil, Sea Dragon and Sea Dog) were employed to protect the Navy's largest submarines, the nuclear-armed Ohio class, while the submarines were in or near their moorings. These four cutters mounted an additional gyro-stabilized remotely controlled machine gun.

When Sea Dragon and Sea Dog, assigned to Coast Guard Maritime Force Protection Unit Kings Bay, were decommissioned on May 29, 2024, Sea Fox and Sea Devil replaced them.
