= USCGC Northland (WMEC-904) =

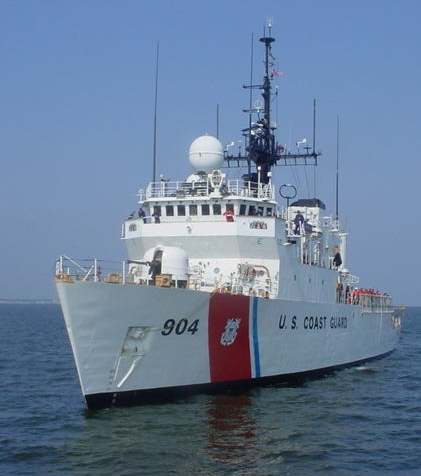
- USCGC Northland (WMEC-904)

History

United States
- Builder: Tacoma Boatbuilding Company, Tacoma, Washington
- Laid down: 1981
- Launched: 1982
- Commissioned: December 17, 1984
- Home port: Portsmouth, Virginia
- Identification: MMSI number: 367259000; Callsign: NLGF
- Motto: From Aztec Shore to Arctic Zone
- Status: In active service
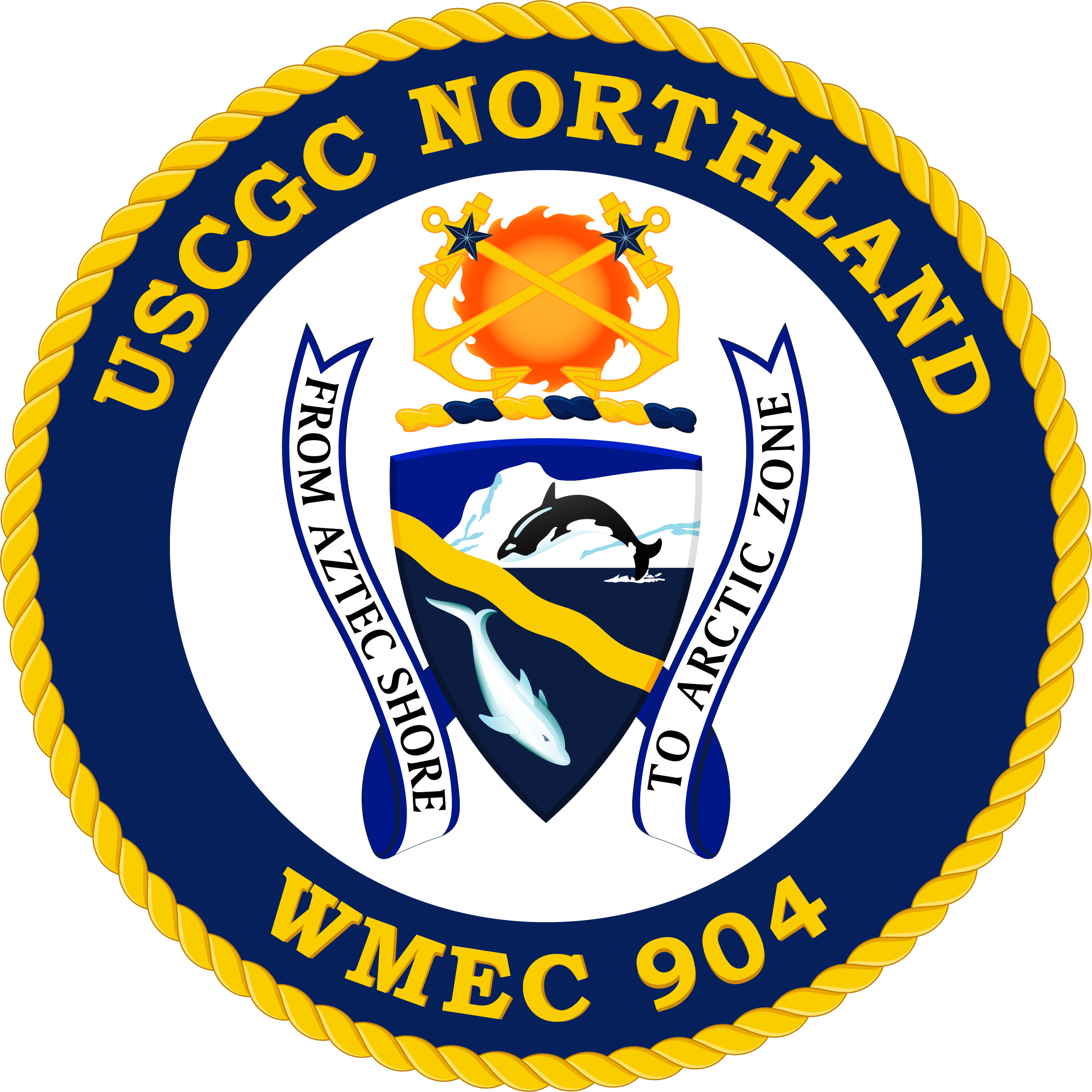
- Badge

General characteristics
- Displacement: 1,800 tons
- Length: 270 ft (82 m)
- Beam: 38 ft (12 m)
- Draught: 14.5 ft (4.4 m)
- Propulsion: Twin turbo-charged ALCO V-18 diesel engines
- Speed: 19.5 knots
- Range: 9,900 miles
- Complement: 100 personnel (14 officers, 86 enlisted)
- Electronic warfare & decoys: AN/SLQ-32A(V)2 MK 36 SRBOC
- Armament: 1 OTO Melara Mk 75 76 mm/62 caliber naval gun; 2 × .50 caliber (12.7 mm) machine gun
- Aircraft carried: HH-65 Dolphin; HH-60 Jayhawk; MH-68 Stingray

USCGC Northland (WMEC-904) is a United States Coast Guard medium endurance cutter. Her keel was laid down in 1981 and she was launched in 1982 by the Tacoma Boatbuilding Company of Tacoma, Washington. She was commissioned on December 17, 1984.

== History ==
The USCGC Northland is the second cutter to carry that name (she is named after USCGC Northland (WPG-49)) and the fourth of the thirteen Famous Class cutters currently serving in the 270 feet (82 m) medium endurance cutter fleet. Northland is home ported in Portsmouth, Virginia.

Northland has many missions including search and rescue, law enforcement and interdiction, homeland security, and defense operations. Northland's crew is composed of officers and enlisted personnel with a large variety of different Coast Guard rates. Northland's primary area of operation includes but is not limited to the Atlantic Ocean, the Caribbean Sea, and the Gulf of Mexico.

== Images ==
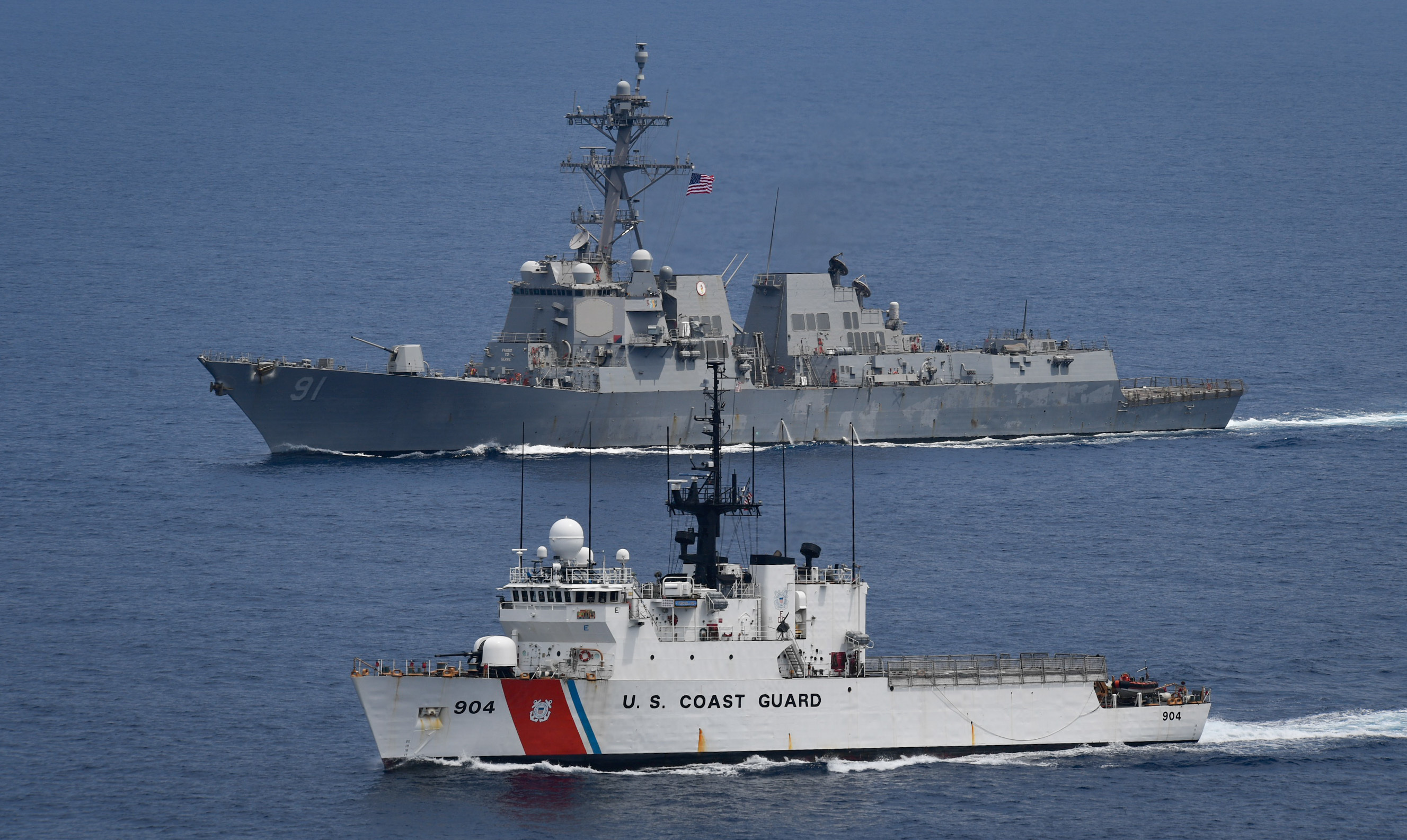
Pinckney and USCGC Northland train in the Pacific, April 2020

USCGC Northland crew returning from boarding

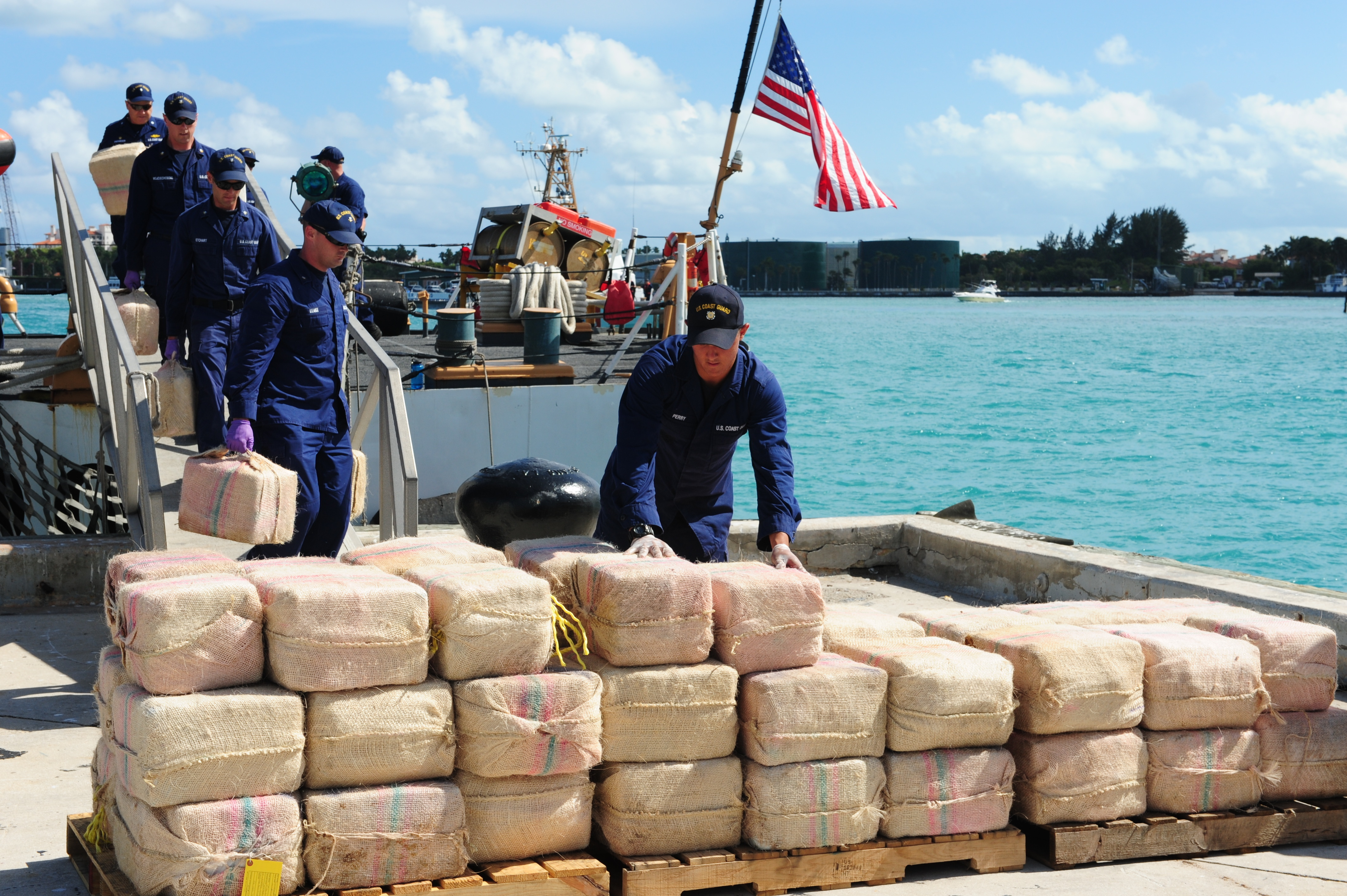
3,500 pounds of cocaine seized by USCGC Northland 2012
