= USCGC Tampa (WMEC-902) =

United States Coast Guard cutter

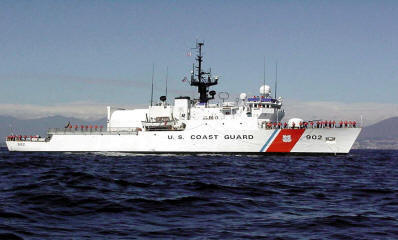
- USCGC Tampa (WMEC-902)

History

United States
- Builder: Tacoma Boatbuilding Company, Tacoma, Washington
- Christened: 16 March 1984
- Home port: Portsmouth, Virginia
- Identification: MMSI number: 367290000; Callsign: NIKL
- Motto: "Thy way is the sea, thy path in the great waters."
- Status: Active
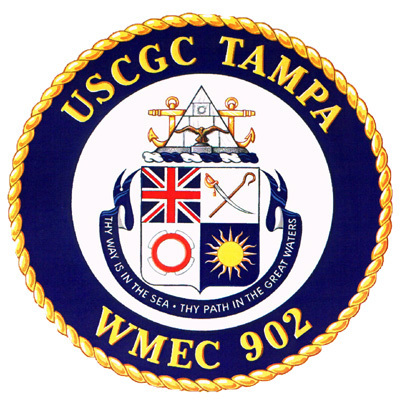
- Badge

General characteristics
- Displacement: 1,800 tons
- Length: 270 ft (82 m)
- Beam: 38 ft (12 m)
- Draught: 14.5 ft (4.4 m)
- Propulsion: Twin turbo-charged ALCO V-18 diesel engines
- Speed: 19.5 knots
- Range: 9,900 miles
- Complement: 100 personnel (14 officers, 86 enlisted)
- Electronic warfare & decoys: AN/SLQ-32A(V)2
- Armament: 1 OTO Melara Mk 75 76 mm/62 caliber naval gun; 2 × .50 caliber (12.7 mm) machine gun
- Aircraft carried: HH-65 Dolphin; HH-60 Jayhawk; MH-68 Stingray

USCGC Tampa (WMEC-902) is a United States Coast Guard medium endurance cutter. She was commissioned 16 March 1984. Her motto, "Thy way is the sea, thy path in the great waters", matches the inscription that is engraved on the memorial at Arlington National Cemetery for the 131 persons lost following the sinking of a previous cutter Tampa on 18 September 1918.

== Mission ==
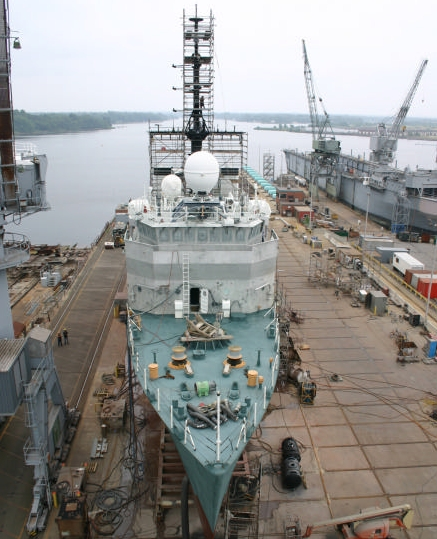
USCGC Tampa - undergoing refit.

As part of the "Legacy Fleet", Tampa recently underwent a nine-month Mission Effectiveness Project (MEP) at the United States Coast Guard Yard. MEP is designed to extend Tampa's operational life until the deployment of a new line of cutters from the Coast Guard's Deepwater Program. With current and future updates of Deepwater electronics systems, a unique computer system and a modern array of weapons, Tampa is dramatically different from the half-century old vessels it replaced.

Tampa is a multi-mission ship with five primary missions: maritime law enforcement, search and rescue, homeland security, national defense and international engagement.

SCCS-270 is a computer system that aids in controlling shipboard operations and reduces manning requirements. SCCS-270 receives information from multiple sources and displays it on several monitors on the bridge and in CIC (Combat Information Center). Operators use the displayed information primarily for navigation and to track other vessels and aircraft. This system also allows for the sharing of information with other vessels and commands via a satellite link.

Tampa operates primarily in the littoral waters of the United States and throughout the Caribbean to ensure homeland security and enforce immigration, fisheries, customs, and environmental laws, along with the more visible drug interdiction laws. Tampa is a front-line unit in the nation's "war on drugs" and has seized numerous drug smuggling vessels. In 1994, Tampa was involved with the rescue and return of several thousand Haitians and Cubans during mass migrations from these nations. In September 2005, following the devastating landfall of Hurricane Katrina along the Gulf Coast of the United States, The crew of the Tampa (on board the Harriet Lane) acted as gatekeeper to the mouth of the Mississippi ensuring the safety and movement of commerce from offshore. Tampa later moved upriver to ensure the safety and security of ports and waterways, and support rescue and recovery operations in downtown New Orleans.

Tampa is able to launch, land, and service the Coast Guard's HH-65 Dolphin and MH-68 Stingray helicopters. Safety of shipboard helicopter operations is enhanced with the use of Tampa's dynamic fin stabilizing system, which reduces the roll of the ship.

To maintain military readiness, Tampa conducts exercises with the U.S. Navy. This training, which includes ship's weapons exercises, damage control drills, and navigation exercises, ensures that Tampa remains a fully capable naval combatant in a time of war or other hostilities. In 2000, Tampa deployed to South America in support of U.S. Southern Command and participated in UNITAS 41-00, an annual naval exercise between U.S. and South American Forces. In 2004, Tampa deployed to the Mediterranean and Black Sea in support of U.S. European Command and conducted training with numerous friends and allies in the region.

In March 2014, the Tampa and the USCGC Richard Etheridge participated in Operation Martillo, an operation to seize illicit drugs.
