= USCG Activities Europe =

US Coast Guard base in Schinnen, Netherlands

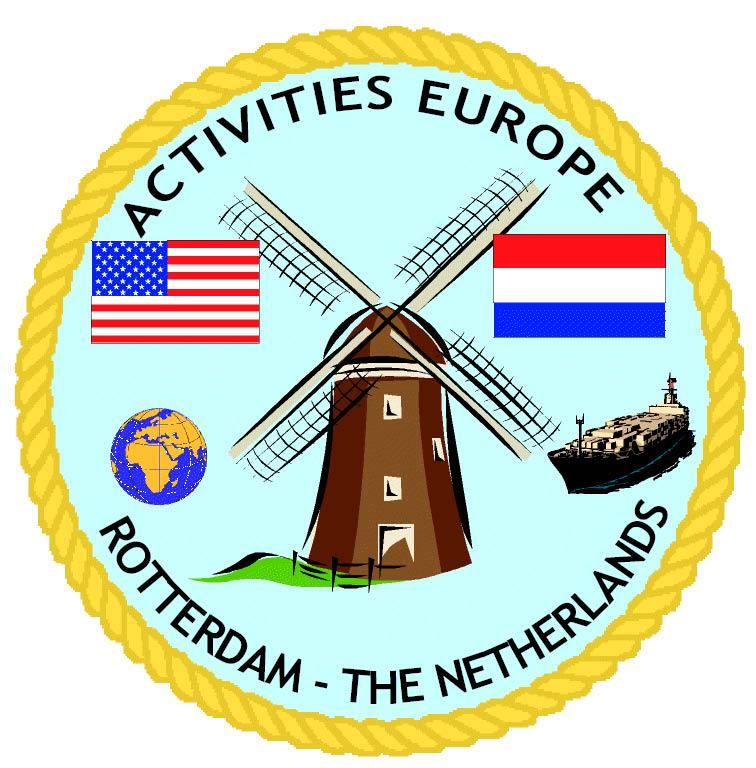
ACTEUR Logo

United States Coast Guard activities Europe (ACTEUR) is a Coast Guard Marine Safety unit located in Schinnen, Netherlands.

== Unit History ==
At the request of the U.S. Department of State, the U.S. Coast Guard (USCG) established offices throughout Europe near the end of World War II. Their mission was initially to handle the influx of U.S. merchant ships and merchant seaman. However, after the war, the workload declined and offices remained only in London, Bremerhaven and Rotterdam. In the 1960s the name Activities Europe (ACTEUR) was first given to the office in London and they were tasked as the centralized support for CG LORAN stations throughout Europe.

In 1975, the USCG offices were consolidated, and a Marine Inspection Office (MIO) was established in Rotterdam. This was the first MIO established outside of the U.S., and its mission was similar to that of the current unit. However, due to budgetary reasons, MIO Rotterdam was closed in June 1982, and the overseas inspection responsibilities in Europe, Africa, and the Middle East were transferred to MIO New York. From June 1982 to July 1995, MIO New York conducted overseas inspections using a combination of inspectors from the U.S. and personnel from ACTEUR London.

With the turn-over of the LORAN stations to the "host" countries in the early 1990s, ACTEUR London was closed. A new command, Activities/Marine Inspection Office Europe, was commissioned on July 11, 1995 in Rotterdam.

The unit has continued to grow and evolve during the Coast Guard's transition to the Department of Homeland Security and today our maritime security role continues to expand. Between 2004 and 2007, additional personnel were assigned to ACTEUR as International Port Security Liaison Officers (IPSLO). IPLSO's work with 83 countries to align maritime security efforts and share best practices.

In December 2012 the office was moved again as a tenant of U. S. Army Garrison Schinnen, in Schinnen Netherlands.

== Missions ==
- U.S. Flag Administration: In support of USCG Maritime Safety, Security & Environmental Protection missions, ACTEUR inspects and certifies the U.S. commercial vessel fleet operating throughout Europe, the Middle East & Africa. They also perform various oversight activities and investigate incidents involving the U.S. merchant fleet.
- Port State Control Activities: To ensure compliance with U.S. laws & regulations and applicable international conventions, ACTEUR examines foreign flag commercial vessels that have applied for permission to trade in the U.S., including cruise ships (checked during design and construction phases) and tankers (including self-propelled carriers of crude oil, petroleum products, chemicals and liquefied gases).
- International Port Security Program: To verify implementation of the International Ship and Port Facility Security Code (ISPS), ACTEUR performs bi-lateral information exchanges (including sharing best practices) and conducts visits at the foreign port facilities of America's maritime trading partner nations, thereby aligning security efforts and ensuring that adequate measures are in place.
- International Outreach and Engagement: In support of USCG strategic objectives, ACTEUR works with members of the international maritime community to promote and enhance the safety and security of the international maritime transportation system.

=== Flag Administration, Safety, Security, and Pollution Prevention For US Flag ===
U.S. Vessel Inspections – Safety, security, and environmental protection inspections on U.S. flag vessels account for the majority of their flag administration workload. The somewhat transient U.S. fleet that operates within the AOR includes offshore oil industry vessels and Mobile Offshore Drilling Units working in West Africa and on the North Sea and Arabian Sea, and U.S. deep draft cargo ships (both commercial and U.S. government owned), which navigate throughout the Area of Responsibility (AOR).

ACTEUR's marine inspectors focus on the structural integrity, vital systems, propulsion, seaworthiness, hazardous conditions, lifesaving, firefighting, safety of navigation, etc., on U.S flag commercial vessels. Their marine inspectors travel to over 30 countries throughout the AOR to ensure compliance with U.S. laws and regulations and international conventions.

In addition to the fleet in operation, ACTEUR also oversees any major U.S. flag new-building projects under construction within the AOR, prototype & production testing of primary lifesaving appliances for formal USCG Approval, and of third party organizations that have been authorized to conduct relevant work on behalf of the USCG.

U.S. Vessel Investigations - ACTEUR also investigates marine casualties (including incidents accidental or purposeful) involving U.S. vessels operating within the AOR. Primarily to identify safeguards and prevent re-occurrence, their investigators attempt to determine the causes, evaluate the actions of USCG licensed & documented mariners and, as appropriate, initiate legal actions.

=== Port State Control Activities ===
Although ACTEUR does not have Captain of the Port jurisdiction, they play a key role in the USCG Port State control program for European built cruise ships, foreign flag tank vessels and compressed gas carriers. The overwhelming majority of cruise ships that trade in the U.S. are built in European shipyards and ACTEUR marine inspectors, working in conjunction with U.S. counterparts, often conduct expanded Port State Control exams during the construction of these vessels in order to ensure compliance with international safety regulations, especially those concerning structural fire protection and lifesaving arrangements.

=== International Port Security Program ===
In 2004 ACTEUR became home to a team of International Port Security Liaison Officers (IPSLO's) who work with all maritime trading countries in the AOR. The IPSLOs are a vital part of the Coast Guard's International Port Security (IPS) Program. Their mission is to learn about maritime port security efforts and implementation of the ISPS Code in all countries that conduct maritime trade with the U.S.

This is accomplished by continual engagement with fellow maritime nations. At times engagements are less formal and conducted by the IPSLO alone and other times more formal and include a delegation of IPS Program managers from Washington DC or Portsmouth, Virginia. In all cases, engagements provide the opportunity to conduct on-site information exchanges, share best practices, and observe each country's efforts on maritime port security. IPSLO's also facilitate visits to the U.S. allowing other nation's port security personnel to observe security practices in U.S. ports.

== Statistics ==
- There are over 6,500 miles between two of ACTEUR's regular inspection locations; Bergen, Norway, and Cape Town, South Africa.
- In 2007, ACTEUR personnel traveled to over 70 countries throughout the AOR carrying out our various mission responsibilities.
- ACTEUR has the largest geographic Area of Responsibility of any field unit in the USCG, spanning the Arctic Circle to Cape Horn.
