= Kings Bay Base, Georgia =

- Unincorporated community Census-designated place
- Location in Camden County and the state of Georgia
- Coordinates: 30°47′53″N 81°33′54″W
- Country: United States
- State: Georgia
- County: Camden

Area
  - Total: 2.81 sq mi (7.28 km^{2})
  - Land: 2.74 sq mi (7.10 km^{2})
  - Water: 0.069 sq mi (0.18 km^{2})
- Elevation: 20 ft (6.1 m)

Population (2020)
  - Total: 2,329
  - Density: 849.0/sq mi (327.81/km^{2})
- Time zone: UTC-5 (Eastern (EST))
  - Summer (DST): UTC-4 (EDT)
- ZIP code: 31547
- Area code: 912
- FIPS code: 13-43580

Kings Bay Base is an unincorporated community and census-designated place (CDP) in Camden County, Georgia, United States; it is home to the Kings Bay Naval Submarine Base. The population was 2,329 at the 2020 census, up from 1,777 at the 2010 census. It is part of the Kingsland, Georgia Micropolitan Statistical Area.

== Geography ==
Kings Bay Base is located in southeastern Camden County at 30°47′53″N 81°33′54″W (30.798022, -81.564966). It is bordered to the west by the city of St. Marys.

According to the United States Census Bureau, the CDP has a total area of 2.81 square miles (7.28 km^{2}), of which 0.069 square miles (0.18 km^{2}), or 2.47%, is water.

== Demographics ==
Historical population
Census	Pop.	Note	%±
1990	3,463		—
2000	2,599		−24.9%
2010	1,777		−31.6%
2020	2,329		31.1%
U.S. Decennial Census; 1850–1870 1870–1880; 1890–1910 1920–1930; 1940 1950 1960; 1970 1980 1990; 2000 2010 2020

Kings Bay Base was first listed as a CDP in the 1990 U.S. census.

=== Racial and ethnic composition ===
Kings Bay Base CDP, Georgia – Racial and ethnic composition Note: the US Census treats Hispanic/Latino as an ethnic category. This table excludes Latinos from the racial categories and assigns them to a separate category. Hispanics/Latinos may be of any race.
Race / Ethnicity (NH = Non-Hispanic)	Pop 2000	Pop 2010	Pop 2020	% 2000	% 2010	% 2020
White alone (NH)	1,800	1,284	1,499	69.26%	72.26%	64.36%
Black or African American alone (NH)	518	188	267	19.93%	10.58%	11.46%
Native American or Alaska Native alone (NH)	12	9	5	0.46%	0.51%	0.21%
Asian alone (NH)	20	22	49	0.77%	1.24%	2.10%
Pacific Islander alone (NH)	1	5	12	0.04%	0.28%	0.52%
Some Other Race alone (NH)	4	1	1	0.15%	0.06%	0.04%
Mixed Race or Multi-Racial (NH)	36	67	109	1.39%	3.77%	4.68%
Hispanic or Latino (any race)	208	201	387	8.00%	11.31%	16.62%
Total	2,599	1,777	2,329	100.00%	100.00%	100.00%

=== 2020 census ===
As of the 2020 census, Kings Bay Base had a population of 2,329. The median age was 21.8 years. 18.8% of residents were under the age of 18 and 0.9% of residents were 65 years of age or older. For every 100 females there were 222.6 males, and for every 100 females age 18 and over there were 275.2 males age 18 and over.

97.0% of residents lived in urban areas, while 3.0% lived in rural areas.

There were 461 households in Kings Bay Base, of which 46.0% had children under the age of 18 living in them. Of all households, 62.5% were married-couple households, 21.7% were households with a male householder and no spouse or partner present, and 14.1% were households with a female householder and no spouse or partner present. About 26.7% of all households were made up of individuals and 1.8% had someone living alone who was 65 years of age or older.

There were 608 housing units, of which 24.2% were vacant. The homeowner vacancy rate was 33.3% and the rental vacancy rate was 21.0%.

=== 2010 census ===
In 2010, its population declined to 1,777.

=== 2000 census ===
At the 2000 census, there were 2,599 people, 429 households, and 425 families residing in the CDP.

== Education ==
=== Higher education ===
Valdosta State University and Brenau University formerly operated satellite campuses on the Kings Bay Naval Submarine Base within the CDP, serving military personnel, their families, and the surrounding community. Brenau closed its Kings Bay campus in 2016 after the base's higher-education policies changed to favor larger institutions. Valdosta State subsequently relocated its program off-base to the Camden Center in nearby Kingsland.
