= USCGC Bear (WMEC-901) =

American Coast Guard vessel

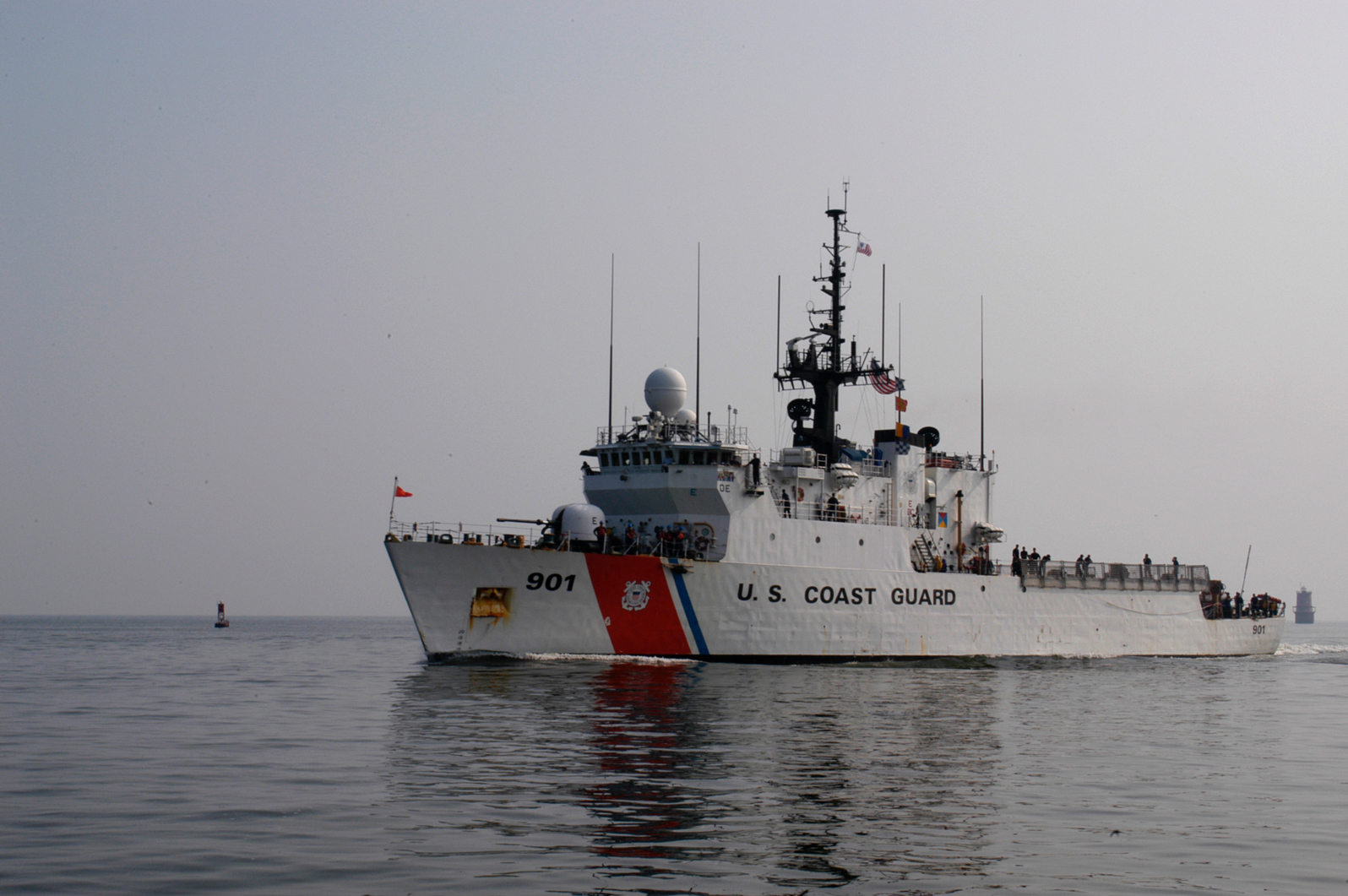
- USCGC Bear (WMEC-901)

History

United States
- Builder: Tacoma Boatbuilding Company, Tacoma, Washington
- Laid down: August 23, 1979
- Launched: September 25, 1980
- Commissioned: February 4, 1983
- Home port: Portsmouth, Virginia
- Identification: MMSI number: 367286000; Callsign: NRKN
- Motto: Summa Potentia Per Facilitatem; Highest might / ability through willingness.
- Status: Active
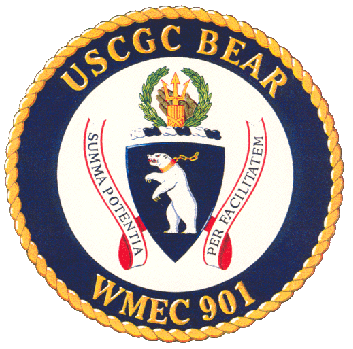
- Badge

General characteristics
- Displacement: 1,800 tons
- Length: 270 ft (82 m)
- Beam: 38 ft (12 m)
- Draught: 14.5 ft (4.4 m)
- Propulsion: Twin turbo-charged ALCO V-18 diesel engines
- Speed: 20.5 knots (38.0 km/h; 23.6 mph)
- Range: 9,900 mi (15,900 km)
- Complement: 100 personnel (14 officers, 86 enlisted)
- Sensors & processing systems: FCS MK 92 Mod 1; SPS-78 surface search radar
- Electronic warfare & decoys: AN/SLQ-32A(V)2 2 x Mark 36 SRBOC
- Armament: 1 × OTO Melara Mark 75 76 mm/62-caliber naval gun; 2 × .50-caliber (12.7 mm) machine guns
- Aircraft carried: HH-65 Dolphin
- Aviation facilities: Helipad and Hangar

USCGC Bear (WMEC-901) is a United States Coast Guard medium endurance cutter. She was laid down August 23, 1979 and launched September 25, 1980 by the Tacoma Boatbuilding Company of Tacoma, Washington. She was commissioned February 4, 1983. She was named for USRC Bear (AG-29), a steam barquentine that was built in Scotland and served the United States Treasury Department in the United States Revenue Cutter Service's Alaskan Patrol.

== History ==
In 1986, Bear responded to the Space Shuttle Challenger disaster by searching over 1900 square nautical miles (6,500 km²). During any given patrol, Bear conducts a wide-spectrum of missions such as search and rescue, alien migrant interdiction operations, counter-drug patrols, fisheries enforcement, and international engagement—illustrating the versatile, multi-mission character of the Coast Guard and the cutter fleet. Since her commissioning she has made 25 significant drug seizures involving 12 marijuana and 13 cocaine busts. According to the Office of Maritime Law Enforcement, in 2023, Bear set the record for most interdictions in one deployment in which the crew stopped 6 go-fasts, preventing 8,500 pounds of cocaine from reaching the U.S. and keeping $90M out of the hands of criminals.

In 1999, Bear was deployed with the USS Theodore Roosevelt (CVN-71) Battle Group to support NATO combat operations during Operation Allied Force. During this the Bear performed various mission such as surface surveillance, provided backup Search and Rescue response, combat escort for US Army transport vessels in areas where the cutter was well within range of enemy missiles, and provided force protection for the Amphibious Ready Group operating near Albania. Vice Admiral Murphy stated how well and how seamlessly Bear and her crew performed naval operations. This was due to the Bear's interoperability, crew training and knowledge in naval warfare and naval war fighting doctrine, and adequate weaponry. Bear was awarded the Kosovo Campaign Medal and the NATO Kosovo Medal. In 2023, Bear's NR1 Main Diesel Engine clocked 100,000 hours, a testament to the dedication and skill of Coast Guard engineers. As of Spring 2024, Bear has deployed 74 times since launch.
