= USCGC Alert (WMEC-630) =

US Coast Guard vessel

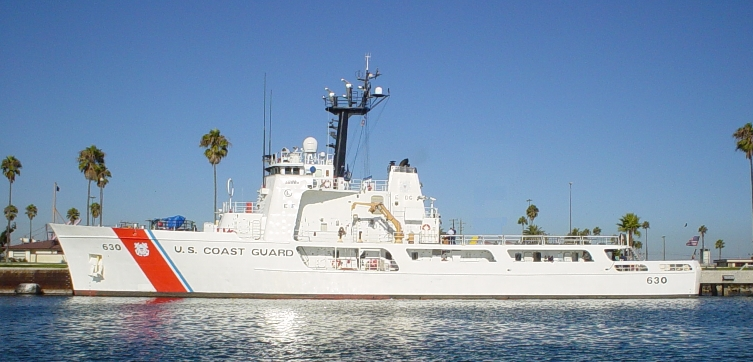
- USCGC Alert (WMEC-630)

History

United States
- Builder: United States Coast Guard Yard, Curtis Bay, Maryland
- Laid down: 5 January 1968
- Commissioned: 4 August 1969
- Home port: Port Canaveral, Florida
- Identification: MMSI number: 367299000; Callsign: NZVE
- Motto: Rescue, Enforce, Defend
- Status: In active service

General characteristics
- Displacement: 759 tons
- Length: 210 ft 6 in (64.16 m)
- Beam: 34 ft (10 m)
- Draught: 10 ft 6 in (3.20 m) max
- Propulsion: 2 x V16 2550 horsepower ALCO diesel engines
- Speed: max 18 knots; 2,700 mile range
- Range: cruise 14 knots; 6,100 mile range
- Complement: 12 officers, 63 enlisted
- Sensors & processing systems: 2 x AN/SPS-78
- Armament: 1 × Mk 38 25mm machine gun; 2 × M2HB .50 caliber machine gun
- Aircraft carried: HH-65 Dolphin

USCGC Alert (WMEC-630) is a United States Coast Guard medium endurance cutter and is the last 210-foot (64 m) medium endurance cutter constructed. The keel was laid on 5 January 1968 at the United States Coast Guard Yard at Curtis Bay, Maryland, and she was commissioned on Coast Guard Day, 4 August 1969. Alert derives her name from the early 19th century revenue cutter USRC Alert, which served in the early days of the Revenue Cutter Service.
