= Maritime Force Protection Unit =

U.S coast guard unit

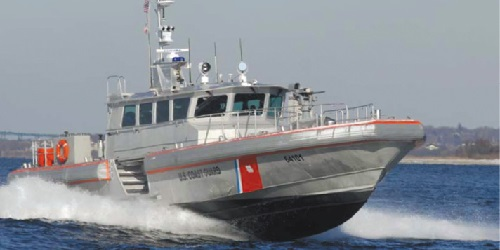
A MFPU boat pictured in 2016.

A Maritime Force Protection Unit (MFPU) is a U.S. Coast Guard special unit tasked with the protection of U.S. Navy ballistic missile submarines (SSBN) while surfaced and transiting U.S. territorial waters to and from their patrol stations.

Maritime Force Protection Units have approximately 150 personnel and are "single-mission" units, meaning they have no other responsibilities other than the defense of SSBNs.

As of 2017, there were two Maritime Force Protection units, both of which were activated in 2007. The first, Maritime Force Protection Unit Kings Bay, is based at Naval Submarine Base Kings Bay; a second, Maritime Force Protection Unit Bangor, is based at Naval Submarine Base Bangor.
