= USCGC Shearwater =

United States Coast Guard patrol boat

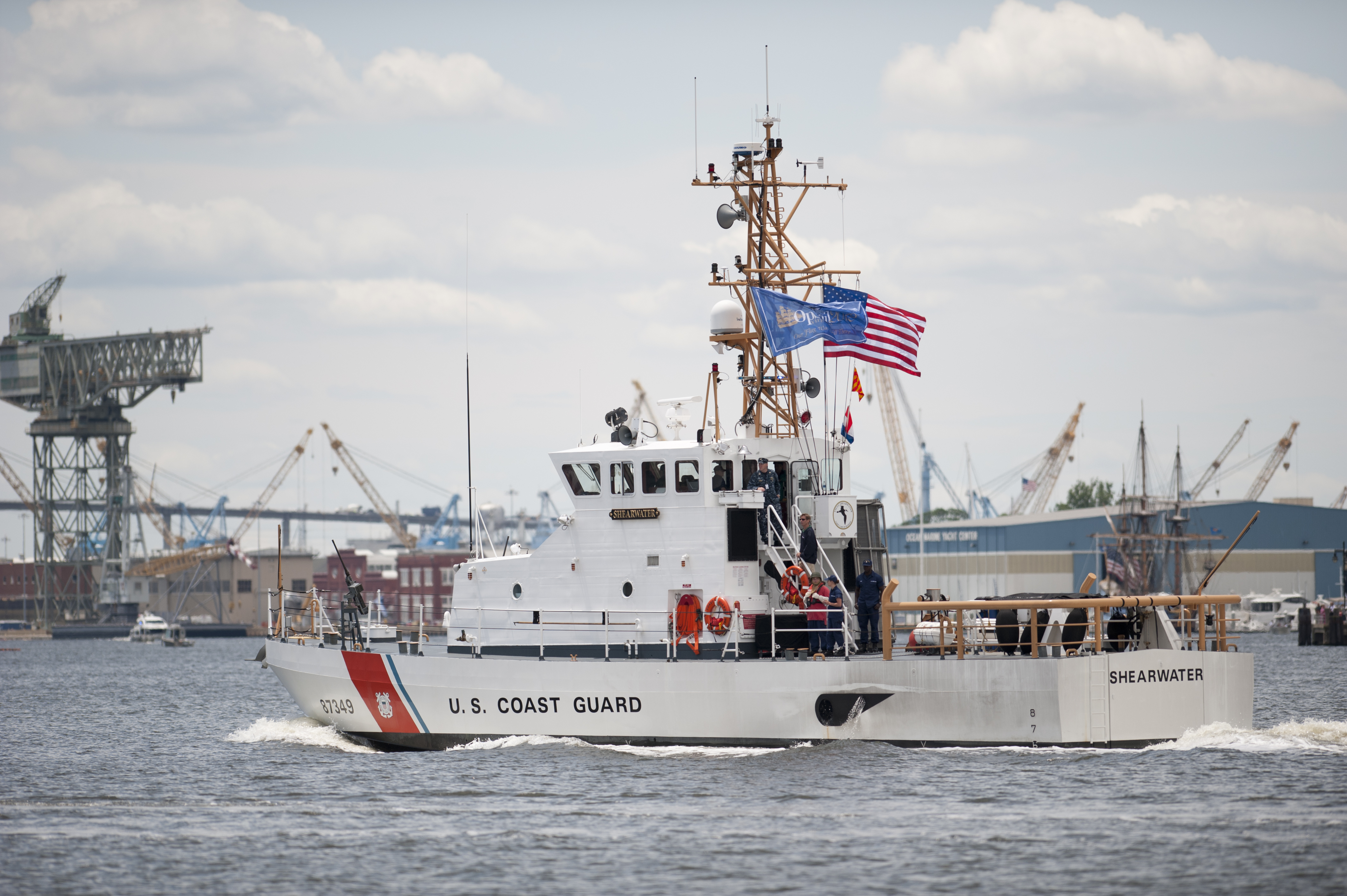
- Shearwater leads the Parade of Ships on the Elizabeth River during OpSail 2012

History

United States
- Name: Shearwater
- Namesake: Shearwater
- Operator: United States Coast Guard
- Builder: Bollinger Shipyards, Lockport, Louisiana
- Laid down: April 30, 2002
- Launched: August 6, 2002
- Commissioned: October 5, 2002
- Decommissioned: April 15, 2021
- Home port: Portsmouth, Virginia (2002–2018); Cape May, New Jersey (2018–2021)
- Identification: Hull number: WPB-87349
- Motto: "Takin' Care of Business"
- Nickname(s): "Queen of the Cape"
- Fate: Transferred to Lebanon

General characteristics
- Class & type: Marine Protector-class patrol boat
- Length: 87 ft (27 m)
- Complement: 12 (2021)

USCGC Shearwater (WPB-87349) is a former 87-foot (27 m) Marine Protector-class patrol boat of the United States Coast Guard. Commissioned in October 2002, it was based at Coast Guard Base Portsmouth in Portsmouth, Virginia, from 2002 to 2018 and then at Coast Guard Training Center Cape May in New Jersey. After 19 years of service it was decommissioned in April 2021. It was later transferred to the Lebanese Navy.

== Design ==
Shearwater is one of the Marine Protector-class coastal patrol boats built for the Coast Guard by Bollinger Shipyards of Lockport, Louisiana, under a contract first awarded on March 13, 1996. The class replaced the older 82-foot Point-class cutters.

== Service history ==
From 2002 to 2018 Shearwater was homeported at Coast Guard Base Portsmouth in the Hampton Roads area of Virginia. On June 6, 2012, it led the Parade of Ships through the Elizabeth River for OpSail 2012 Virginia, ahead of ships from the U.S. Navy, the Coast Guard and other agencies. On June 25, 2015, Shearwater and two other Hampton Roads patrol boats, Sea Horse and Cochito, changed commanding officers in a joint ceremony at Sector Hampton Roads.

Shearwater moved to Cape May in 2018, where a Coast Guard Auxiliary member nicknamed it "the Queen of the Cape". On August 13, 2020, the Marine Mammal Stranding Center asked the Coast Guard for help with an endangered sea turtle caught in a fishing trap line about 11 miles (18 km) southeast of Cape May. When Shearwater arrived, its crew saw sharks circling the turtle. A team in the cutter's small boat circled the turtle until the sharks left, then cut it free. The officer in charge, Master Chief Petty Officer Anthony Martinez, called it "the proudest day I've had on this cutter". In its last year of service, the crew also towed a disabled fishing vessel for 18 hours from 70 nautical miles (130 km) east of Cape Charles, Virginia.

=== Decommissioning ===
Shearwater was decommissioned on April 15, 2021, at Training Center Cape May, in a ceremony led by Captain Jonathan Theel, commander of Coast Guard Sector Delaware Bay. At the time it was one of 70 Marine Protector-class boats left in the Coast Guard.

== Lebanese Navy ==
In May 2021 the United States Department of Defense told Lebanon that it planned to deliver three Marine Protector-class patrol boats to the Lebanese Navy. In early 2022 Lebanese naval personnel trained aboard two U.S. Coast Guard boats at the Beirut Naval Base to prepare for the donation. The former Shearwater became one of the three, with the Lebanese hull number 2703.

== See also ==
- List of United States Coast Guard cutters
