= USCGC Beluga =

United States Coast Guard patrol boat

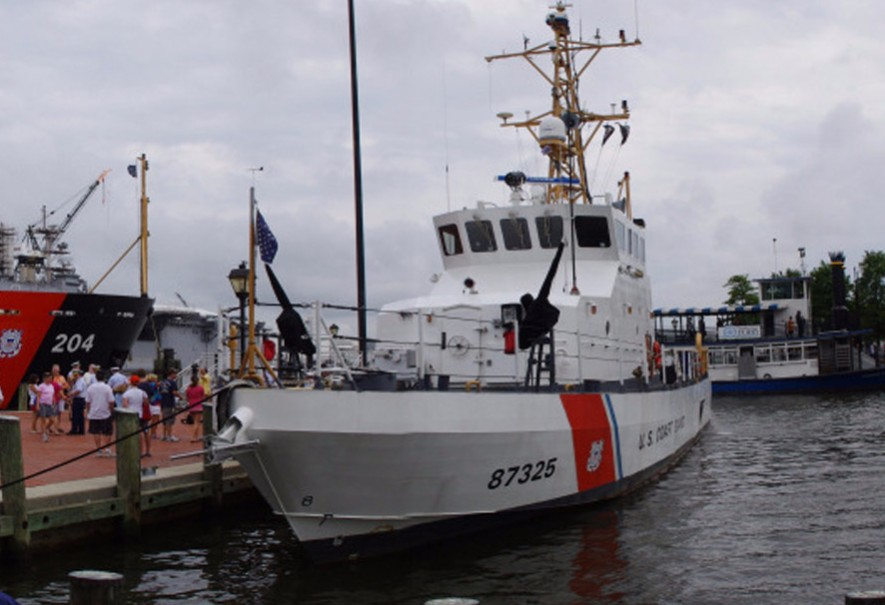
- Beluga at Portsmouth, Virginia, during the Coast Guard's 221st birthday celebrations, August 2011

History

United States
- Name: Beluga
- Namesake: Beluga whale
- Operator: United States Coast Guard
- Builder: Bollinger Shipyards, Lockport, Louisiana
- Launched: July 25, 2000
- Commissioned: November 21, 2000
- Home port: Little Creek, Virginia (2000s–2010s); Sandy Hook, New Jersey (by 2021)
- Identification: Hull number: WPB-87325
- Status: In active service

General characteristics
- Class & type: Marine Protector-class patrol boat
- Length: 87 ft (27 m)
- Complement: 11 (2011)

USCGC Beluga (WPB-87325) is an 87-foot (27 m) Marine Protector-class of the United States Coast Guard. Commissioned in November 2000, in the 2000s and early 2010s it was based at Joint Expeditionary Base–Little Creek in Virginia Beach, Virginia. It provided waterway security in Washington, D.C., on the 2004 National Day of Mourning for former President Ronald Reagan and led the 2011 Norfolk Harborfest Parade of Sail. By 2021 it was based at Sandy Hook, New Jersey.

== Design ==
Beluga is one of the Marine Protector-class coastal patrol boats built for the Coast Guard by Bollinger Shipyards of Lockport, Louisiana, under a contract first awarded on March 13, 1996. The class replaced the older 82-foot Point-class cutters. Beluga was launched on July 25, 2000. It entered service in a special commissioning on October 3, 2000, and was fully commissioned on November 21, 2000.

== Service history ==
On June 11, 2004, the National Day of Mourning for former President Ronald Reagan, Beluga, then listed as homeported in Norfolk, patrolled the Potomac River just above the Woodrow Wilson Bridge at Alexandria, Virginia. Coast Guard and Coast Guard Auxiliary boats from the Washington area worked with it on the security patrols.

On June 10, 2011, Beluga, homeported at Joint Expeditionary Base Little Creek–Fort Story, led the Parade of Sail at the 35th annual Norfolk Harborfest. On August 6, 2011, it was on display in Portsmouth, Virginia, during celebrations of the Coast Guard's 221st birthday.

By 2021 Beluga had moved to Sandy Hook in New Jersey.

== See also ==
- Marine Protector-class patrol boat
- List of United States Coast Guard cutters
