= USCGC Hawksbill =

United States Coast Guard patrol boat

- Hawksbill in July 2008

History

United States
- Name: Hawksbill
- Namesake: Hawksbill sea turtle
- Operator: United States Coast Guard
- Builder: Bollinger Shipyards, Lockport, Louisiana
- Completed: 1998
- Home port: Monterey, California
- Identification: Hull number: WPB-87312
- Status: In active service

General characteristics
- Class & type: Marine Protector-class patrol boat
- Length: 87 ft (27 m)

USCGC Hawksbill (WPB-87312) is an 87-foot (27 m) Marine Protector-class patrol boat of the United States Coast Guard, based in Monterey, California at Coast Guard Station Monterey. Built in 1998, it is one of the patrol boats assigned to Coast Guard Sector San Francisco. It patrols Monterey Bay and the coast of Northern California and regularly works in San Francisco Bay. Its missions include search and rescue and maritime law enforcement.

== Design ==
Hawksbill is one of the Marine Protector-class coastal patrol boats built for the Coast Guard by Bollinger Shipyards of Lockport, Louisiana, under a contract first awarded on March 13, 1996. The class replaced the older 82-foot Point-class cutters. Hawksbill was built in 1998.

== Service history ==
=== Sector San Francisco ===
By October 1999 Hawksbill was homeported in Monterey. In 2010 it was one of four 87-foot patrol boats assigned to Sector San Francisco, along with Tern, Pike and Sockeye. The four boats carried out the Coast Guard's maritime law enforcement missions in and around San Francisco Bay.

=== Search and rescue ===
On June 29, 2014, David Herrigel radioed the Coast Guard at about 4:30 a.m. after the rudder of his 30-foot (9.1 m) sailboat Domino broke off about 150 miles (240 km) off Monterey. He was taking part in the Singlehanded TransPac race from San Francisco to Hawaii, which had begun the day before. Hawksbill was sent to find him and ultimately towed the Domino in.

On the evening of August 20, 2019, one of two Beechcraft BE-36 planes flying together went down in the water about 9 miles (14 km) south of Pillar Point Harbor in Half Moon Bay. The Coast Guard sent a helicopter from Air Station San Francisco, diverted a C-27 Spartan aircraft and sent Hawksbill. The helicopter arrived on scene at about 6:20 p.m. and hoisted both people aboard. Neither was injured.

== See also ==
- List of United States Coast Guard cutters
