= USCGC Swordfish =

United States Coast Guard patrol boat

- Swordfish performs security while members of the Blue Angels perform overhead.

History

United States
- Name: Swordfish
- Namesake: Swordfish
- Operator: United States Coast Guard
- Builder: Bollinger Shipyards, Lockport, Louisiana
- Launched: December 27, 2004
- Commissioned: July 23, 2005
- Home port: Port Angeles, Washington
- Identification: Hull number: WPB-87358
- Status: In active service

General characteristics
- Class & type: Marine Protector-class patrol boat
- Length: 87 ft (27 m)

Swordfish escorts the aircraft carrier USS Nimitz off Seattle in January 2015

USCGC Swordfish (WPB-87358) is an 87-foot (27 m) Marine Protector-class of the United States Coast Guard, based in Port Angeles, Washington. It was commissioned in 2005 and its crews have worked across Puget Sound and the San Juan Islands. Its missions include maritime law enforcement, search and rescue and protecting living marine resources such as endangered species.

== Design ==
Swordfish is one of the Marine Protector-class coastal patrol boats built for the Coast Guard by Bollinger Shipyards of Lockport, Louisiana, under a contract first awarded on March 13, 1996. The class replaced the older 82-foot Point-class cutters. Swordfish was launched on December 27, 2004, and entered service in a special commissioning on March 8, 2005.

== Service history ==
Swordfish is one of several 87-foot patrol boats based at Port Angeles, along with the patrol boats Adelie and Wahoo. Its crew has patrolled alongside Coast Guard helicopters near a Canadian lighthouse.

On January 13, 2015, Swordfish escorted the aircraft carrier USS Nimitz as it shifted homeport from Naval Station Everett to Naval Base Kitsap–Bremerton.

In August 2015, while on patrol near President Channel in the San Juan Islands, the crew spotted a 20-foot (6.1 m) pleasure boat and found 24 kilograms (53 lb) of ecstasy aboard, with an estimated street value of $1 million. The boat's operator was turned over to federal authorities.

In February 2017 Swordfish returned to Port Angeles after an oil spill in its own engine room, with a response boat from Station Port Angeles alongside.

On the morning of June 24, 2021, a person stole the Argosy Cruises tour boat Beaver from its dock in Seattle and headed north, later threatening by radio that he had explosives and hostages. Swordfish was diverted to the scene along with response boats from Stations Port Angeles and Seattle. The stolen boat was brought back to shore in Seattle that afternoon.

On August 13, 2022, the 49-foot (15 m) fishing vessel Aleutian Isle began taking on water near Sunset Point and sank west of San Juan Island. Swordfish responded along with a helicopter from Air Station Port Angeles and a response boat from Station Bellingham. After the crew members were accounted for, the Coast Guard began a pollution response. The wreck, lying about 200 feet (61 m) down, had about 2,500 US gallons (9,500 L) of diesel fuel aboard and left an oil sheen nearly 2 miles (3.2 km) long.

== See also ==
- List of United States Coast Guard cutters
