= USCGC Chinook =

United States Coast Guard patrol boat

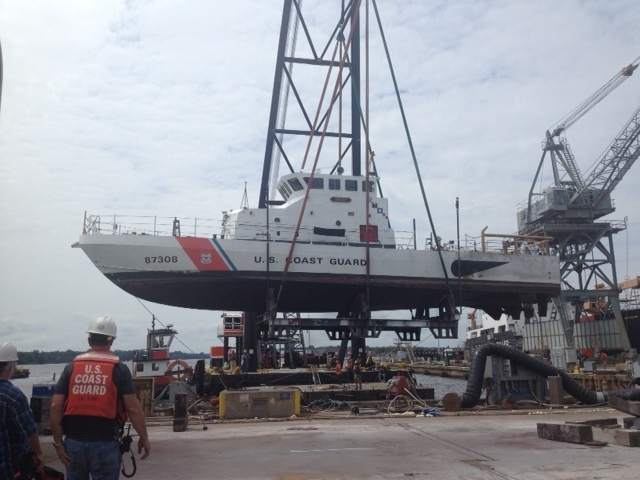
- Chinook is lifted from the water at the Coast Guard Yard in Baltimore for maintenance, August 2015

History

United States
- Name: Chinook
- Namesake: Chinook salmon
- Operator: United States Coast Guard
- Builder: Bollinger Shipyards, Lockport, Louisiana
- Home port: New London, Connecticut (until 2015); Corpus Christi, Texas (by 2020)
- Identification: Hull number: WPB-87308
- Status: In active service

General characteristics
- Class & type: Marine Protector-class patrol boat
- Length: 87 ft (27 m)

USCGC Chinook (WPB-87308) is an 87-foot (27 m) Marine Protector-class patrol boat of the United States Coast Guard. By 2003 it was based at New London, Connecticut, and it patrolled as far as Rhode Island. In 2015 it was replaced at New London by its sister ship Albacore as part of the Coast Guard's "Bow-to-Stern" maintenance program. By 2020 it was based in Corpus Christi, Texas, where its crew helped keep foreign fishing boats from poaching fish stocks along the maritime boundary between the United States and Mexico.

== Design ==
Chinook is one of the Marine Protector-class coastal patrol boats built for the Coast Guard by Bollinger Shipyards of Lockport, Louisiana, under a contract first awarded on March 13, 1996. The class replaced the older 82-foot Point-class cutters.

== Service history ==
=== New London ===
On December 3, 2003, while on a routine patrol, Chinook broke free from its mooring line at about 8:30 a.m. and ran aground near Coddington Cove, Rhode Island, where it had moored for the night. Two 41-foot (12 m) rescue boats from Coast Guard Station Castle Hill in Newport were sent to limit any environmental damage and to help work out how to refloat the cutter.

On August 19, 2015, Chinook was lifted out of the water at the Coast Guard Yard in Baltimore to begin 60 days of planned maintenance under the Coast Guard's 87-foot "Bow-to-Stern" program. The repairs were carried out under a climate-controlled, plastic-wrapped scaffold so that work could continue in summer heat and storms. On the same day the yard returned Albacore to service, and Albacore took Chinook's place at New London.

=== Corpus Christi ===
By 2020 Chinook was based at the Coast Guard Harbor Facility in Corpus Christi. On May 20, 2020, its crew used the cutter's small boat to carry out vessel boardings during National Safe Boating Week. On July 2, 2020, Senior Chief Petty Officer Derek Campbell relieved Master Chief Petty Officer Lawrence Dean as officer in charge. The Coast Guard noted the cutter's role in preventing unregulated foreign fishing vessels from poaching threatened fish stocks along the U.S.–Mexico maritime boundary.

On August 21, 2020, the dredge Waymon L Boyd caught fire in the Port of Corpus Christi ship channel. A Coast Guard helicopter hoisted two injured crew members to safety, and a boat crew from Chinook joined boats from Station Port Aransas and the patrol boat Manta in searching for four missing crew members.

== See also ==
- List of United States Coast Guard cutters
