= USCGC Seahawk =

United States Coast Guard patrol boat

- Seahawk at Carrabelle, Florida, when it was the Coast Guard's newest cutter

History

United States
- Name: Seahawk
- Operator: United States Coast Guard
- Builder: Bollinger Shipyards, Lockport, Louisiana
- Launched: May 30, 2000
- Commissioned: August 8, 2000 (special)
- Home port: Carrabelle, Florida
- Identification: Hull number: WPB-87323
- Status: In active service

General characteristics
- Class & type: Marine Protector-class patrol boat
- Length: 87 ft (27 m)
- Speed: 25 knots (46 km/h; 29 mph)

USCGC Seahawk (WPB-87323) is an 87-foot (27 m) Marine Protector-class patrol boat of the United States Coast Guard, based at Carrabelle, Florida, on the Florida Panhandle. Its name is sometimes written Sea Hawk. It operates in the northeastern Gulf of Mexico under Coast Guard Sector Mobile, and its crew has carried out search and rescue missions offshore.

== Design ==
Seahawk is one of the Marine Protector-class coastal patrol boats built for the Coast Guard by Bollinger Shipyards of Lockport, Louisiana, under a contract first awarded on March 13, 1996. The class replaced the older 82-foot Point-class cutters. The new design's improvements over the aging 82-foot boats include a top speed of 25 knots (46 km/h; 29 mph) as well as a stern ramp allowing its aluminum-hulled, diesel-powered waterjet small boat to be launched and recovered in seas up to sea state 4.

== Service history ==
It was launched on May 30, 2000, and entered service in a special commissioning on August 8, 2000.

In an incident reported in April 2008, the tugboat Ramrod began taking on water about 90 miles (140 km) south of Destin, Florida with four people aboard. The four moved from the sinking tug onto one of the barges it had been towing. Coast Guard Sector Mobile sent an HU-25 Falcon jet from the Aviation Training Center in Mobile along with Seahawk. The cutter's crew picked up all four and took them to St. Andrews Marina in Panama City, Florida.

== See also ==
- List of United States Coast Guard cutters
