= USCGC Dorado =

United States Coast Guard Marine Protector-class patrol boat

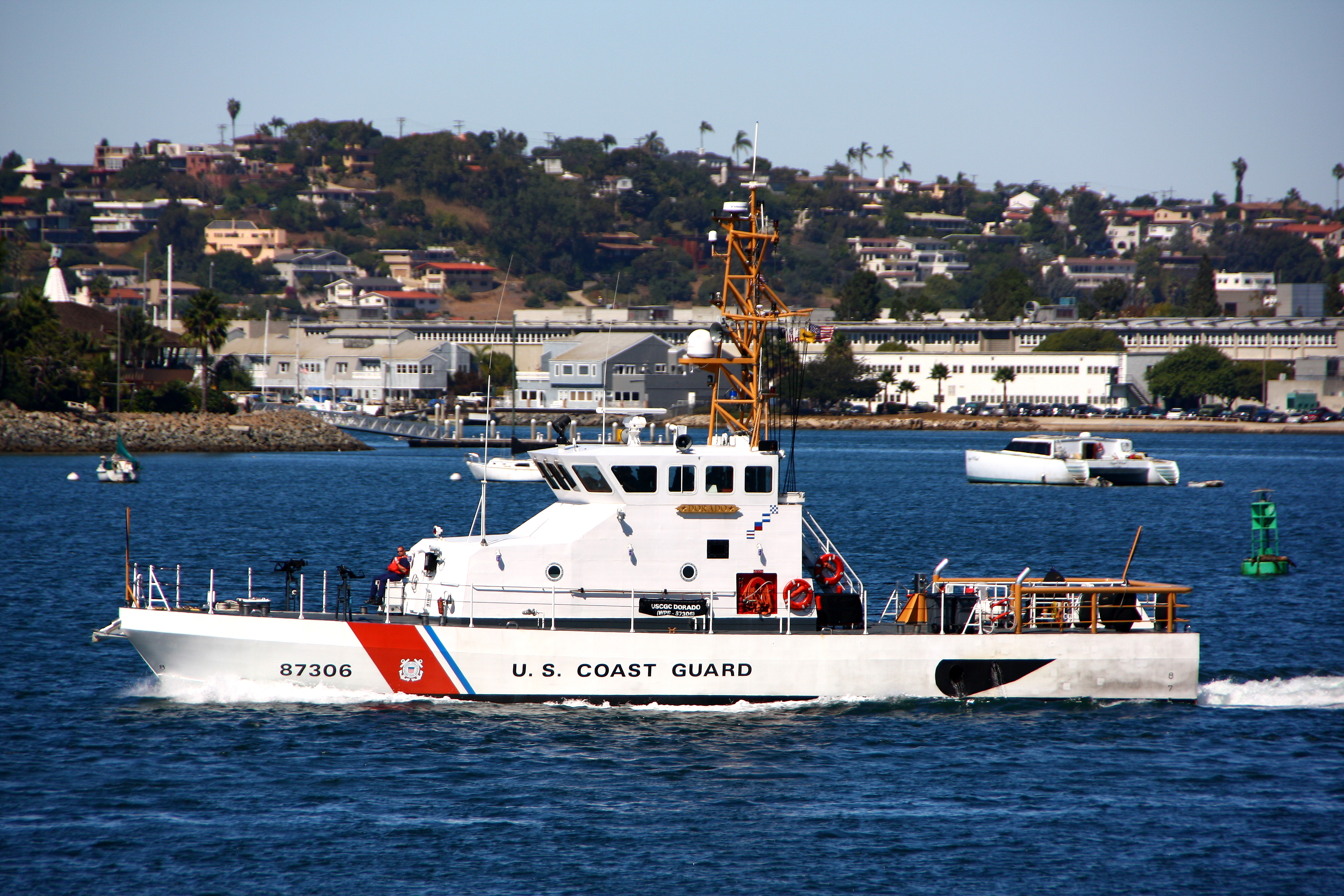
- USCGC Dorado (WPB-87306)

History

United States
- Name: USCGC Dorado
- Operator: United States Coast Guard
- Builder: Bollinger Shipyards, Lockport, Louisiana
- Commissioned: April 1999
- Decommissioned: 10 March 2021
- Home port: Crescent City, California
- Identification: MMSI number: 366999605; Callsign: NJEC; Pennant number: WPB-87306
- Motto: Per Officium Virtus; ("Virtue Through Duty")
- Fate: Decommissioned, awaiting sale to a foreign military partner

General characteristics
- Class & type: Marine Protector-class patrol boat
- Displacement: 91 long tons (92 t)
- Length: 87 ft 0 in (26.5 m)
- Beam: 19 ft 5 in (5.9 m)
- Draft: 5 ft 7 in (1.7 m)
- Propulsion: 2 × 1,500 hp (1,119 kW) MTU twin-turbocharged, eight-cylinder diesels
- Speed: 25 knots (46 km/h; 29 mph)+
- Range: 900 nmi (1,700 km)
- Endurance: 3 days
- Complement: 12
- Sensors & processing systems: 1 × AN/SPS-73 surface search radar
- Armament: 2 × .50 caliber M2 Browning machine guns

USCGC Dorado (WPB-87306) was the sixth cutter of the Marine Protector-class patrol boats. Dorado was built at Bollinger Shipyards in Lockport, Louisiana and commissioned in April 1999 and decommissioned on 10 March 2021. Dorado's home port was in Crescent City, California and served under Coast Guard Group Humboldt Bay in the Eleventh Coast Guard District.

After decommissioning, Dorado was transferred to the Department of Defense's Foreign Military Sales Program, and was transferred to the Lebanese Navy in 2023.
