= USCGC Yellowfin =

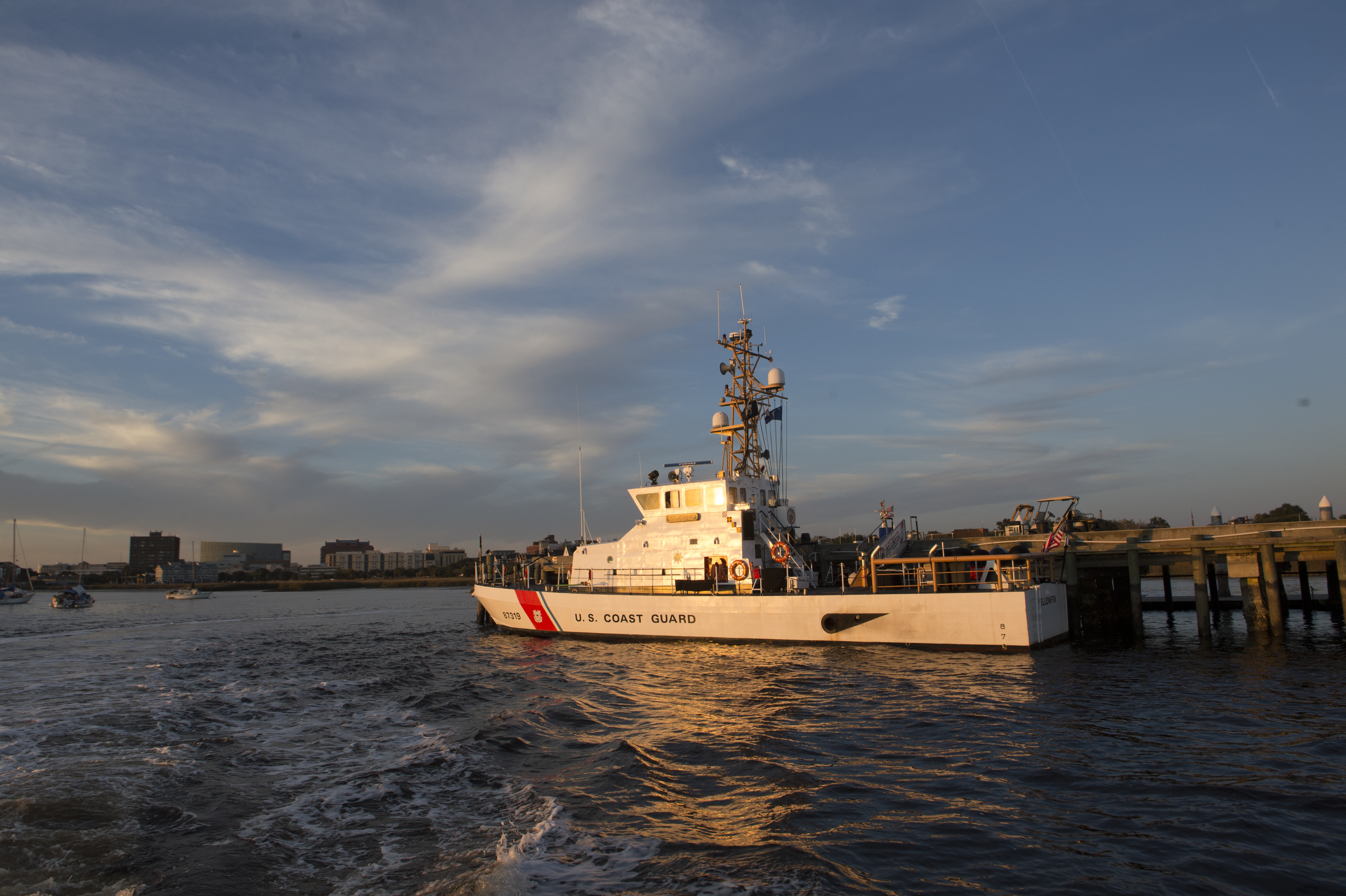

History

United States
- Name: USCGC Yellowfin
- Home port: Charleston, SC
- Identification: Hull number: WPB-87319; MMSI number: 366999621; Callsign: NRKG
- Status: in active service

General characteristics
- Class & type: Marine Protector-class patrol boat
- Displacement: 91 long tons (92 t)
- Length: 87 ft 0 in (26.5 m)
- Beam: 19 ft 5 in (5.9 m)
- Draft: 5 ft 7 in (1.7 m)
- Propulsion: 2 × MTU diesels
- Speed: 25 knots (46 km/h)
- Range: 900 nmi (1,700 km)
- Endurance: 5 days
- Complement: 10
- Armament: 2 × .50 caliber M2 Browning machine guns

USCGC Yellowfin (WPB-87319) is an 87-foot (27 m) long Marine Protector-class patrol boat of the United States Coast Guard built by Bollinger Shipyards in Lockport, Louisiana. She was the 19th vessel in her class, which was so successful that the Coast Guard commissioned 73 cutters.

She is home-ported in Charleston, South Carolina.

== Design ==
Like her sister ships she was designed for a crew of ten on missions of up to five days. She was designed for mixed-gender crews. Her modest armament is a pair of M2 Browning heavy machine guns. She was designed with a stern launching ramp that allows her to deploy and retrieve a high-speed pursuit boat without first coming to a stop. Only a single crew member is required to remain on deck when the pursuit boat is being launched or retrieved.

== Operational history ==
In September 2017, Yellowfin was one of the 13 Coast Guard cutters that were tasked to assist Puerto Rico respond to Hurricane Maria.

On August 30, 2018, Yellowfin and USS Zephyr intercepted a go-fast boat carrying four drug smugglers from the Dominican Republic, and 32 kilograms (71 lb) of cocaine.

On November 30, 2018, Yellowfin took part in a remembrance ceremony in Charleston, South Carolina, for those lost in the wreck of the pleasure craft Morning Dew, which sank with all hands on December 29, 1997.
