= USCGC Marlin =

United States Coast Guard patrol boat

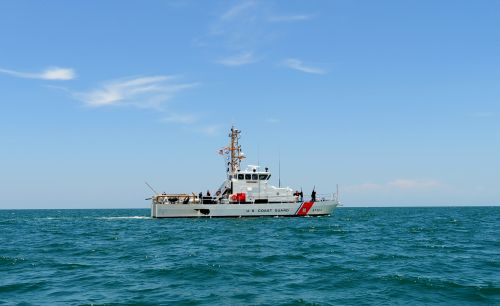

History

United States
- Name: USCGC Marlin
- Builder: Bollinger Shipyards, Lockport, Louisiana
- Out of service: 2026
- Home port: Boston, Massachusetts
- Identification: MMSI number: 366999603; Callsign: NJZP
- Fate: Transferred to Philippine Coast Guard
- Status: Decommissioned
- Notes: In active service as BRP Pag Asa (2701)

General characteristics
- Class & type: Marine Protector-class coastal patrol boat
- Displacement: 91 long tons (92 t)
- Length: 87 ft 0 in (26.5 m)
- Beam: 19 ft 5 in (5.9 m)
- Draft: 5 ft 7 in (1.7 m)
- Propulsion: 2 x MTU diesels
- Speed: 25 knots (46 km/h)
- Range: 900 nmi (1,700 km)
- Endurance: 5 days
- Complement: 10
- Armament: 2 × .50 caliber M2 Browning machine guns

USCGC Marlin (WPB-87304) is the fourth Marine Protector-class coastal patrol boat. Her home port was Boston, Massachusetts.

In 2010 Marlin was assigned to help clean up oil from the Deepwater Horizon oil spill.

In 2013 Marlin searched for David Lashley, a Florida resident whose boat broke down 15 miles (24 km) off Cedar Key.

On November 3, 2015, the Marlin and USCGC Kathleen Moore participated in the interception and repatriation of 85 individuals who tried to flee Cuba, by sea.

Decommissioned and transferred to Philippine Coast Guard in 2026. Renamed BRP Pag-asa (PATS-2701).
