= USCGC Hawk =

United States Coast Guard patrol boat

History

United States
- Name: Hawk
- Namesake: Hawk
- Operator: United States Coast Guard
- Builder: Bollinger Shipyards, Lockport, Louisiana
- Home port: St. Petersburg, Florida
- Identification: Hull number: WPB-87355
- Status: In active service

General characteristics
- Class & type: Marine Protector-class patrol boat
- Length: 87 ft (27 m)

USCGC Hawk (WPB-87355) is an 87-foot (27 m) Marine Protector-class patrol boat of the United States Coast Guard, based at Coast Guard Sector St. Petersburg in St. Petersburg, Florida. Its crew has responded to pollution incidents and vessels in distress in Tampa Bay and along Florida's Gulf coast. It has also offloaded cocaine seized during Operation Martillo, a multinational effort against drug trafficking.

== Design ==
Hawk is one of the Marine Protector-class coastal patrol boats built for the Coast Guard by Bollinger Shipyards of Lockport, Louisiana, under a contract first awarded on March 13, 1996. The class replaced the older 82-foot Point-class cutters.

== Service history ==
In February 2009 the 80-foot (24 m) trawler Maranatha collided with a 95-foot (29 m) barge in Tampa Bay. The collision tore a hole in one of the trawler's fuel tanks and spilled an estimated 800 to 1,000 US gallons (3,000 to 3,800 L) of diesel fuel. Hawk was on scene during the response, while a HH-60 Jayhawk helicopter from Air Station Clearwater surveyed the spill from the air.

On November 13, 2013, Hawk's crew offloaded more than $12 million worth of cocaine at Sector St. Petersburg. The drugs had been seized during Operation Martillo which brought together 14 nations from the Western Hemisphere and Europe to stop the flow of illicit cargo by transnational criminal organizations. Less than a year later on August 22, 2014, the crew offloaded another 576 kilograms (1,270 lb) of cocaine, worth about $19 million, also interdicted during Operation Martillo.

At 2 a.m. on April 8, 2014, the operator of the tug Abe H reported that heavy weather had left him unable to steer or control the two barges he was pushing, about 1 mile (1.6 km) west of Longboat Key. Sector St. Petersburg sent Hawk and a response boat from Coast Guard Station Cortez.

== See also ==
- Marine Protector-class patrol boat
- List of United States Coast Guard cutters
