= USCGC Wahoo =

United States Coast Guard patrol boat

- Wahoo patrols Elliott Bay during the Seafair Parade of Ships in Seattle, July 2008

History

United States
- Name: Wahoo
- Namesake: Wahoo
- Operator: United States Coast Guard
- Builder: Bollinger Shipyards, Lockport, Louisiana
- Launched: February 5, 2002
- Sponsored by: Lower Elwha Klallam Tribe
- Commissioned: August 9, 2002
- Home port: Port Angeles, Washington
- Identification: Hull number: WPB-87345
- Status: In active service

General characteristics
- Class & type: Marine Protector-class patrol boat
- Length: 87 ft (27 m)
- Speed: 25 knots (46 km/h; 29 mph)

USCGC Wahoo (WPB-87345) is an 87-foot (27 m) Marine Protector-class patrol boat of the United States Coast Guard, based at Ediz Hook in Port Angeles, Washington. Commissioned in August 2002, it patrols the Strait of Juan de Fuca and Puget Sound with missions including search and rescue, homeland security, fisheries enforcement, drug and migrant interdiction and marine environmental response. The cutter is sponsored by the Lower Elwha Klallam Tribe of Port Angeles.

== Design ==
Wahoo was the 45th coastal patrol boat built by Bollinger Shipyards in Lockport, Louisiana. Bollinger built the Marine Protector class under a contract first awarded on March 13, 1996. The class replaced the older 82-foot Point-class cutters. Wahoo has a top speed of 25 knots (46 km/h; 29 mph) and a stern ramp for launching its small boat quickly.

== Service history ==
=== Commissioning ===
Wahoo was launched and christened on February 5, 2002. In June 2002 it was due to join its sister ship Adelie, the 110-foot (34 m) cutter Cuttyhunk and the 210-foot (64 m) cutter Active at Coast Guard Group Port Angeles. The Coast Guard had first planned for Wahoo to replace Cuttyhunk, which was to move to Astoria, Oregon. It was the second of two new 87-foot patrol boats stationed at Port Angeles and the third of its class to arrive in the Pacific Northwest.

Wahoo was formally commissioned at Coast Guard Group Port Angeles on August 9, 2002. U.S. Senator Patty Murray, who had helped bring the cutter to Puget Sound, was the keynote speaker. Its first officer in charge was Senior Chief Petty Officer Thomas J. Johnson, who had previously commanded the patrol boat Barracuda at Eureka, California.

=== Operations ===
On July 30, 2008, Wahoo patrolled Elliott Bay in Seattle during the Seafair Parade of Ships. On May 17, 2013, a boarding team from Wahoo carried out a mock boarding of the Canadian destroyer HMCS Algonquin in the Strait of Juan de Fuca during Exercise Trident Fury, which was designed to improve cooperation between U.S. and Canadian maritime forces.

In May 2014 a man and a woman with two dogs were aboard a 19-foot (5.8 m) boat that began taking on water in the Strait of Juan de Fuca. Wahoo was already under way nearby. Its boat crew took the woman and both dogs off the boat, and a Wahoo crew member stayed aboard with the man. A response boat from Coast Guard Station Port Angeles passed them a dewatering pump, and the boat made it back to the public boat ramp on Ediz Hook.

== See also ==
- List of United States Coast Guard cutters
