= USCGC Ibis =

United States Coast Guard patrol boat

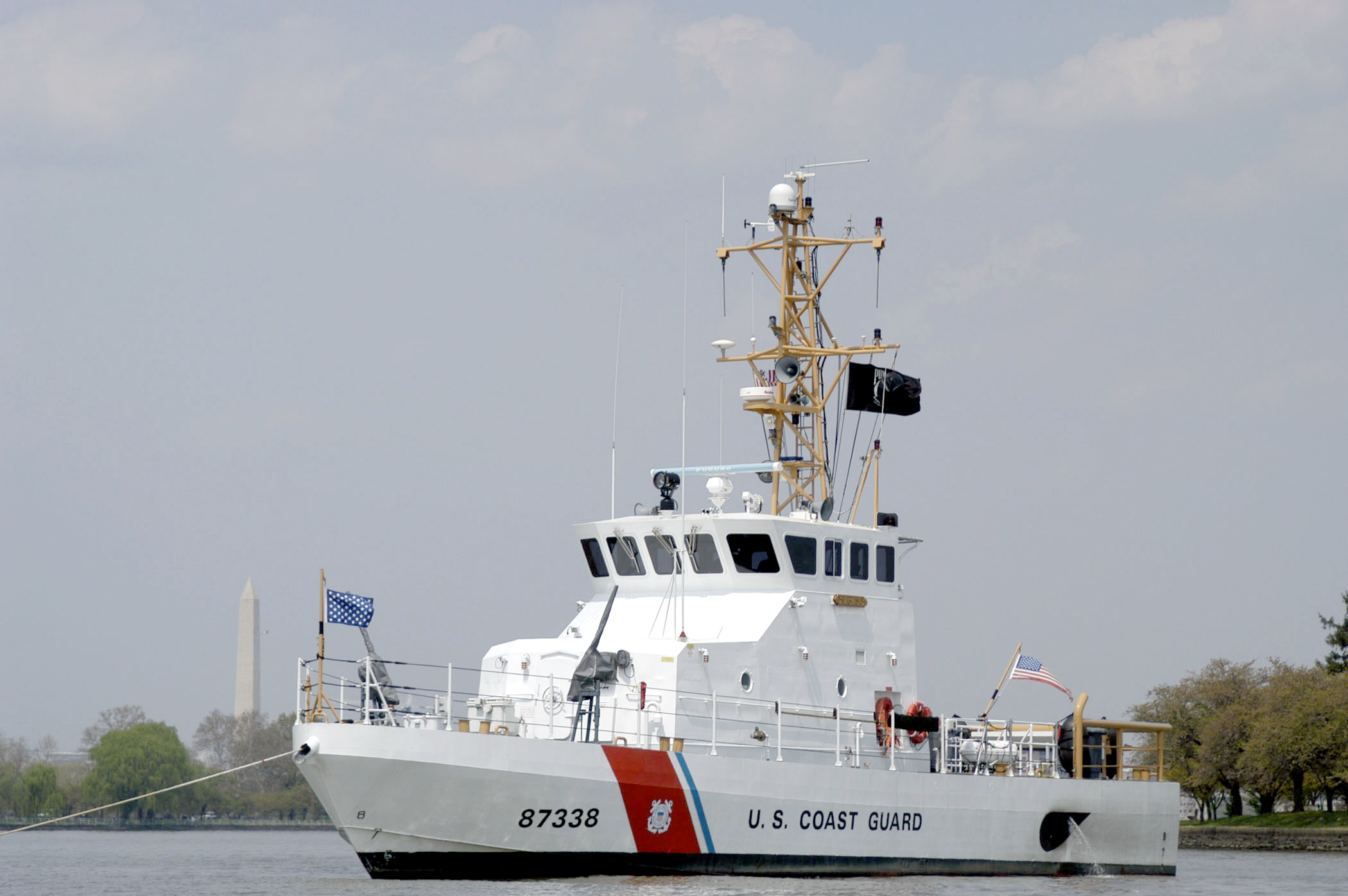
- Ibis anchored in the Potomac River in Washington, D.C., with the Washington Monument behind it, April 2003

History

United States
- Name: Ibis
- Namesake: Ibis
- Operator: United States Coast Guard
- Builder: Bollinger Shipyards, Lockport, Louisiana
- Completed: 2000
- Home port: Cape May, New Jersey
- Identification: Hull number: WPB-87338
- Status: In active service

General characteristics
- Class & type: Marine Protector-class patrol boat
- Length: 87 ft (27 m)

USCGC Ibis (WPB-87338) is an 87-foot (27 m) Marine Protector-class patrol boat of the United States Coast Guard, based in Cape May, New Jersey, under Coast Guard Sector Delaware Bay. Built in 2000, it typically patrols the Mid-Atlantic coast between New York City and Chesapeake Bay. Its main missions are search and rescue, law enforcement and port, waterway and coastal security.

== Design ==
Ibis is one of the Marine Protector-class patrol boats built for the Coast Guard by Bollinger Shipyards of Lockport, Louisiana, under a contract first awarded on March 13, 1996. The class replaced the older 82-foot Point-class cutters. Ibis was built in 2000.

== Service history ==
In April 2003 Ibis deployed to Washington, D.C., to carry out homeland security operations on the Potomac River.

In 2014 Ibis became the first cutter to finish the Coast Guard's 87-foot "Bow-to-Stern" project at the Coast Guard Yard in Baltimore. The yard finished the work on Ibis in 60 days and under budget. It delivered the cutter in November 2014.

On January 21, 2016, Ibis operated in the Atlantic with the patrol boats Finback and Mako.

== See also ==
- List of United States Coast Guard cutters
