= USCGC Crocodile =

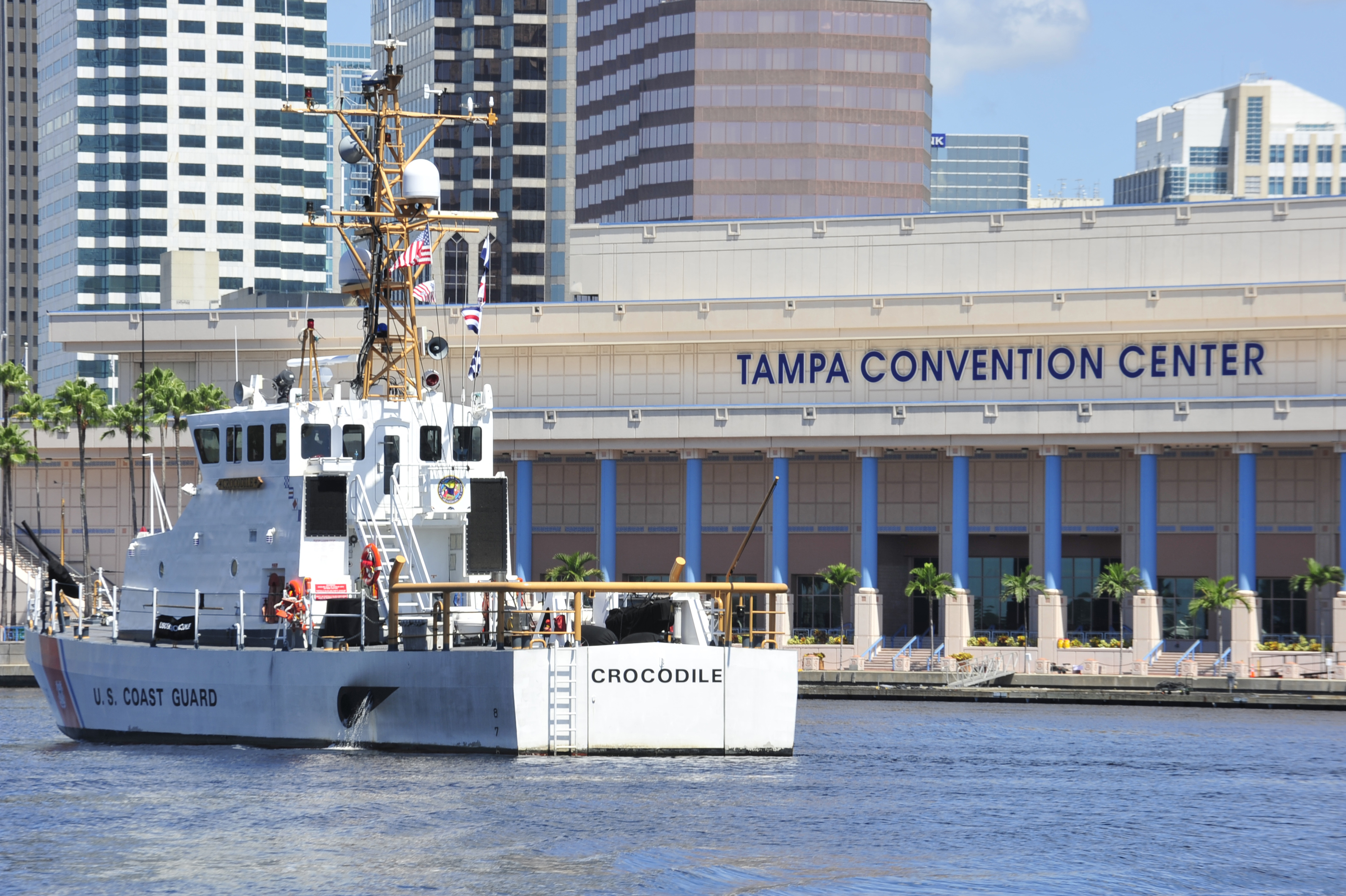

History

United States
- Name: USCGC Crocodile
- Builder: Bollinger Shipyards, Lockport, Louisiana
- Home port: St Petersburg, Florida
- Identification: MMSI number: 369493458; Callsign: NCFA
- Status: in active service
- Badge

General characteristics
- Class & type: Marine Protector-class coastal patrol boat
- Displacement: 91 long tons (92 t)
- Length: 87 ft 0 in (26.5 m)
- Beam: 19 ft 5 in (5.9 m)
- Draft: 5 ft 7 in (1.7 m)
- Propulsion: 2 x MTU 8V396TE94 diesels
- Speed: 25 knots (46 km/h)
- Range: 900 nmi (1,700 km)
- Endurance: 3 days
- Boats & landing craft carried: 1 high-speed deployable underway
- Complement: 10
- Armament: 2 × .50-caliber M2 Browning machine guns

USCGC Crocodile (WPB-87369) is the sixty-ninth Marine Protector-class coastal patrol boat. Its home port is St Petersburg, Florida.

== Background ==
On December 30, 2021, the Crocodile participated in the search conducted between Cedar Key and west of Sea Horse Reef for two men who went missing after their 31-foot (9.4 m) vessel Dog House sank. Other Coast Guard air and surface assets and crews involved in the search included:

- a station Yankeetown 29-foot response boat
- an Air Station Clearwater Sikorsky MH-60 Jayhawk helicopter
- an Air Station Clearwater Lockheed HC-130 Hercules aircraft
- Florida Fish and Wildlife officers and Levy County Sheriff's Office with marine units.
