= USCGC Sea Horse =

United States Coast Guard patrol boat

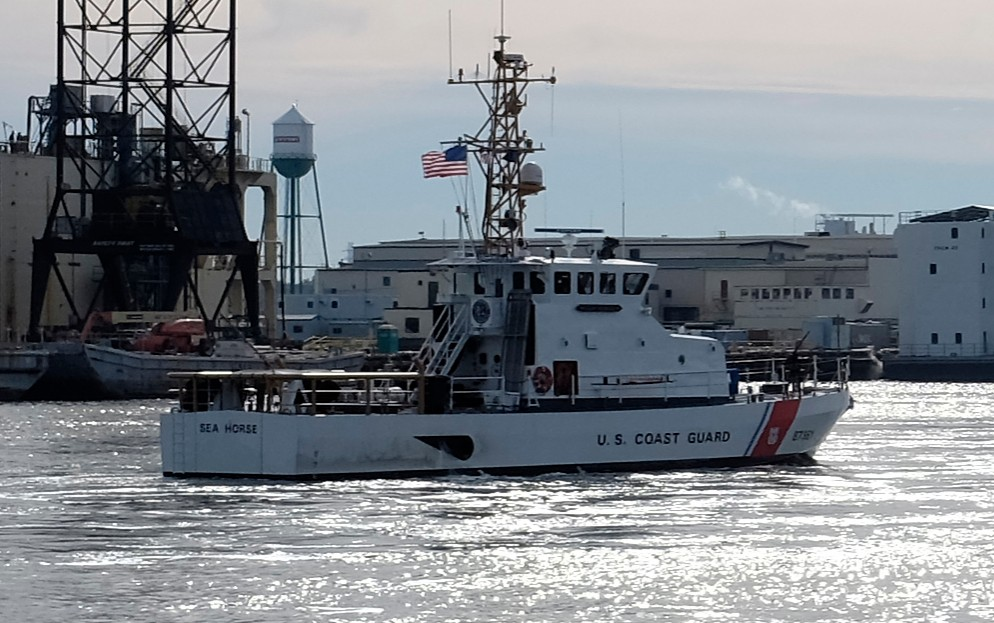
- Sea Horse on the Elizabeth River, Virginia, in 2014

History

United States
- Name: Sea Horse
- Namesake: Seahorse
- Operator: United States Coast Guard
- Builder: Bollinger Shipyards, Lockport, Louisiana
- Home port: Portsmouth, Virginia
- Identification: Hull number: WPB-87361
- Status: In active service

General characteristics
- Class & type: Marine Protector-class patrol boat
- Length: 87 ft (27 m)
- Complement: 12 (2012)

USCGC Sea Horse (WPB-87361) is an 87-foot (27 m) Marine Protector-class patrol boat of the United States Coast Guard, based in Portsmouth, Virginia. Its crew carries out search and rescue, law enforcement and security missions in Hampton Roads and along the Mid-Atlantic coast, including escorting U.S. Navy warships through the Elizabeth River.

== Design ==
Sea Horse is one of the Marine Protector-class coastal patrol boats built for the Coast Guard by Bollinger Shipyards of Lockport, Louisiana, under a contract first awarded on March 13, 1996. The class replaced the older 82-foot Point-class cutters.

== Service history ==
In January 2009 Sea Horse went to Washington, D.C., to support security for the presidential inauguration. With response boat crews from Coast Guard Station Portsmouth, it escorted the aircraft carrier USS Harry S. Truman on a transit of the Elizabeth River.

In spring 2012 Sea Horse returned to Portsmouth after a 33-day deployment as a standby search and rescue cutter. During the patrol its crew helped provide security for Vice President Joe Biden's visit to South Carolina over Easter weekend.

In one case, Sea Horse answered the call of a disabled 35-foot (11 m) sailboat that had run out of fuel and begun taking on water, with a 68-year-old man aboard. After a boarding team confirmed the sailboat was no longer flooding, the cutter towed it to Ocean City, Maryland. Sea Horse also responded with a Response Boat – Medium crew from Station Little Creek to a sailboat in distress in foul weather off northeastern Virginia.

=== Changes of command ===
On June 25, 2015, Sea Horse and the 87-foot patrol boats Shearwater and Cochito, all based in Hampton Roads, changed commanding officers in a joint ceremony at Sector Hampton Roads in Portsmouth.

== See also ==
- List of United States Coast Guard cutters
