= USCGC Pelican =

United States Coast Guard patrol boat

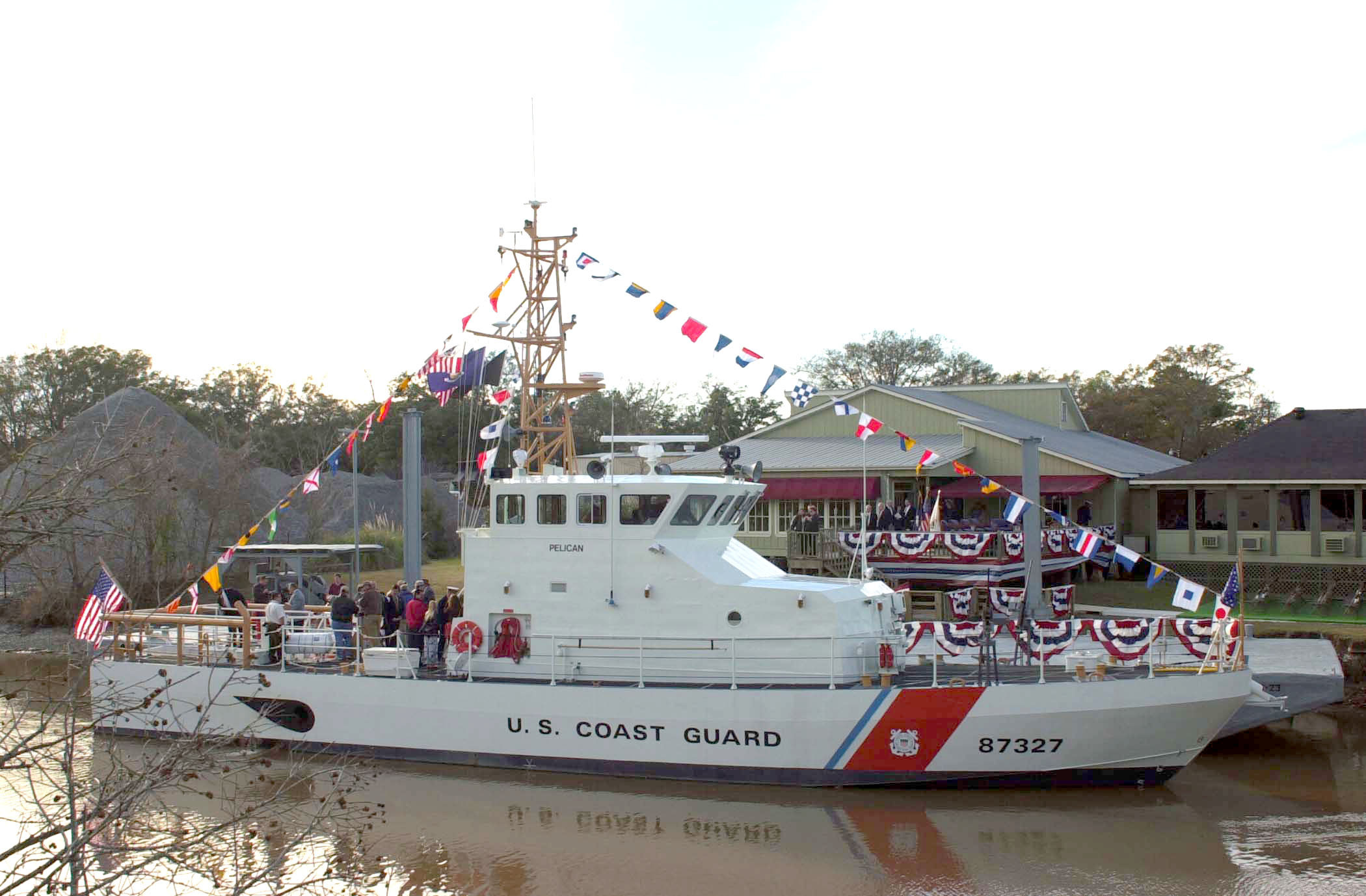
- Pelican dressed with flags on its commissioning day, January 8, 2001

History

United States
- Name: Pelican
- Namesake: Pelican
- Operator: United States Coast Guard
- Builder: Bollinger Shipyards, Lockport, Louisiana
- Commissioned: January 8, 2001
- Home port: Port of Vermilion, Abbeville, Louisiana
- Identification: Hull number: WPB-87327
- Status: In active service

General characteristics
- Class & type: Marine Protector-class patrol boat
- Length: 87 ft (27 m)

USCGC Pelican (WPB-87327) is an 87-foot (27 m) Marine Protector-class patrol boat of the United States Coast Guard, based at the Port of Vermilion in Abbeville, Louisiana. Commissioned at Abbeville in January 2001, it carries out search and rescue, environmental protection and maritime law enforcement in the Gulf of Mexico. Its crew took part in the search for the 11 missing workers after the 2010 Deepwater Horizon explosion, and in the search for two missing workers after a 2012 platform explosion off Grand Isle.

== Design ==
Pelican is one of the Marine Protector-class coastal patrol boats built for the Coast Guard by Bollinger Shipyards of Lockport, Louisiana, under a contract first awarded on March 13, 1996. The class replaced the older 82-foot Point-class cutters.

== Service history ==
=== Commissioning and homeport ===
Pelican was commissioned on January 8, 2001, at Abbeville. At the time, the Coast Guard planned to move the cutter to the Port of Vermilion once that facility was finished.

=== Deepwater Horizon ===
At about 10 p.m. on April 20, 2010, the Eighth District command center received a report of an explosion and fire aboard the drilling rig Deepwater Horizon, about 42 miles (68 km) southeast of Venice, Louisiana. Eleven crew members were missing. The patrol boats Cobia and Zephyr searched through the night. Pelican and the patrol boat Coho were also dispatched to the search.

=== Search and rescue ===
On the morning of November 16, 2012, a fire broke out on the West Delta 32 oil platform owned by Black Elk Energy, about 20 miles (32 km) southeast of Grand Isle. Eleven workers were taken to hospitals and two were missing. Pelican and the patrol boat Razorbill joined response boats from Stations Grand Isle and Venice, along with aircraft from Aviation Training Center Mobile and Air Station New Orleans. The Coast Guard suspended the search on November 17 after covering 1,400 square miles (3,600 km^{2}) in more than 32 hours.

In January 2014 Pelican searched for a 25-year-old crewman reported missing from the 598-foot (182 m) Hong Kong-flagged crude oil tanker Rainbow Quest near Southwest Pass. Aircraft, helicopters and two response boats from Station Venice also took part. The search was suspended on January 8 after 44 hours and 1,179 square miles (3,050 km^{2}) searched.

== See also ==
- List of United States Coast Guard cutters
