= USCGC Bonito =

United States Coast Guard patrol boat

- Bonito on the East River in New York City

History

United States
- Name: Bonito
- Namesake: Bonito
- Operator: United States Coast Guard
- Builder: Bollinger Shipyards, Lockport, Louisiana
- Home port: Montauk, New York (until 2024)
- Identification: Hull number: WPB-87341
- Status: In active service

General characteristics
- Class & type: Marine Protector-class patrol boat
- Length: 87 ft (27 m)
- Range: 900 miles (1,400 km)
- Armament: 2 × .50-caliber machine guns

USCGC Bonito (WPB-87341) is an 87-foot (27 m) Marine Protector-class of the United States Coast Guard. It has served along the Atlantic coast from Long Island to Maryland, taking part in searches for missing boaters and fishermen. Until early 2024 it was the patrol boat at Coast Guard Station Montauk on the eastern tip of Long Island. Because of a Coast Guard personnel shortage, it was then withdrawn from Montauk and laid up at Baltimore, despite objections from East Hampton town officials. By April 2025 it was operating again in New York.

== Design ==
Bonito is one of the Marine Protector-class coastal patrol boats built for the Coast Guard by Bollinger Shipyards of Lockport, Louisiana, under a contract first awarded on March 13, 1996. The class replaced the older 82-foot Point-class cutters. The boats have a range of about 900 miles (1,400 km) and Bonito carries a small rigid-hulled inflatable boat, Bonito-1, which is stored on its stern.

== Service history ==
=== Search and rescue ===
In September 2016 Bonito, then listed as based in New York, joined the medium endurance cutter Campbell and aircraft from Air Stations Cape Cod and Elizabeth City in searching about 11,000 square miles (28,000 km^{2}) off Montauk for a mother and son from Rhode Island who were missing on an offshore fishing trip.

In July 2020 Bonito searched alongside a Coast Guard helicopter from Air Station Atlantic City and two response boats for a swimmer last seen near the Ocean City bridge in Ocean City, New Jersey. The Coast Guard suspended the search after more than 21 hours and 82 square miles (210 km^{2}). In October 2021 it was sent to help search for an overdue fisherman near Cobb Island on the Potomac River, along with Coast Guard and Navy aircraft.

=== Withdrawal from Montauk ===
By 2023 Bonito was stationed in Montauk Harbor, where it was the only cutter at Coast Guard Station Montauk. In December 2023 the Coast Guard announced that it would withdraw the cutter from Montauk in early 2024 because of a shortage of personnel, part of a service-wide "force alignment initiative" for 2024. Bonito would be laid up ashore in Baltimore "pending sufficient personnel to be activated again" and its crew would move to another patrol boat in Highlands, New Jersey.

== See also ==
- Marine Protector-class patrol boat
- List of United States Coast Guard cutters
