= USCGC Brant =

United States Coast Guard patrol boat

- Brant being decomissioned in 2022

History

United States
- Name: Brant
- Namesake: Brant, a small North American goose
- Operator: United States Coast Guard
- Builder: Bollinger Shipyards, Lockport, Louisiana
- Completed: July 2002
- Decommissioned: March 17, 2022
- Home port: Corpus Christi, Texas; Gulfport, Mississippi; St. Petersburg, Florida (2019–2022)
- Identification: Hull number: WPB-87348
- Fate: Offered for transfer to foreign governments as an excess defense article

General characteristics
- Class & type: Marine Protector-class patrol boat
- Length: 87 ft (27 m)

USCGC Brant (WPB-87348) is a former 87-foot (27 m) Marine Protector-class patrol boat of the United States Coast Guard. Built in 2002, it served for almost 20 years along the Gulf Coast. It was based first at Corpus Christi and then at Gulfport before moving to St. Petersburg, Florida, in 2019. Its crew enforced fisheries laws against foreign boats fishing illegally in U.S. waters and supported both NASA and SpaceX capsule recovery operations in the Gulf. It was decommissioned in March 2022, as the Coast Guard replaced its Marine Protector-class boats with the larger Sentinel-class cutters.

== Design ==
Brant was one of the Marine Protector-class coastal patrol boats built for the Coast Guard by Bollinger Shipyards of Lockport, Louisiana, under a contract first awarded on March 13, 1996. The class replaced the older 82-foot Point-class cutters. Brant was built in July 2002. It was named for the brant, a small North American goose.

== Service history ==
Brant's first homeport was Corpus Christi. There its crew served as on-scene commander for military out-load operations at the port, carried out boardings of high-interest vessels and escorted high-value assets. The cutter later moved to Gulfport.

Brant made several interdictions of vessels fishing illegally inside the U.S. exclusive economic zone. In one case its crew seized 1,500 pounds (680 kg) of illegally caught marine life, including 500 fish and 150 sharks. The fishing vessel then began to sink, and Brant's crew rescued the four people aboard.

Brant arrived in St. Petersburg in 2019. It supported NASA and SpaceX Dragon capsule recovery operations in the Gulf of Mexico and was one of the first cutters the Coast Guard used to develop its drone program.

=== Decommissioning ===
Brant was decommissioned in St. Petersburg on March 17, 2022, just short of 20 years after it was built. After the ceremony, the final crew sailed the cutter to the Coast Guard Yard in Baltimore, where it was to be offered to other countries through the Foreign Military Sales excess defense articles process. Its replacement in Tampa Bay was the 154-foot (47 m) fast response cutter Pablo Valent, due to arrive in the summer of 2022.

== See also ==
- List of United States Coast Guard cutters
