= USCGC Heron =

United States Coast Guard patrol boat

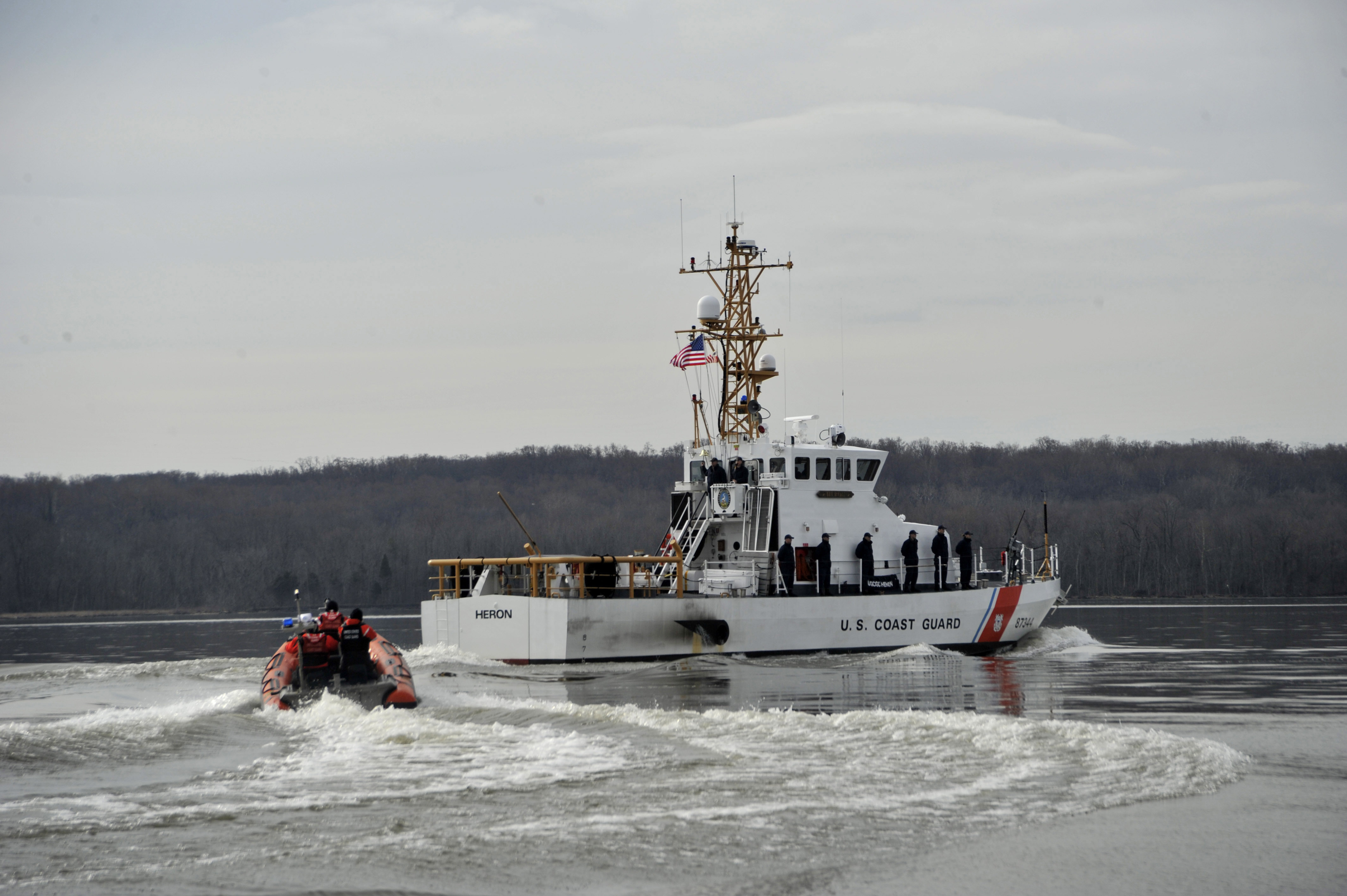
- Heron enforces a security zone on the Potomac River before the 2017 presidential inauguration

History

United States
- Name: Heron
- Namesake: Heron
- Operator: United States Coast Guard
- Builder: Bollinger Shipyards, Lockport, Louisiana
- Launched: January 8, 2002
- Commissioned: May 17, 2002
- Home port: Sabine Pass, Texas (2003–2012); Virginia Beach, Virginia (2017)
- Identification: Hull number: WPB-87344
- Status: In active service

General characteristics
- Class & type: Marine Protector-class patrol boat
- Length: 87 ft (27 m)

USCGC Heron (WPB-87344) is an 87-foot (27 m) Marine Protector-class patrol boat of the United States Coast Guard. Commissioned in 2002, it spent its first decade at Sabine Pass on the Texas coast, where its crew enforced federal fisheries laws against shrimp boats fishing in closed waters. By 2017 it was based at Virginia Beach, Virginia, and it helped provide waterway security for the 2017 presidential inauguration. It has since operated off Florida, Georgia and North Carolina.

== Design ==
Heron is one of the Marine Protector-class coastal patrol boats built for the Coast Guard by Bollinger Shipyards of Lockport, Louisiana, under a contract first awarded on March 13, 1996. The class replaced the older 82-foot Point-class cutters.

== Service history ==
Heron was launched and christened on January 8, 2002. It entered service in a special commissioning on March 10, 2002, and was fully commissioned on May 17, 2002.

=== Sabine Pass ===
On July 16, 2003, Heron, then based at Coast Guard Station Sabine, escorted the shrimp boat Christian G into Galveston. The Coast Guard seized more than 41,000 pounds (19,000 kg) of shrimp from the boat for violating several federal fisheries laws.

In June 2012 Heron spotted three shrimp boats fishing in closed waters about 90 miles (140 km) off Galveston. Texas closes its waters to shrimping for 30 to 90 days a year so the shrimp can mature, and the National Marine Fisheries Service extends the closure out to 200 nautical miles. The Coast Guard seized 16,431 pounds (7,453 kg) of shrimp from the boats and offloaded it on June 26 at a seafood facility near Port Arthur.

=== Atlantic coast ===
In January 2017, Heron, by then homeported in Virginia Beach, helped enforce a waterway security zone on the Potomac River around Washington, D.C., leading up to the inauguration of President Donald Trump.

On May 4, 2019, Heron and a helicopter from Air Station Miami responded to a distress alert from a 24-foot (7.3 m) pleasure boat about 12 miles (19 km) northwest of Bimini in the Bahamas. The helicopter crew found the boat circling with no one aboard and hoisted its operator from the water. On November 6, 2020, Heron's crew assisted a 45-foot (14 m) sailboat with one person aboard that had become disabled about 90 miles (140 km) off Savannah, Georgia. A response boat from Coast Guard Station Mayport helped tow the sailboat toward shore to a commercial salvage company.

== See also ==
- List of United States Coast Guard cutters
