= USCGC Ahi =

United States Coast Guard patrol boat

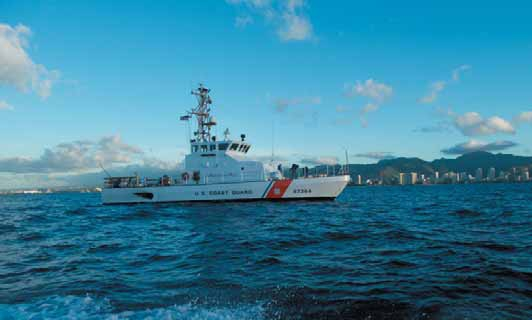
- Ahi patrols off Waikiki

History

United States
- Name: Ahi
- Namesake: Ahi
- Operator: United States Coast Guard
- Builder: Bollinger Shipyards, Lockport, Louisiana
- Out of service: June 7, 2021
- Home port: Honolulu, Hawaii
- Identification: Hull number: WPB-87364
- Fate: Decommissioned

General characteristics
- Class & type: Marine Protector-class patrol boat
- Length: 87 ft (27 m)

USCGC Ahi (WPB-87364) is a former 87-foot (27 m) Marine Protector-class patrol boat of the United States Coast Guard. It was based in Honolulu, Hawaii and patrolled the waters around Oahu. Its crew took part in the 2012 rescue of 40 people aboard the sinking research vessel Kilo Moana and in the 2017 searches for an Army UH-60 Black Hawk that crashed off Kaena Point and for a helicopter lost off Molokai. Ahi was decommissioned in June 2021.

== Design ==
Ahi is one of the Marine Protector-class coastal patrol boats built for the Coast Guard by Bollinger Shipyards of Lockport, Louisiana, under a contract first awarded on March 13, 1996. The class replaced the older 82-foot Point-class cutters. Compared with the older boats, the 87-foot design could operate in rougher seas (up to sea state 5). It also had a stern ramp for launching its small boat and a much larger pilothouse with an integrated bridge electronics system.

== Service history ==
=== Kilo Moana rescue ===
On January 6, 2012, the 186-foot (57 m) University of Hawaii research vessel Kilo Moana began sinking about 60 miles (97 km) north of Turtle Bay, Oahu, with 40 people aboard. A Coast Guard rescue swimmer boarded the ship and three pumps were delivered. Ahi and a rescue boat from Coast Guard Station Kauai were also sent to help.

=== 2017 helicopter searches ===
At 10:08 p.m. on August 15, 2017, the Coast Guard's Joint Rescue Coordination Center in Honolulu was told that Wheeler Army Airfield had lost contact with a UH-60 Black Hawk with five soldiers aboard. The helicopter had been training between Kaena Point and Dillingham Airfield. A Coast Guard HC-130 Hercules crew and an Army Black Hawk crew spotted a debris field about 2 miles (3.2 km) west of Kaena Point at 11:28 p.m. Ahi was among the Coast Guard, Army and Honolulu Fire Department units sent to search for the missing soldiers.

On the evening of October 16, 2017, a Robinson R44 helicopter with two men aboard lost contact with the Honolulu airport control tower while returning from a day trip to Molokai. Ahi and the 110-foot (34 m) patrol boat Galveston Island searched alongside Coast Guard, Navy, county fire department and civilian aircraft. The Coast Guard suspended the search on October 19 after 53 searches covering about 19,300 square miles (50,000 km^{2}). The two men were never found.

=== Decommissioning ===
By 2021 the Coast Guard was decommissioning some of its Marine Protector-class boats for budget reasons. Commandant Admiral Karl Schultz said in March 2021 that Congress had funded more 87-foot patrol boats than the program required. He also said some of the retired boats might be offered to foreign navies and coast guards as excess defense articles. Ahi was decommissioned on June 7, 2021.

== See also ==
- List of United States Coast Guard cutters
