= USCGC Sailfish =

United States Coast Guard patrol boat

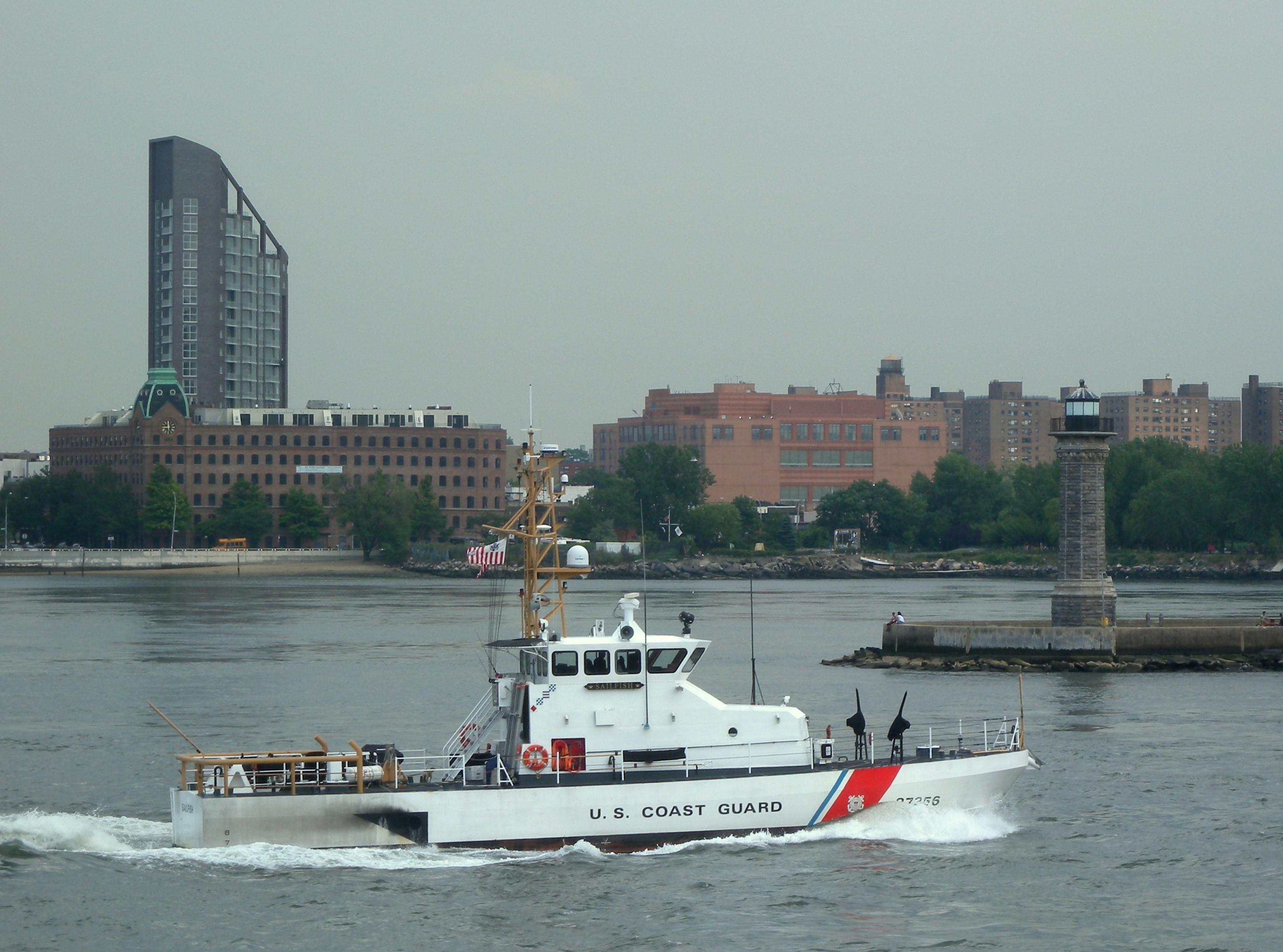
- Sailfish on the East River off Roosevelt Island, New York City

History

United States
- Name: Sailfish
- Operator: United States Coast Guard
- Builder: Bollinger Shipyards, Lockport, Louisiana
- Home port: Sandy Hook, New Jersey (to 2012); Bayonne, New Jersey (after 2012); Little Creek, Virginia (by 2022)
- Identification: Hull number: WPB-87356
- Status: In active service

General characteristics
- Class & type: Marine Protector-class patrol boat
- Displacement: 100 long tons (100 t)
- Length: 87 ft (27 m)
- Beam: 19.5 ft (5.9 m)
- Speed: 25 knots (46 km/h; 29 mph)
- Range: 900 nautical miles (1,700 km; 1,000 mi)

USCGC Sailfish (WPB-87356) is an 87-foot (27 m) Marine Protector-class patrol boat of the United States Coast Guard. For most of its career it patrolled New York Harbor from bases at Sandy Hook and Bayonne in New Jersey, carrying out homeland security patrols as well as search and rescue. By 2022 it had moved to Little Creek in Virginia Beach, Virginia. In June 2024 Sailfish escorted the container ship Dali out of Baltimore after the Francis Scott Key Bridge collapse.

== Design ==
Sailfish is one of the Marine Protector-class coastal patrol boats built for the Coast Guard by Bollinger Shipyards of Lockport, Louisiana, under a contract first awarded on March 13, 1996. The class replaced the older 82-foot Point-class cutters. As with all boats in the class, the Sailfish is 87 feet (27 m) long and 19.5 feet (5.9 m) wide, with a displacement of 100 long tons, a top speed of 25 knots and a range of 900 nautical miles.

== Service history ==
=== New York Harbor ===
Sailfish was originally based at Sandy Hook, New Jersey, the mission on the waterways around New York City of homeland security patrols and search and rescue.

Hurricane Sandy in October 2012 left the Coast Guard piers at Sandy Hook unusable. Sailfish and the cutter Bainbridge Island moved to Bayonne, where they were based for several years. From Bayonne the cutter ran armed patrols to protect structures in New York Harbor. In a notable event in 2015 it escorted U.S. Navy warships into the harbor during Fleet Week. The following year, in November 2016, its crew helped set up a tow for a disabled ferry carrying about 100 people in New York Harbor.

=== Virginia ===
By August 2022 Sailfish was based at Little Creek in Virginia Beach, Virginia. Its crew rescued the master of a sinking sailboat about 25 nautical miles east of False Cape, after the boat lost its steering and began taking on water through the rudder post.

=== Dali escort ===
On March 26, 2024, the container ship Dali lost power and struck the Francis Scott Key Bridge in Baltimore, collapsing it and killing six construction workers. When the ship left Baltimore for the Port of Virginia on June 24, 2024, Sailfish escorted it and enforced a 500-yard (460 m) safety zone around it for the voyage. The ship went first to Virginia International Gateway to offload about 1,500 containers, then to Norfolk International Terminals for salvage and repairs.

== See also ==
- List of United States Coast Guard cutters
