= USCGC Albacore =

United States Coast Guard patrol boat, later of the Uruguayan Navy

- Albacore conducting security patrols around Washington D.C. during Memorial Day Weekend 2004.

History

United States
- Name: Albacore
- Namesake: Albacore
- Operator: United States Coast Guard
- Builder: Bollinger Shipyards, Lockport, Louisiana
- In service: 1999
- Out of service: March 10, 2021
- Home port: Little Creek, Virginia (2004); New London, Connecticut (2015–2021)
- Identification: Hull number: WPB-87309
- Fate: Transferred to Uruguay, 2022

Uruguay
- Name: Río Arapey
- Namesake: Arapey River
- Operator: National Navy of Uruguay
- Acquired: December 15, 2021
- Commissioned: September 1, 2022
- Identification: ROU 14
- Status: In active service

General characteristics
- Class & type: Marine Protector-class patrol boat
- Length: 87 ft (27 m)
- Complement: 10 (2004)

USCGC Albacore (WPB-87309) is an 87-foot (27 m) Marine Protector-class patrol boat that served in the United States Coast Guard from 1999 to 2021. It was based at Little Creek in Virginia Beach, Virginia, and later at the United States Coast Guard Academy in New London, Connecticut, where it served as the academy's only operational unit. Its missions included search and rescue, law enforcement, naval vessel escorts, recreational boating safety and fisheries enforcement. After it was decommissioned in March 2021, the United States donated it to Uruguay where it now serves in the National Navy of Uruguay as ROU 14 Río Arapey.

== Design ==
Albacore is one of the Marine Protector-class coastal patrol boats built for the Coast Guard by Bollinger Shipyards of Lockport, Louisiana, under a contract first awarded on March 13, 1996. The class replaced the older 82-foot Point-class cutters.

== United States Coast Guard ==
=== Little Creek ===
Albacore entered Coast Guard service in 1999. By 2004 it was docked at Coast Guard Station Little Creek in Virginia Beach and was used mainly for coastal patrols. Its boarding teams checked boats for compliance with Coast Guard safety rules and searched them for illegal weapons and drugs.

=== New London ===
In 2015 Albacore went through the Coast Guard's 87-foot "Bow-to-Stern" maintenance program at the Coast Guard Yard in Baltimore. Under the program, a patrol boat that had finished a 60-day overhaul at the yard took the place of another boat, which then began its own overhaul. Albacore was delivered on August 19, 2015, on time and under budget, and replaced Chinook as the patrol boat based at New London. At New London, Albacore was attached to the Coast Guard Academy as the only operational unit at the academy. Its missions there included search and rescue, escorting naval vessels, recreational boating safety and enforcing fisheries regulations.

=== Decommissioning ===
Albacore was decommissioned on March 10, 2021, at a ceremony in Panama City, Florida, after 22 years of service.

== National Navy of Uruguay ==
In June 2021 the United States approved the donation of Albacore and its sister ships Gannet and Cochito to Uruguay under the Excess Defense Articles program, valued at $8,685,000. The commander of the Uruguayan Navy, Admiral Jorge Wilson, signed the letter of acceptance on December 15, 2021. Uruguay received the boats as a no-cost grant but paid $4.9 million for their refurbishment and for training its crews.

The three boats were handed over to the Uruguayan Navy at a ceremony at the Coast Guard base in Baltimore in 2022. The plan was for two to be based at the new Fray Bentos Naval Base on the Uruguay River and the third at Montevideo. A Uruguayan government decree of April 17, 2023, formally added the boats to the navy as of September 1, 2022, and named the former Albacore ROU 14 Río Arapey. The boats left the United States in September 2022, and by January 2023 the navy was using them to patrol its waterways on the border with Argentina.

== See also ==
- List of United States Coast Guard cutters
