= USCGC Kingfisher =

United States Coast Guard patrol boat

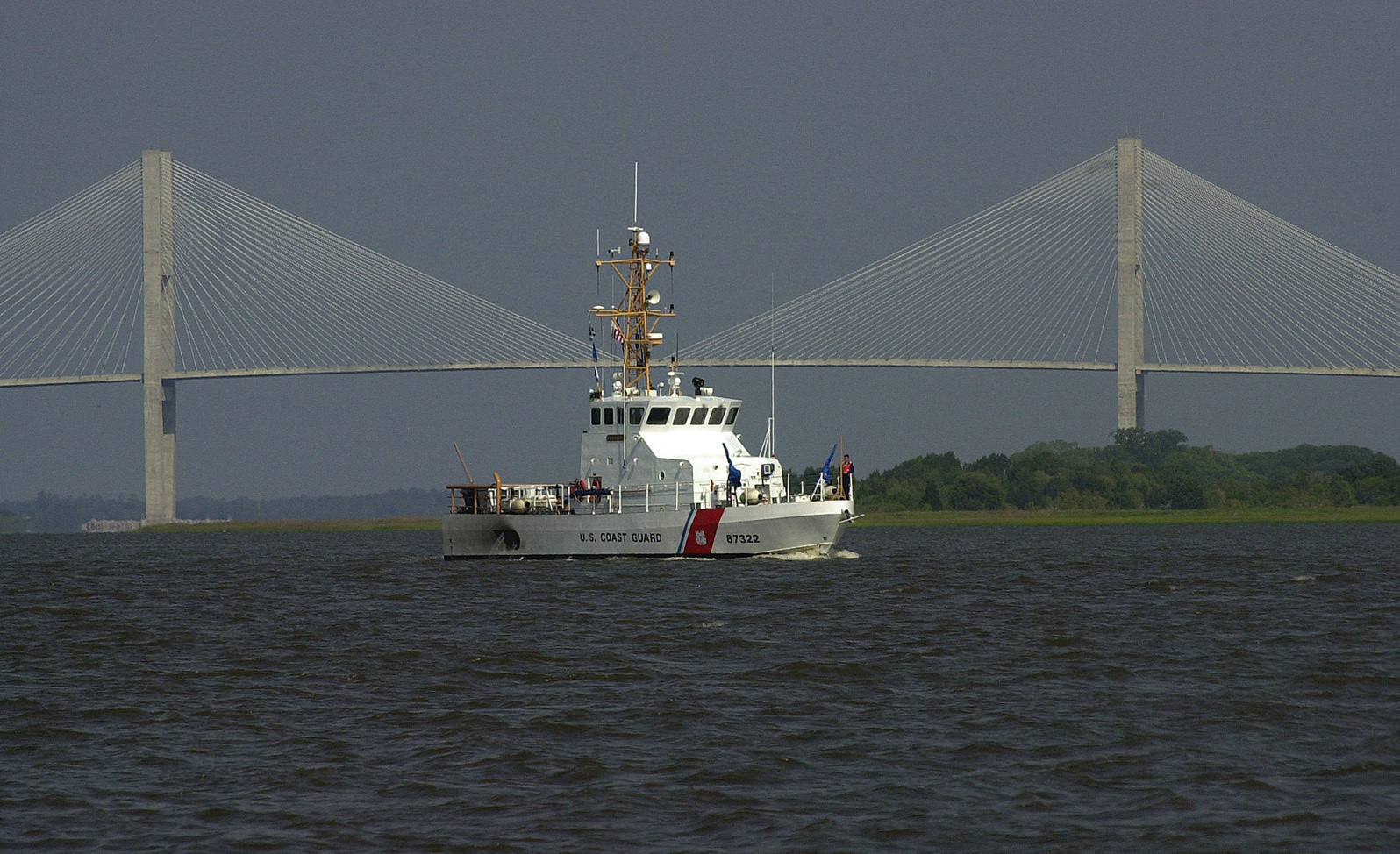
- Kingfisher patrols in front of the Sidney Lanier Bridge in Brunswick, Georgia, during the 2004 G8 summit

History

United States
- Name: Kingfisher
- Namesake: Kingfisher
- Operator: United States Coast Guard
- Builder: Bollinger Shipyards, Lockport, Louisiana
- Home port: Mayport, Florida; Charleston, South Carolina (by 2025)
- Identification: Hull number: WPB-87322
- Status: In active service

General characteristics
- Class & type: Marine Protector-class patrol boat
- Length: 87 ft (27 m)

USCGC Kingfisher (WPB-87322) is an 87-foot (27 m) Marine Protector-class patrol boat of the United States Coast Guard. It was long based at Mayport near Jacksonville, Florida, where it patrolled the coast from the St. Marys River to south of Cape Canaveral. It provided waterway security for a 2003 presidential visit to Jacksonville and for the 2004 G8 summit at Sea Island, Georgia. By 2025 the cutter was based at Coast Guard Base Charleston in Charleston, South Carolina. Its missions include law enforcement, fisheries patrols, environmental protection and search and rescue.

== Design ==
Kingfisher is one of the Marine Protector-class coastal patrol boats built for the Coast Guard by Bollinger Shipyards of Lockport, Louisiana, under a contract first awarded on March 13, 1996. The class replaced the older 82-foot Point-class cutters. Its stern launching ramp lets boarding teams launch and recover the cutter's rigid-hulled inflatable boat while it is under way, with only one crew member needed on deck.

== Service history ==
From Mayport, Kingfisher's area of responsibility ran from the St. Marys River on the Florida–Georgia line to south of Cape Canaveral, and its crew also provided maritime security around Kennedy Space Center for crewed space launches.

On September 9, 2003, Kingfisher patrolled the St. Johns River in front of Alltel Stadium during President George W. Bush's visit to downtown Jacksonville. On June 4, 2004, Kingfisher, then listed at Atlantic Beach, Florida, patrolled the Brunswick River while enforcing the security zone set up for the 30th G8 summit at Sea Island, Georgia.

On June 9, 2009, Kingfisher hosted the burial at sea of a Coast Guard veteran off Jacksonville.

In November 2024 a mariner reported seeing a capsized 50-foot (15 m) catamaran about 65 miles (105 km) east of Brunswick. Two men who had been sailing it from Connecticut to St. Augustine were missing. Coast Guard Sector Charleston led the search, which used the Kingfisher and the Coho along with aircraft from several Coast Guard air stations. On November 27 the Coast Guard suspended the search after about 77 hours and more than 9,140 square miles (23,700 km^{2}).

== See also ==
- List of United States Coast Guard cutters
