= USCGC Sturgeon =

United States Coast Guard patrol boat

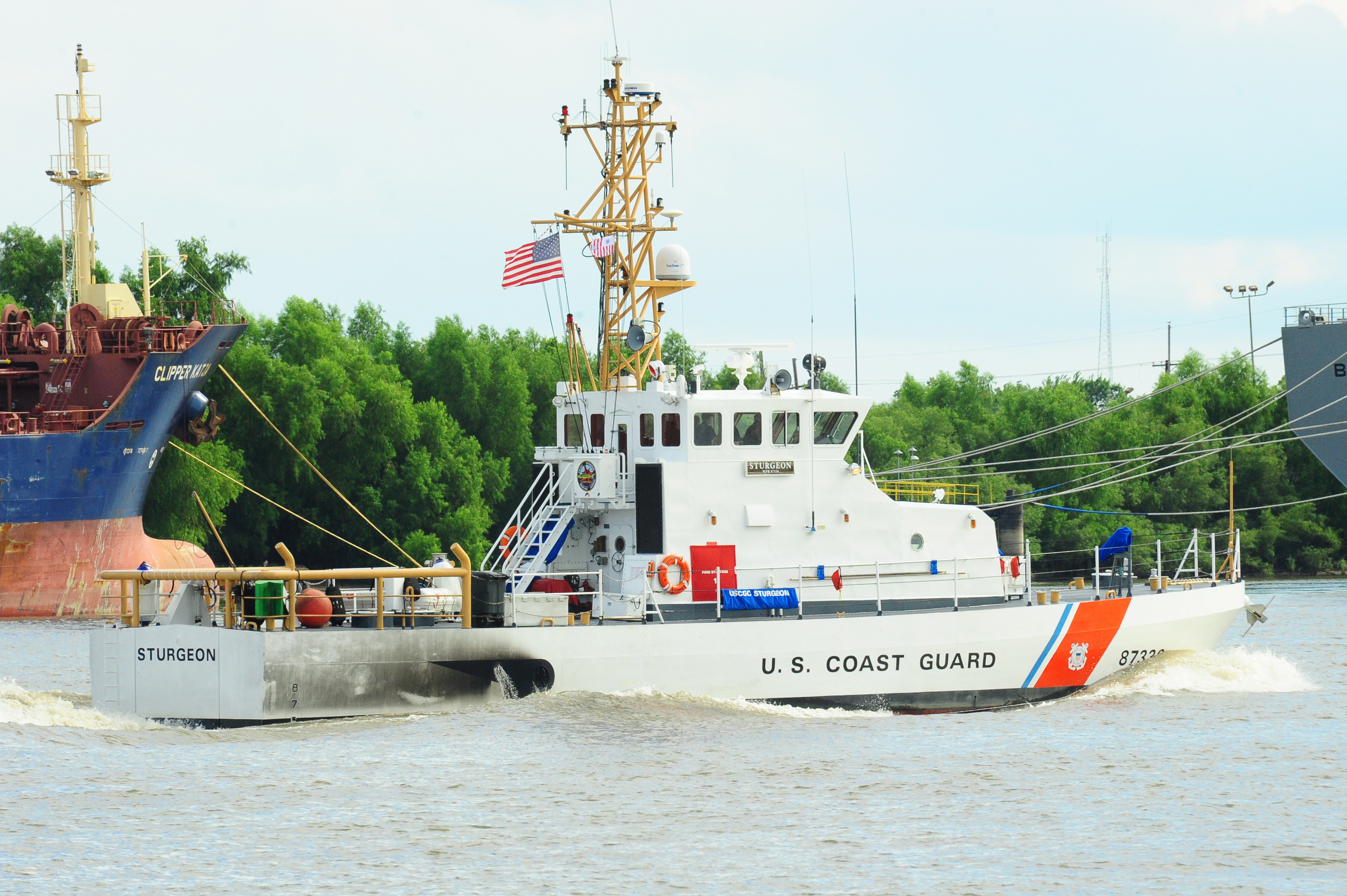
- Sturgeon provides a security zone during Homeland Security Secretary Janet Napolitano's tour of the port of New Orleans, August 2011

History

United States
- Name: Sturgeon
- Namesake: Sturgeon
- Operator: United States Coast Guard
- Builder: Bollinger Shipyards, Lockport, Louisiana
- Launched: May 29, 2001
- Commissioned: September 28, 2001
- Home port: Grand Isle, Louisiana
- Identification: Hull number: WPB-87336
- Status: In active service

General characteristics
- Class & type: Marine Protector-class patrol boat
- Length: 87 ft (27 m)

USCGC Sturgeon (WPB-87336) is an 87-foot (27 m) Marine Protector-class of the United States Coast Guard. Commissioned in September 2001, it was homeported at Coast Guard Station Grand Isle in Grand Isle, Louisiana on the Louisiana Gulf coast. It has worked on the lower Mississippi River, providing security for a 2011 visit by Homeland Security Secretary Janet Napolitano and delivering relief supplies after Hurricane Isaac in 2012.

== Design ==
Sturgeon is one of the Marine Protector-class coastal patrol boats built for the Coast Guard by Bollinger Shipyards of Lockport, Louisiana, under a contract first awarded on March 13, 1996. The class replaced the older 82-foot Point-class cutters. Sturgeon was launched on May 29, 2001. It entered service in a special commissioning on August 7, 2001, and was fully commissioned on September 28, 2001.

== Service history ==
On August 8, 2011, Sturgeon enforced a security zone during a tour of the port of New Orleans for Secretary of Homeland Security Janet Napolitano. The Coast Guard oversees the Mississippi River port system, one of the largest in the world.

After Hurricane Isaac flooded the region in August 2012, Sturgeon's crew loaded ice, water and ready-to-eat meals at the ferry landing in Belle Chasse on August 31. The cutter then traveled down the Mississippi to Venice to deliver the supplies to residents.

In June 2020 Coast Guard watchstanders in Corpus Christi sent Sturgeon to help a 32-foot (9.8 m) boat with three people aboard that had lost steering about 46 miles (74 km) offshore. The cutter's crew towed the boat toward Coast Guard Station South Padre Island, where a station response boat took over and brought it back to South Padre Island.

== See also ==
- List of United States Coast Guard cutters
