= USCGC Sea Otter =

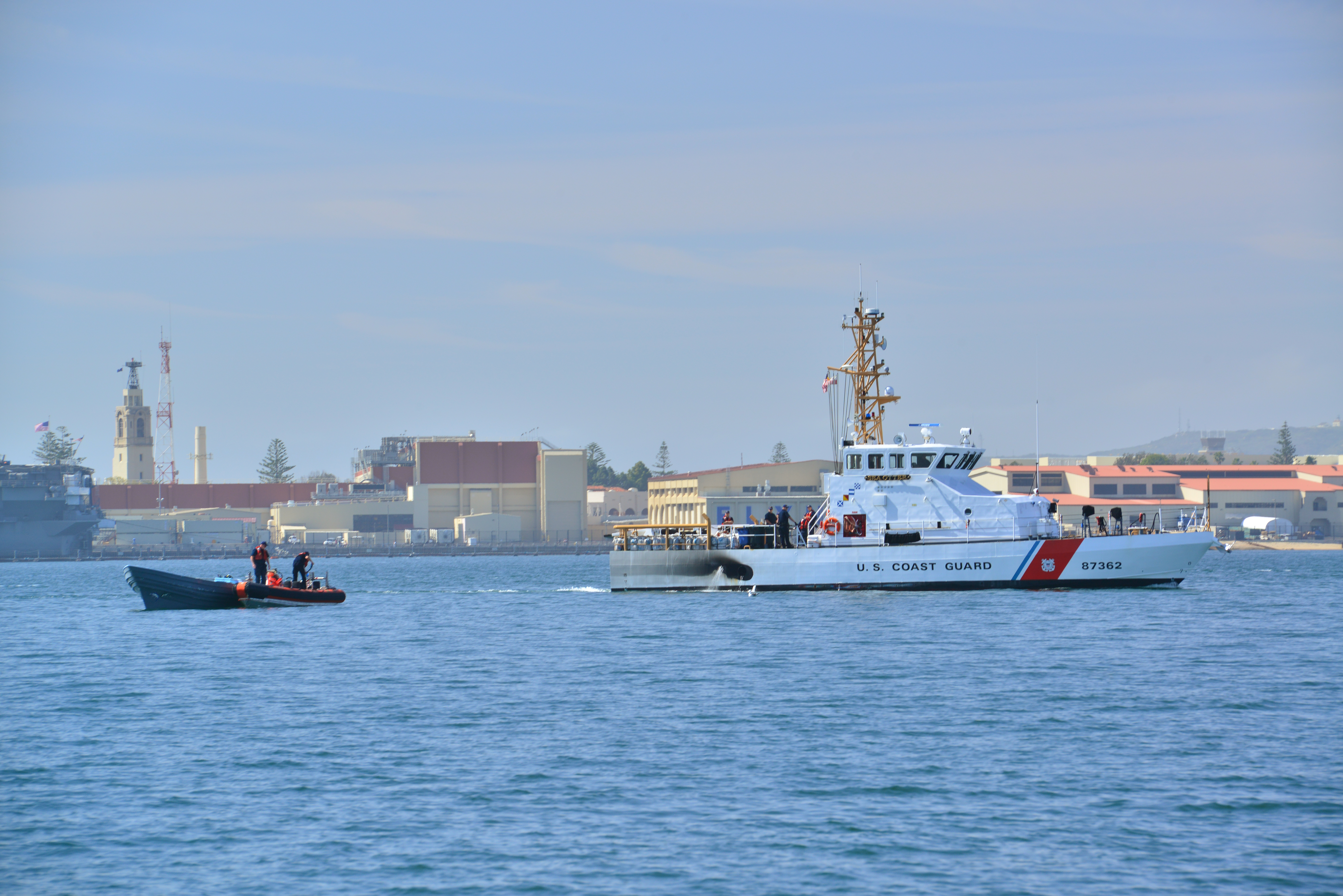
- Sea Otter returns with 1.5 tons of seized marijuana

History

United States
- Name: USCGC Sea Otter
- Builder: Bollinger Shipyards
- Home port: San Diego, California, U.S.
- Identification: MMSI number: 366999637; Callsign: NJOM
- Status: in active service

General characteristics
- Displacement: 91 long tons (92 t)
- Length: 87 ft 0 in (26.5 m)
- Beam: 19 ft 5 in (5.9 m)
- Draft: 5 ft 7 in (1.7 m)
- Propulsion: 2 x MTU diesels
- Speed: 25 knots (46 km/h)
- Range: 900 nmi (1,700 km)
- Endurance: 5 days
- Complement: 10
- Armament: 2 × .50 caliber M2 Browning machine guns

USCGC Sea Otter (WPB-87362) is the 61st cutter in the United States Coast Guard's successful Marine Protector class.

== Design ==
The 87-foot (27 m) Sea Otter incorporates several features not present in the Coast Guard's earlier cutters. The class are equipped with a stern launching ramp, that allows the vessel to deploy or retrieve it waterjet propelled pursuit boat, without having to stop. The Coast Guard had a new initiative, when the class was designed, that all its cutters, even the smallest, like the Marine Protector, should be able to accommodate mixed sex crews.

She displaces approximately 90 long tons (91 t), and her top speed is approximately 24 knots (44 km/h). The class is designed for missions lasting up to three days. Marine Protector cutters are lightly armed, with all but the four owned by the US Navy mounting a main armament of a pair of crew-served fifty caliber Browning machine guns, on either side of their foredecks.

Cutters like Sea Otter are assigned to perform search and rescue, intercept drug smugglers and people smugglers, provide a front line response to disasters, and perform routine constabulary duties.

== Operational history ==
On February 7, 2013, Sea Otter and USCGC Waesche came to the assistance of a 60-foot (18 m) pleasure craft, Tioga, which was sinking, in heavy swells, 35 miles (56 km) south of San Clemente Island.

On March 11, 2015, Sea Otter helped intercept a small boat, carrying over 1.3 tons of marijuana.
