= USCGC Tarpon =

United States Coast Guard patrol boat

- Tarpon departs Jacksonville, Florida in 2022

History

United States
- Name: Tarpon
- Namesake: Tarpon
- Operator: United States Coast Guard
- Builder: Bollinger Shipyards, Lockport, Louisiana
- Launched: May 10, 1999
- Commissioned: October 22, 1999
- Home port: Tybee Island, Georgia
- Identification: Hull number: WPB-87310

General characteristics
- Class & type: Marine Protector-class patrol boat
- Length: 87 ft (27 m)

USCGC Tarpon (WPB-87310) is a former 87-foot (27 m) Marine Protector-class of the United States Coast Guard. Commissioned in October 1999, it is based at Tybee Island, Georgia, near Savannah, and patrolled the coasts of Georgia and South Carolina.

== Design ==
Tarpon is one of the Marine Protector-class coastal patrol boats built for the Coast Guard by Bollinger Shipyards of Lockport, Louisiana, under a contract first awarded on March 13, 1996. The class replaced the older 82-foot Point-class cutters. Tarpon was launched on May 10, 1999, and commissioned on October 22, 1999.

== Service history ==
In May 2006 a 27-foot (8.2 m) charter fishing boat with seven people aboard was reported missing off Murrells Inlet, South Carolina. Tarpon was called in from Tybee Island to help a Coast Guard helicopter, a C-130 aircraft and a boat from Station Georgetown in the search.

In late 2006 a crew member aboard a 58-foot (18 m) sailboat about 50 miles (80 km) off Savannah fell severely ill in 7-foot (2.1 m) seas. A helicopter from Air Station Savannah hoisted her and flew her to Hunter Army Airfield for treatment in Savannah. Tarpon then took the sailboat in tow and brought the two remaining crew members safely to Brunswick, Georgia.

== See also ==
- Marine Protector-class patrol boat
- List of United States Coast Guard cutters
