= USCGC Sea Lion =

United States Coast Guard patrol boat

History

United States
- Name: Sea Lion
- Namesake: Sea lion
- Operator: United States Coast Guard
- Builder: Bollinger Shipyards, Lockport, Louisiana
- Completed: November 2003
- In service: March 13, 2004
- Home port: Bellingham, Washington
- Identification: Hull number: WPB-87352
- Status: In active service

General characteristics
- Class & type: Marine Protector-class patrol boat
- Length: 87 ft (27 m)
- Complement: 10 (2004)

USCGC Sea Lion (WPB-87352) is an 87-foot (27 m) Marine Protector-class patrol boat of the United States Coast Guard, based at Bellingham, Washington. Placed in service in March 2004 as the 51st boat of its class, it patrols Puget Sound, the Salish Sea and the Strait of Juan de Fuca. Its missions include law enforcement, search and rescue, fisheries inspections and marine environmental response.

== Design ==
Sea Lion was built by Bollinger Shipyards of Lockport, Louisiana and completed in November 2003. Bollinger built the Marine Protector class under a contract first awarded on March 13, 1996. The class replaced the older 82-foot Point-class cutters. When it entered service, Sea Lion had a crew of ten.

== Service history ==
=== Entry into service ===
Sea Lion was placed in service on March 13, 2004, at a ceremony in Bellingham. It was the 51st Marine Protector-class cutter built for the Coast Guard. Sea Lion shares its Bellingham homeport with the patrol boat Terrapin. Both are berthed at Fairhaven.

== See also ==
- List of United States Coast Guard cutters
