= Marine Protector-class patrol boat =

United States Coast Guard ship class

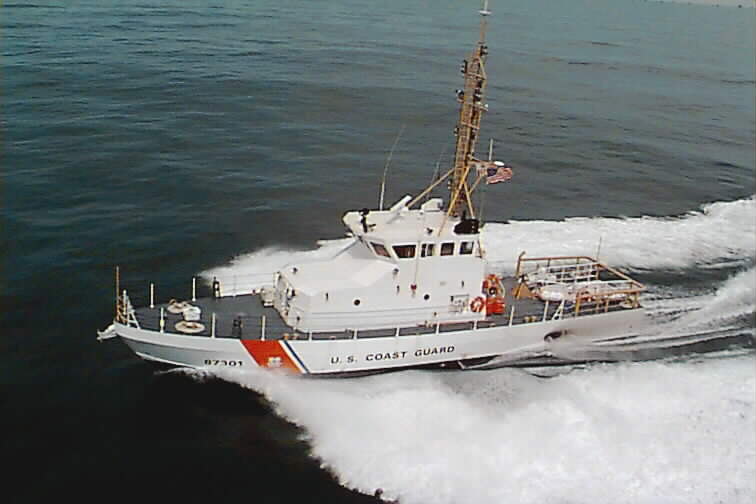
- The class leader USCGC Barracuda underway. Note the boat launching ramp at the stern. The fifty caliber machine guns mount on pintles, port and starboard, just forward of the red stripe. The black smudge in the hull abaft the superstructure is the exhaust of the port engine.

Class overview
- Name: Marine Protector-class
- Builders: Bollinger Shipyards, Lockport, Louisiana
- Operators: United States Coast Guard; Ghana Navy; Lebanese Navy; Philippines Coast Guard; National Navy of Uruguay
- Preceded by: Point-class
- In commission: 1998–present
- Completed: 77
- Canceled: 0
- Active: 72
- Retired: 6

General characteristics
- Displacement: 91 long tons (204,000 lb; 92,000 kg)
- Length: 87 ft (27 m)
- Beam: 19 ft 5 in (5.92 m)
- Draft: 5 ft 7 in (1.70 m)
- Propulsion: 2 x MTU diesel engines
- Speed: Over 25 knots (46 km/h; 29 mph)
- Range: 900 nmi (1,000 mi; 1,700 km)
- Endurance: 3 days
- Complement: 10
- Sensors & processing systems: 1 x AN/SPS-73 surface search radar
- Armament: 2 × .50 caliber M2 Browning machine guns

The Marine Protector-class patrol boat is a type of coastal patrol boat of the United States Coast Guard. The 87-foot-long (27 m) vessels with hull based on the Stan 2600 design by Damen Group. The vessels were built by Bollinger Shipyards of Lockport, Louisiana. Almost all of these boats have been delivered to the U.S. Coast Guard, which has named them after sea creatures that fly or swim. Four have been delivered to Malta and Yemen.

== History ==
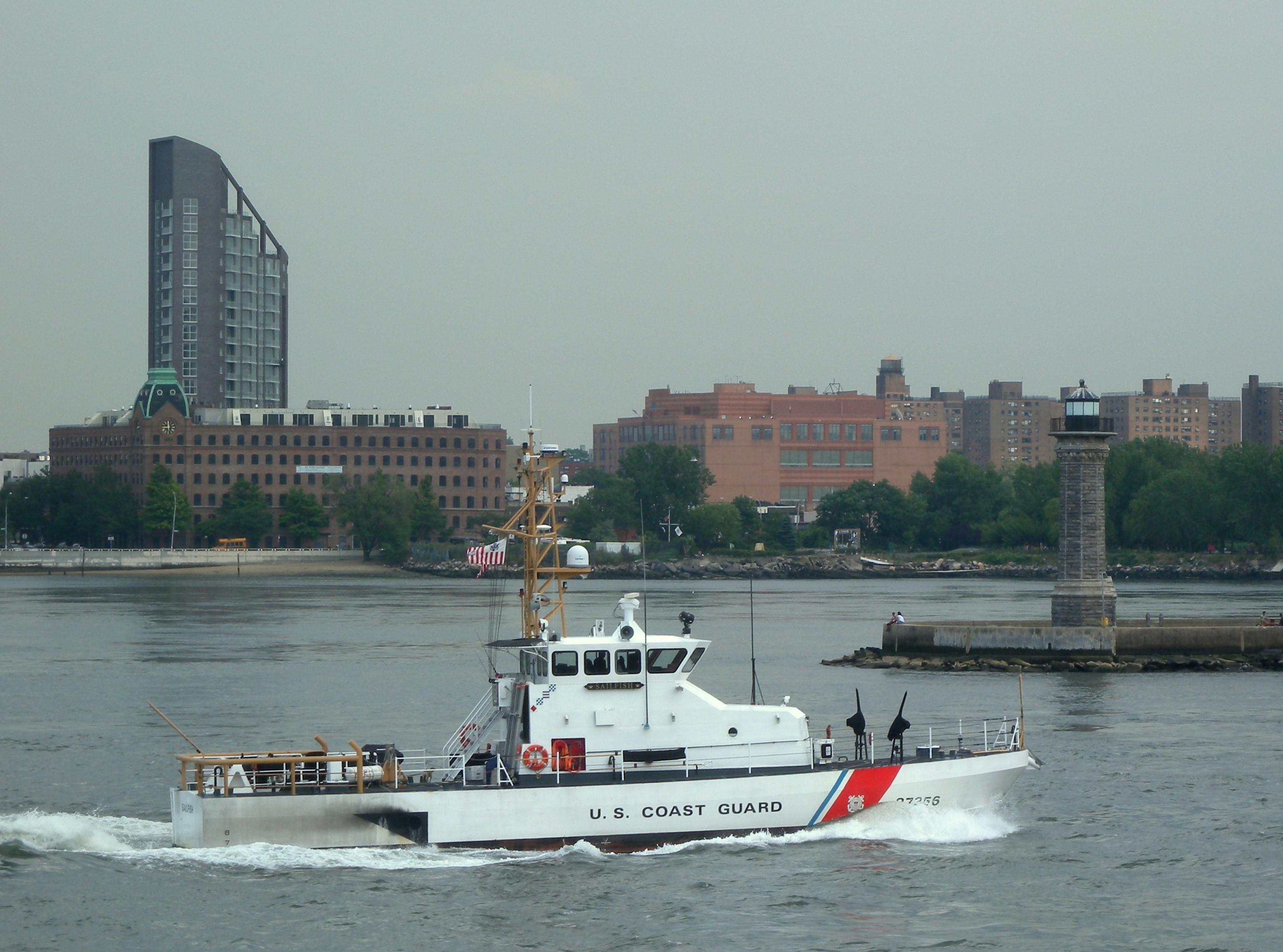
USCGC Sailfish in New York City

Tour of USCGC Haddock, c. 2020

The Coast Guard placed its original order in 1999 for 50 boats, which were delivered by mid-2002. Several additional orders brought the class to a total of 77 ships. Seventy-five were delivered under the original Coast Guard contract with Bollinger, with the last, USCGC Sea Fox, being completed in October 2009. Two of these were delivered to the Maritime Squadron of Malta. A separate Coast Guard contract built two additional patrol boats for the Yemen Coast Guard.

The Marine Protector class replaced the 82-foot Point class, which had smaller accommodations and had to stop to deploy its pursuit inflatable boat via crane. The last Point-class cutter was decommissioned in 2003.

In 2020, the Department of Homeland Security began to decommission the fleet, with eight Marine Protector cutters replaced by newer Sentinel class cutters.

In May 2021, the United States announced that it would send three decommissioned ships to the Lebanese Navy

In 2022, three decommissioned ships, Albacore, Cochito, and Gannet were donated to the Uruguayan Navy under the Excess Defense Articles program. As part of the transfer deal, Uruguay spent $4.99 million to refurbish the ships, on spare parts, and to train their crews. They were renamed Rio Arapey, Rio De La Plata, and Rio Yaguaron.

In 2023, the United States delivered two former Coast Guard Marine Protector-class ships to the Ghanaian Navy. They were commissioned as GNS Aflao and GNS Half Assini.

In May 2023, the United States government pledged to provide the Philippines at least two Marine Protector vessels, as well as two Island-class patrol boat and three Lockheed C-130H Hercules during President Bongbong Marcos' visit to Washington, D.C.

== General characteristics ==
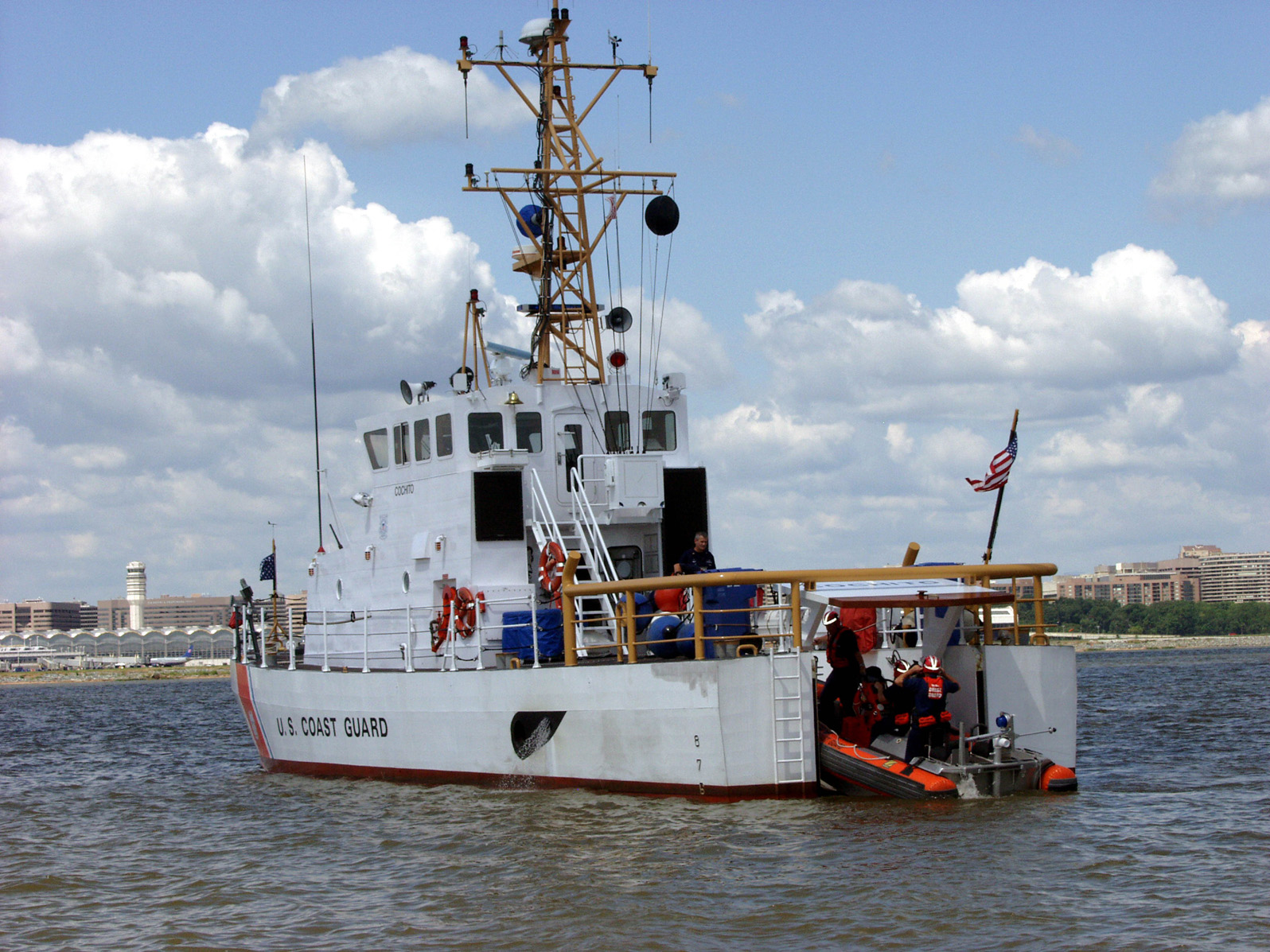
USCGC Cochito launching a small boat from the stern ramp

Missions include combating drug smuggling, illegal immigration, marine fisheries enforcement and search and rescue support. Since the September 11, 2001 attacks, many have had a homeland security mission in the form of ports, waterways and coastal security (PWCS) patrols.

Boarding parties can be launched while the vessel is underway through the cutter's stern launching ramp. The attached rigid hull inflatable boat (RHIB) has been upgraded in an effort to increase speed and sea state sustainability for boarding parties and rescue and assistance teams. The stern launching system requires only a single crew member to remain on deck to launch or retrieve the boarding party.

The vessels consume approximately 165 gallons of diesel per hour at their maximum speed of 26 knots (48 km/h; 30 mph).

Like all new U.S. Coast Guard vessels, the Marine Protector class is designed to accommodate crews of mixed gender with five separate small berthing spaces accommodating standard crews of ten with maximum berthing for 12.

Sea Devil and Sea Fox are assigned to guard a United States Navy submarine base in Kings Bay, Georgia, replacing the decommissioned Sea Dragon and Sea Dog at that station. Sea Devil and Sea Fox earlier guarded another submarine base in Bangor, Washington. An additional machine gun operated by remote control was added to all four for this duty.

== Boats in class ==
Image	Name	Hull Number	Homeport	Status
	USCGC Barracuda	WPB-87301	Eureka, California	Active
	USCGC Hammerhead	WPB-87302	Woods Hole, Massachusetts	
	USCGC Mako	WPB-87303	Cape May, New Jersey	
	USCGC Marlin	WPB-87304	Fort Myers Beach, Florida	Decommissioned and transferred to Philippine Coast Guard in 2026. Renamed BRP Pag-asa (PATS-2701).
	USCGC Stingray	WPB-87305	Mobile, Alabama	
	USCGC Dorado	WPB-87306	Crescent City, California	Decommissioned on 25 May 2021. Donated to the Lebanese navy.
	USCGC Osprey	WPB-87307	Port Townsend, Washington	
	USCGC Chinook	WPB-87308	New London, Connecticut	
	USCGC Albacore	WPB-87309	New London, Connecticut	Decommissioned on 6 April 2021. Donated to Uruguay, renamed ROU Rio Arapey.
	USCGC Tarpon	WPB-87310	Tybee Island, Georgia	Decommissioned, transferred to MCAS Cherry Point
	USCGC Cobia	WPB-87311	Mobile, Alabama	
	USCGC Hawksbill	WPB-87312	Monterey, California	
	USCGC Cormorant	WPB-87313	South Padre Island, Texas	Decommissioned
	USCGC Finback	WPB-87314	Cape May, New Jersey	
	USCGC Amberjack	WPB-87315	South Padre Island, Texas	
	USCGC Kittiwake	WPB-87316	Honolulu, Hawaii	Decommissioned on 7 June 2021.
	USCGC Blackfin	WPB-87317	Santa Barbara, California	
	USCGC Bluefin	WPB-87318	Fort Pierce, Florida	Decommissioned and transferred to Philippine Coast Guard in 2026. Renamed BRP Patag (PATS-2702).
	USCGC Yellowfin	WPB-87319	Charleston, South Carolina	
	USCGC Manta	WPB-87320	Freeport, Texas	Decommissioned on 7 June 2021. Donated to the Lebanese navy.
	USCGC Coho	WPB-87321	Panama City, Florida	
	USCGC Kingfisher	WPB-87322	Mayport, Florida	
	USCGC Seahawk	WPB-87323		
	USCGC Steelhead	WPB-87324	Port Aransas, Texas	
	USCGC Beluga	WPB-87325	Little Creek, Virginia	
	USCGC Blacktip	WPB-87326	Oxnard, California	
	USCGC Pelican	WPB-87327	Abbeville, Louisiana	
	USCGC Ridley	WPB-87328	Montauk, New York	
	USCGC Cochito	WPB-87329	Little Creek, Virginia	Decommissioned on 11 May 2021. Donated to Uruguay, renamed ROU Rio De La Plata.
	USCGC Manowar	WPB-87330	Mobile, Alabama	
	USCGC Moray	WPB-87331	Jonesport, Maine	
	USCGC Razorbill	WPB-87332	Gulfport, Mississippi	
	USCGC Adelie	WPB-87333	Port Angeles, Washington	
	USCGC Gannet	WPB-87334	Dania, Florida	Decommissioned on 20 April 2021. Donated to Uruguay, renamed ROU Rio Yaguaron.
	USCGC Narwhal	WPB-87335	Corona Del Mar, California	
	USCGC Sturgeon	WPB-87336	Grand Isle, Louisiana	
	USCGC Sockeye	WPB-87337	Bodega Bay, California	
	USCGC Ibis	WPB-87338	Cape May, New Jersey	
	USCGC Pompano	WPB-87339	Gulfport, Mississippi	
	USCGC Halibut	WPB-87340	Marina Del Rey, California	
	USCGC Bonito	WPB-87341	Pensacola, Florida	
	USCGC Shrike	WPB-87342	Port Canaveral, Florida	
	USCGC Tern	WPB-87343	San Francisco, California	
	USCGC Heron	WPB-87344	Sabine Pass, Texas	
	USCGC Wahoo	WPB-87345	Port Angeles, Washington	
	USCGC Flying Fish	WPB-87346	Boston, Massachusetts	
	USCGC Haddock	WPB-87347	San Diego, California	
	USCGC Brant	WPB-87348	Corpus Christi, Texas	Decommissioned on 17 March 2022
	USCGC Shearwater	WPB-87349	Portsmouth, Virginia	Decommissioned on 27 April 2021. Donated to the Lebanese navy.
	USCGC Petrel	WPB-87350	San Diego, California	
		P51		Hull number 87351 was assigned to a vessel that was given to the Malta Maritime Squadron, where it became P51.
		P52		Malta Maritime Squadron P52
	USCGC Sea Lion	WPB-87352	Bellingham, Washington	
	USCGC Skipjack	WPB-87353	Galveston, Texas	
	USCGC Dolphin	WPB-87354	Miami, Florida	
	USCGC Hawk	WPB-87355	St. Petersburg, Florida	
	USCGC Sailfish	WPB-87356	Sandy Hook, New Jersey	
	USCGC Sawfish	WPB-87357	Key West, Florida	
	USCGC Swordfish	WPB-87358	Port Angeles, Washington	
	USCGC Tiger Shark	WPB-87359	Newport, Rhode Island	
	USCGC Blue Shark	WPB-87360	Everett, Washington	
	USCGC Sea Horse	WPB-87361	Portsmouth, Virginia	
	USCGC Sea Otter	WPB-87362	San Diego, California	
	USCGC Manatee	WPB-87363	Corpus Christi, Texas	
	USCGC Ahi	WPB-87364	Honolulu, Hawaii	Decommissioned on 7 June 2021.
	USCGC Pike	WPB-87365	Petersburg, Alaska	
	USCGC Terrapin	WPB-87366	Bellingham, Washington	
	USCGC Sea Dragon	WPB-87367		Decommissioned 29 May 2024 at St. Marys, Georgia and transferred to MCAS Cherry Point, North Carolina.
	USCGC Sea Devil	WPB-87368	Kings Bay, Georgia	In active service as of May 29, 2024.
	USCGC Crocodile	WPB-87369	St Petersburg, Florida	
	USCGC Diamondback	WPB-87370	Miami Beach, Florida	
	USCGC Reef Shark	WPB-87371	Juneau, Alaska	
	USCGC Alligator	WPB-87372	St. Petersburg, Florida	
	USCGC Sea Dog	WPB-87373		Decommissioned 29 May 2024 at St. Marys, Georgia and transferred to MCAS Cherry Point, North Carolina.
	USCGC Sea Fox	WPB-87374	Kings Bay, Georgia	In active service as of May 29, 2024.
	Sana'a			Yemen Coast Guard vessel. Reportedly sunk by a mine on 9 March 2017.
	Aden			Yemen Coast Guard vessel.
