= USCGC Barracuda =

U.S. Coast Guard patrol boat

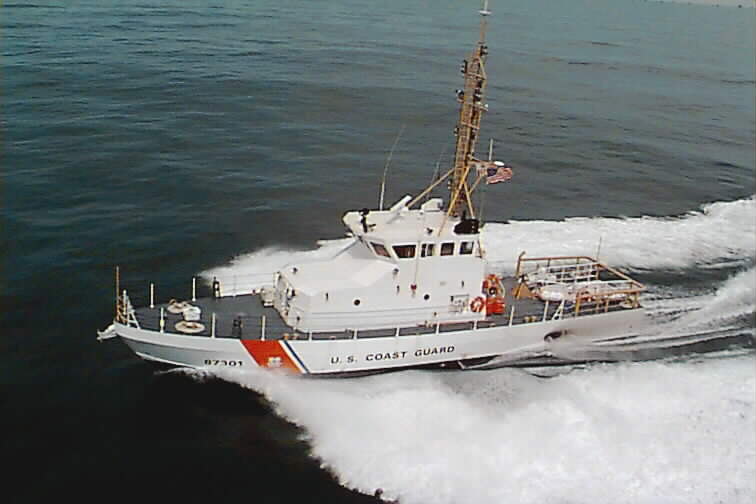

History

United States
- Name: Barracuda
- Operator: United States Coast Guard
- Builder: Bollinger Shipyards
- Launched: April 7, 1998
- Identification: Hull number: WPB-87301
- Status: In service

General characteristics
- Class & type: Marine Protector-class patrol boat
- Length: 87 ft (27 m)
- Speed: 25 knots (46 km/h; 29 mph)
- Range: 900 nmi (1,700 km; 1,000 mi)
- Complement: 11

USCGC Barracuda is an 87-foot (27 m) Marine Protector-class patrol boat of the United States Coast Guard. The vessel is the first of her class and named after the ray-finned fish of the same name. Since her commissioning, the vessel has been stationed at Eureka, California under Coast Guard District 11, Sector Humbolt Bay. Her duties include law enforcement, Search and rescue (SAR), and environmental protection.

== Design ==
The ship, as well as all other vessels of the class, were built by Bollinger Shipyards in Lockport, Louisiana. She was completed and launched on April 7, 1998, reportedly costing $9 million (1998). She has a total length of 87 feet (27 m) with a beam of 17 feet (5.2 m) and a draft of 6 feet (1.8 m) at full load. She displaces 91 long tons (92 t) at full load. The vessel is powered by twin diesel engines driving two shafts, generating a total of 2,680 brake horsepower (2,000 kW) for a top speed of 25 knots (46 km/h; 29 mph). It has a range of approximately 900 nautical miles (1,700 km; 1,000 mi) and is served by a crew of 11 coastguardsmen. She is armed with two .50-caliber machine guns. The vessel features a rear ramp for deploying an aluminum-hulled rigid inflatable boat without a crane. She is rated for a sea state of 5 and can comfortably operate in rough seas. The vessel features advanced electronics for tracking potential criminal or threatening behavior on the high seas.

== Service history ==
Since her commissioning, the vessel has been stationed at Eureka, California under Coast Guard District 11, Sector Humbolt Bay. Her duties include law enforcement, Search and rescue (SAR), and environmental protection.

On May 22, 2000, the vessel was involved in a rescue involving the 72-foot (22 m) fishing vessel Leslie Lee, roughly nine miles (14 km) off of the coast Trinidad Head, California. While the vessel was on a training mission, taking advantage of the rough seas, they received an emergency signal from the fishing vessel requesting assistance as they began to capsize. The patrol boat coordinated with an HH-65A Dolphin helicopter from Air Station Humboldt Bay. The operation successfully saved two crew from the hull of the ship while a third survivor was hoisted from open seas. The vessel sank with roughly 10,000 US gallons (38,000 L; 8,300 imp gal) of diesel fuel in 1,800 feet (550 m) of water.

On July 22, 2018, while on routine patrol in the North Pacific, the cutter spotted a seemingly abandoned ship hundreds of miles off the coast of Grays Harbor, Washington, the 46-foot sailboat Kelaerin. She alerted surrounding vessels, and the crew who had abandoned the ship were ultimately rescued safely. The cutter towed the adrift sailboat to Fort Bragg, California.
