= USCGC Sockeye =

United States Coast Guard patrol boat

- Sockeye under way in its homeport of Bodega Bay, California, in March 2025

History

United States
- Name: Sockeye
- Namesake: Sockeye salmon
- Operator: United States Coast Guard
- Builder: Bollinger Shipyards, Lockport, Louisiana
- Launched: June 26, 2001
- Completed: 2001–2002
- Commissioned: September 4, 2001 (special)
- Home port: Bodega Bay, California
- Identification: Hull number: WPB-87337
- Nickname(s): "Riders on the Storm"
- Status: In active service

General characteristics
- Class & type: Marine Protector-class patrol boat
- Length: 87 ft (27 m)
- Beam: 19 ft (5.8 m)
- Propulsion: Twin diesel engines

USCGC Sockeye (WPB-87337) is an 87-foot (27 m) Marine Protector-class of the United States Coast Guard, based at Bodega Bay, California, north of San Francisco. It was the 37th boat of its class. Assigned to Coast Guard Sector San Francisco, it patrols the Northern California coast from Mendocino County south to Big Sur and up to 200 miles (320 km) offshore. It also often works in the San Francisco Bay. Its crew coordinated the response to the 2008 brush fires on Angel Island and supported the response to the 2007 Cosco Busan oil spill.

== Design ==
Sockeye is one of the Marine Protector-class coastal patrol boats built for the Coast Guard by Bollinger Shipyards of Lockport, Louisiana, under a contract first awarded on March 13, 1996. The class replaced the older 82-foot Point-class cutters. It was launched on June 26, 2001, and entered service in a special commissioning on September 4, 2001. Sockeye and its San Francisco sister ship Tern were built in Louisiana in 2001–2002. Both boats have a 19-foot (5.8 m) beam and twin diesel engines.

== Service history ==
In 2005 Sockeye escorted a Russian tall ship during a procession on San Francisco Bay. On January 10, 2007, the 309-foot (94 m) barge Cascade was damaged when it struck the protective fender system of the Richmond–San Rafael Bridge. Sockeye enforced a 100-yard (91 m) safety zone around the barge.

On November 7, 2007, the container ship Cosco Busan struck the fender system of the San Francisco–Oakland Bay Bridge, spilling 58,000 US gallons (220 m^{3}) of oil into the bay. On November 12, Captain David Swatland, deputy commander of Coast Guard Sector San Francisco, briefed reporters aboard Sockeye as they viewed the beach cleanup and the damage to the bridge's fenders.

On October 12, 2008, a brush fire broke out on Angel Island and Sockeye served as on-scene coordinator for the response. Coast Guard Station Golden Gate ferried firefighters and equipment to and from the island with the Tiburon Fire Department and Station San Francisco enforced a 100-yard (91 m) security zone around the island.

On March 1, 2011, Vice Admiral Manson K. Brown, commander of the Coast Guard's Pacific Area, toured Sockeye at Bodega Bay with its officer in charge, Master Chief Petty Officer Gregory Teagle. A 2013 Coast Guard feature article on the cutter was titled "Riders on the Storm", a nickname for its crew. Its boarding teams enforce federal laws and regulations at sea, including inspections of fishing vessels.

At 2:55 p.m. on April 13, 2013, the tug Delta Captain sent a distress call before sinking off Big Sur. The Coast Guard sent Sockeye, a motor lifeboat from Station Monterey and a helicopter from Air Station San Francisco. The helicopter crew found the four survivors in a life raft and hoisted them aboard. None were injured.

== See also ==
- Marine Protector-class patrol boat
- List of United States Coast Guard cutters
