= USCGC Cochito =

Marine Protector-class patrol boat

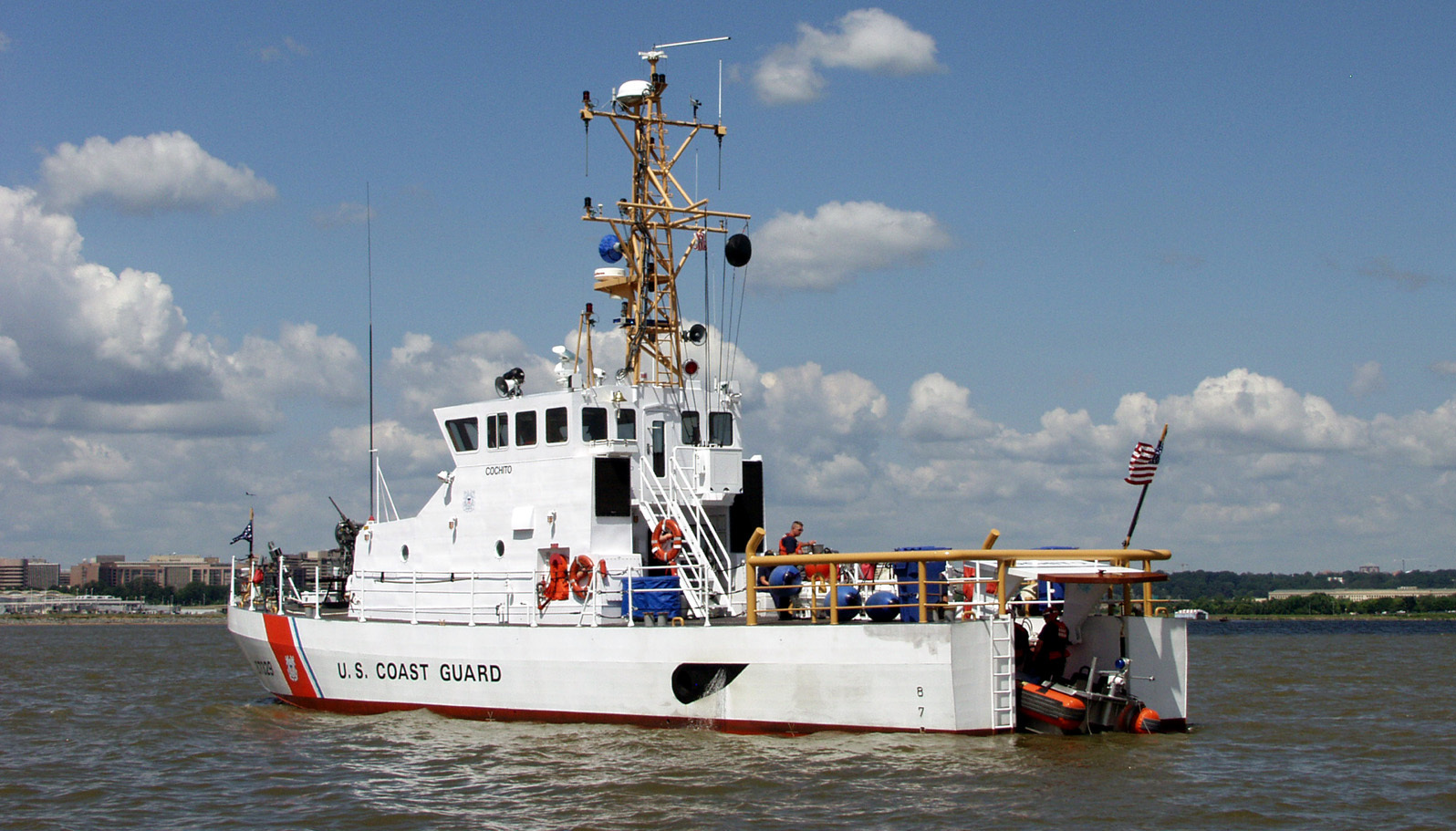
- The Cochito is able to deploy and retrieve her high-speed pursuit boat from her stern launching ramp, without bringing the vessel to a halt.

History

United States
- Name: USCGC Cochito
- Builder: Bollinger Shipyards, Lockport, Louisiana
- Commissioned: 2001-03-24
- Home port: Hampton Roads, Virginia
- Identification: MMSI number: 366999659
- Status: in active service

General characteristics
- Class & type: Marine Protector-class coastal patrol boat
- Displacement: 91 long tons (92 t)
- Length: 87 ft 0 in (26.5 m)
- Beam: 19 ft 5 in (5.9 m)
- Draft: 5 ft 7 in (1.7 m)
- Propulsion: 2 x MTU diesels
- Speed: 25 knots (46 km/h)
- Range: 900 nmi (1,700 km)
- Endurance: 5 days
- Complement: 10
- Armament: 2 × .50 caliber M2 Browning machine guns

The USCGC Cochito (WPB-87329) is an 87-foot (27 m) Marine Protector cutter operated by the United States Coast Guard.

== Design ==
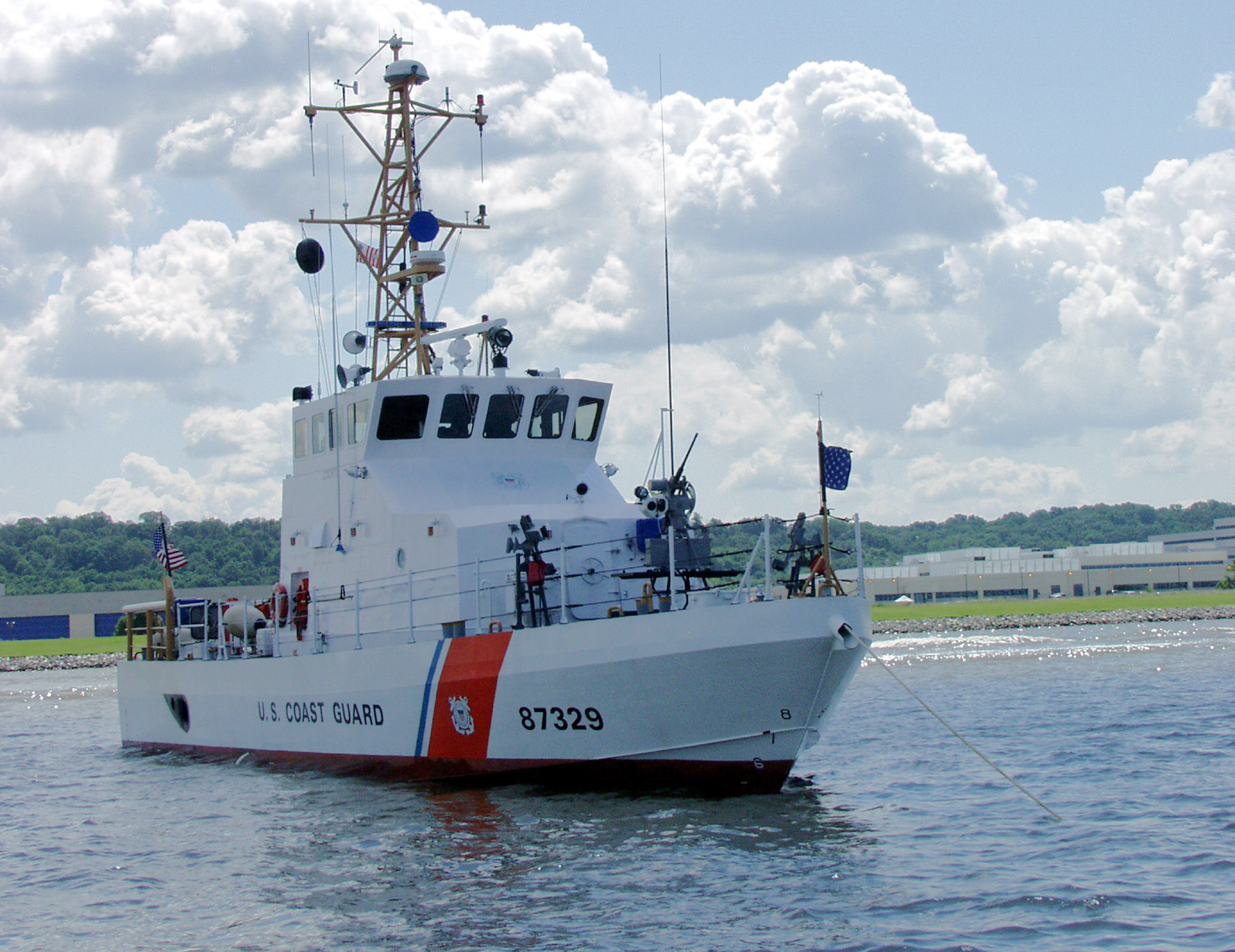
The Cochito's main armament are Browning M2 machine guns, mounted on her foredeck.

The Marine Protector class of cutters is the smallest of the Coast Guard's cutters, normally carrying a crew of 10 or 11. The class is the first of its size designed to be able to accommodate crews of mixed genders. The class was the first to be equipped with a stern launching ramp, that allows the deployment or retrieval of a high speed, pursuit boat, without first bringing the cutter to a stop. Only one crew member is required on deck to assist with the deployment or retrieval.

== Operational career ==
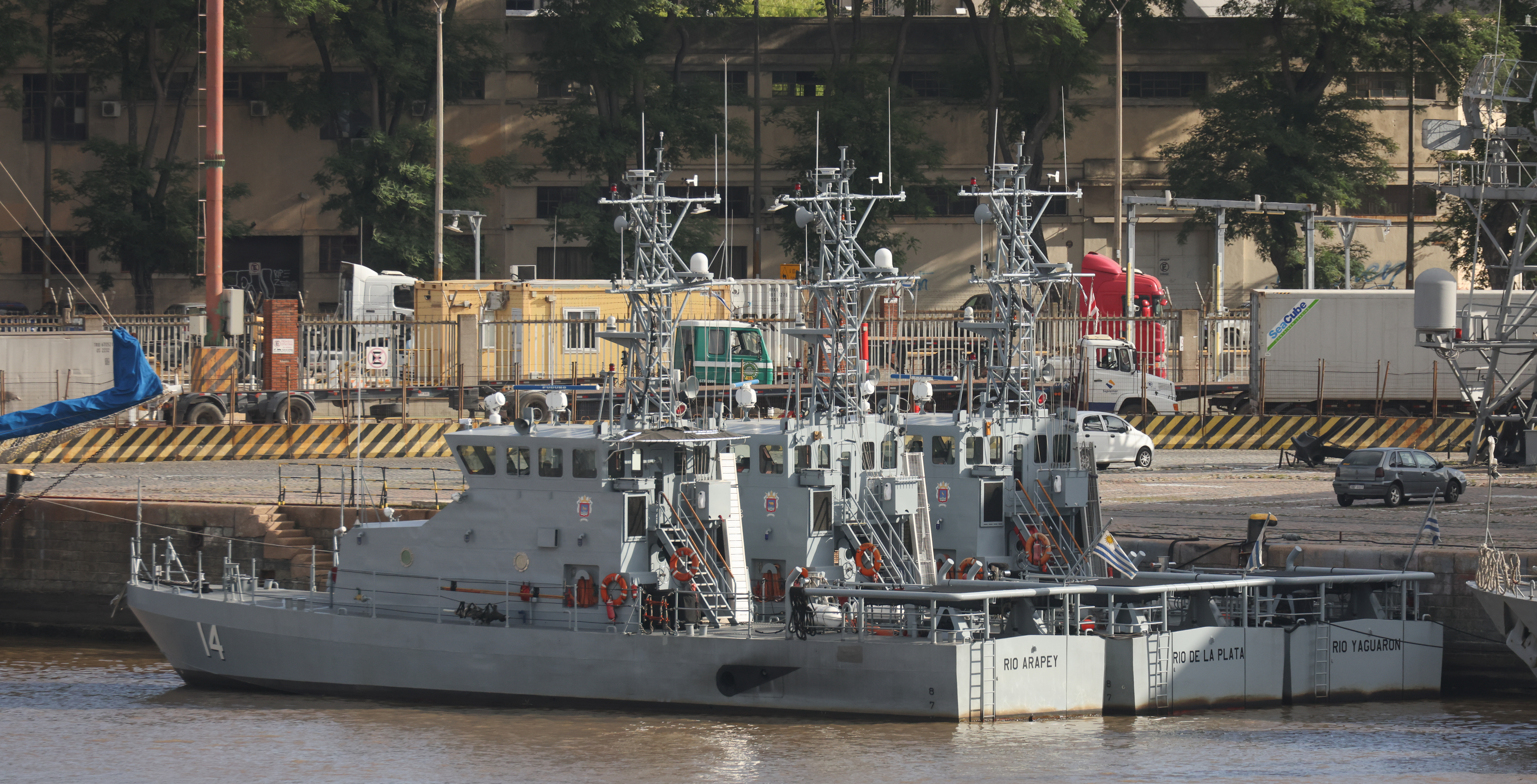
Ex-Cochito, now ROU Rio De La Plata and two other Marine Protector-class vessels of the Uruguayan Navy in 2024

The Cochito was one of the Coast Guard resources mobilized to provide security in January 2013, for President Barack Obama's inauguration.

In August 2018 the Cochito participated in a hunt for two missing boaters, for the Bahamas.

In December 2021 the Cochito and her sister ships Albacore and Gannet were donated to the Uruguayan Navy through the Excess Defense Articles program. Cochito was renamed ROU Rio De La Plata
