= USCGC Point Banks =

United States Coast Guard cutter

History

United States
- Name: USCGC Point Banks
- Owner: United States Coast Guard
- Builder: Coast Guard Yard, Curtis Bay, Maryland
- Commissioned: 13 December 1961
- Decommissioned: 26 March 1970
- Identification: WPB-8237
- Honors and awards: Navy Unit Commendation; U.S. Navy Meritorious Unit Commendation; Vietnam Service Medal with 2 silver and 1 bronze service stars
- Fate: Transferred to the South Vietnamese navy as HQ-719 on 26 March 1970

General characteristics
- Type: Patrol boat
- Displacement: 60 tons
- Length: 82 ft 10 in (25.25 m)
- Beam: 17 ft 7 in (5.36 m) max
- Draft: 5 ft 11 in (1.80 m)
- Propulsion: 2 × 600 hp (447 kW) Cummins diesel engines
- Speed: 16.8 knots (31.1 km/h; 19.3 mph)
- Range: 577 nmi (1,069 km) at 14.5 kn (26.9 km/h; 16.7 mph); 1,271 nmi (2,354 km) at 10.7 kn (19.8 km/h; 12.3 mph)
- Complement: Domestic service : 8 men; Vietnam service : 2 officers, 8 men
- Armament: 1961; 1 × Oerlikon 20 mm cannon; Vietnam service; 5 × M2 Browning machine guns; 1 × 81 mm M29 mortar

USCGC Point Banks (WPB-82327) was an 82-foot (25 m) Point-class cutter constructed at the Coast Guard Yard at Curtis Bay, Maryland in 1961 for use as a law enforcement and search and rescue patrol boat by the United States Coast Guard. Since the Coast Guard policy in 1961 was not to name cutters under 100 feet (30 m) in length it was designated as WPB-82327 when commissioned and acquired the name Point Banks in January 1964 when the Coast Guard started naming all cutters longer than 65-foot (20 m).

== Construction and design details ==
Point Banks was built to accommodate an 8-man crew. She was powered by two 600 hp (447 kW) VT600 Cummins diesel main drive engines and had two five-bladed 42 in (1,100 mm) propellers. The main drive engines were later replaced by 800 hp (597 kW) VT800 Cummins engines. Water tank capacity was 1,550 U.S. gallons (5,900 L) and fuel tank capacity was 1,840 U.S. gallons (7,000 L) at 95% full. Engine exhaust was ported through the transom rather than through a conventional stack and this permitted a 360 degree view from the bridge; a feature that was very useful in search and rescue work as well as a combat environment.

The design specifications for Point Banks included a steel hull for durability and an aluminum superstructure and longitudinally framed construction was used to save weight. Ease of operation with a small crew size was possible because of the non-manned main drive engine spaces. Controls and alarms located on the bridge allowed one man operation of the cutter thus eliminating a live engineer watch in the engine room. Because of design, four men could operate the cutter; however, the need for resting watchstanders brought the crew size to eight men for normal domestic service. The screws were designed for ease of replacement and could be changed without removing the cutter from the water. A clutch-in idle speed of 3 knots (5.6 km/h; 3.5 mph) helped to conserve fuel on lengthy patrols and an 18-knot (33 km/h; 21 mph) maximum speed could get the cutter on scene quickly. Air-conditioned interior spaces were a part of the original design for the Point-class cutter. Interior access to the deckhouse was through a watertight door on the starboard side aft of the deckhouse. The deckhouse contained the cabin for the officer-in-charge and the executive petty officer. The deckhouse also included a small arms locker, scuttlebutt, a small desk and head. Access to the lower deck and engine room was down a ladder. At the bottom of the ladder was the galley, mess and recreation deck. A watertight door at the front of the mess bulkhead led to the main crew quarters which was 10 feet (3.0 m) long and included six bunks that could be stowed, three bunks on each side. Forward of the bunks was the crew's head complete with a compact sink, shower and commode. Accommodations for a 13-man crew were installed for Vietnam service.

== History ==
After delivery in 1961, Point Banks was assigned a homeport of Woods Hole, Massachusetts, where she served as a law enforcement and search and rescue patrol boat. In March and April 1965, she escorted USS Atka, which was taking on water off New Bedford, Massachusetts.

At the request of the United States Navy, in April 1965, she was alerted for service in the Vietnam War and assigned to Coast Guard Squadron One in support of Operation Market Time along with 16 other Point-class cutters. While the crew completed overseas training and weapons qualifications at Coast Guard Island and Camp Parks, California, Point Banks was loaded onto a merchant ship, and transported to Subic Bay, Philippines in May 1965 where she was refit for combat service. Shipyard modifications included installation of new single-sideband radio equipment, additional floodlights, small arms lockers, additional sound-powered phone circuits, and the addition of four M2 machine guns. The original bow mounted machine gun was replaced with a combination over-under .50 caliber machine gun/81 mm trigger fired mortar that had been developed by the Coast Guard for service in Vietnam. For service in Vietnam, two officers were added to the crew complement to add seniority to the crew in the mission of interdicting vessels at sea.

Point Banks was assigned to Division 11 of Squadron One to be based at An Thoi Naval Base on the southern tip of Phú Quốc island along with USCGC Point Clear, USCGC Point Comfort, USCGC Point Garnet, USCGC Point Glover, USCGC Point Grey, USCGC Point Marone, USCGC Point Mast and USCGC Point Young. After sea trials, the Division left Subic Bay for An Thoi on 17 July 1965 in the company of USS Floyd County, their temporary support ship. Point Banks was the only cutter to experience an engine casualty during the transit to South Vietnam. Repairs were made underway to one of the main drive engines and the division was not delayed en route. After almost two weeks at sea, they arrived at their new duty station on 1 August and began patrolling the waters in the Gulf of Thailand near the Cà Mau Peninsula. Duty consisted of boarding Vietnamese junks to search for contraband weapons and ammunition and check the identification papers of persons on board. During September 1965, USS Krishna, a repair ship outfitted for the repair of WPBs relieved USS Floyd County. Also during this time, the WPBs were directed to paint the hulls and superstructures formula 20 deck gray to cover the stateside white paint. This increased the effectiveness of night patrols.

On the night of 21 January 1969 while on patrol south of Cam Ranh Bay, Point Banks intercepted radio transmissions from the shore requesting assistance in evacuating several Army of the Republic of Vietnam (ARVN) troops that were surrounded by Viet Cong units. After receiving permission to attempt a rescue, she launched her small boat with two crewmen and came to the aid of nine stranded ARVN troops with the help of two Navy Fast Patrol Craft boats and a United States Air Force AC-47 gunship. Point Banks assisted by lobbing mortar fire along the shoreline. Gunner's Mate Second Class Willis J. Goff and Engineman Second Class Larry D. Villarreal were awarded the Silver Star medal for their heroism under fire.

On 17 November 1969, Point Banks was turned over to the Republic of Vietnam Navy as part of the Vietnamization of the war effort and recommissioned as HQ-719.

== Notes ==
=== Bibliography ===
- Larzelere, Alex (1997). The Coast Guard at War, Vietnam, 1965–1975. Naval Institute Press, Annapolis, Maryland. ISBN 978-1-55750-529-3.
- Scheina, Robert L. (1990). U.S. Coast Guard Cutters & Craft, 1946–1990. Naval Institute Press, Annapolis, Maryland. ISBN 978-0-87021-719-7.
- Scotti, Paul C. (2000). Coast Guard Action in Vietnam: Stories of Those Who Served. Hellgate Press, Central Point, Oregon. ISBN 978-1-55571-528-1.
