= USCGC Point Clear =

United States Coast Guard cutter

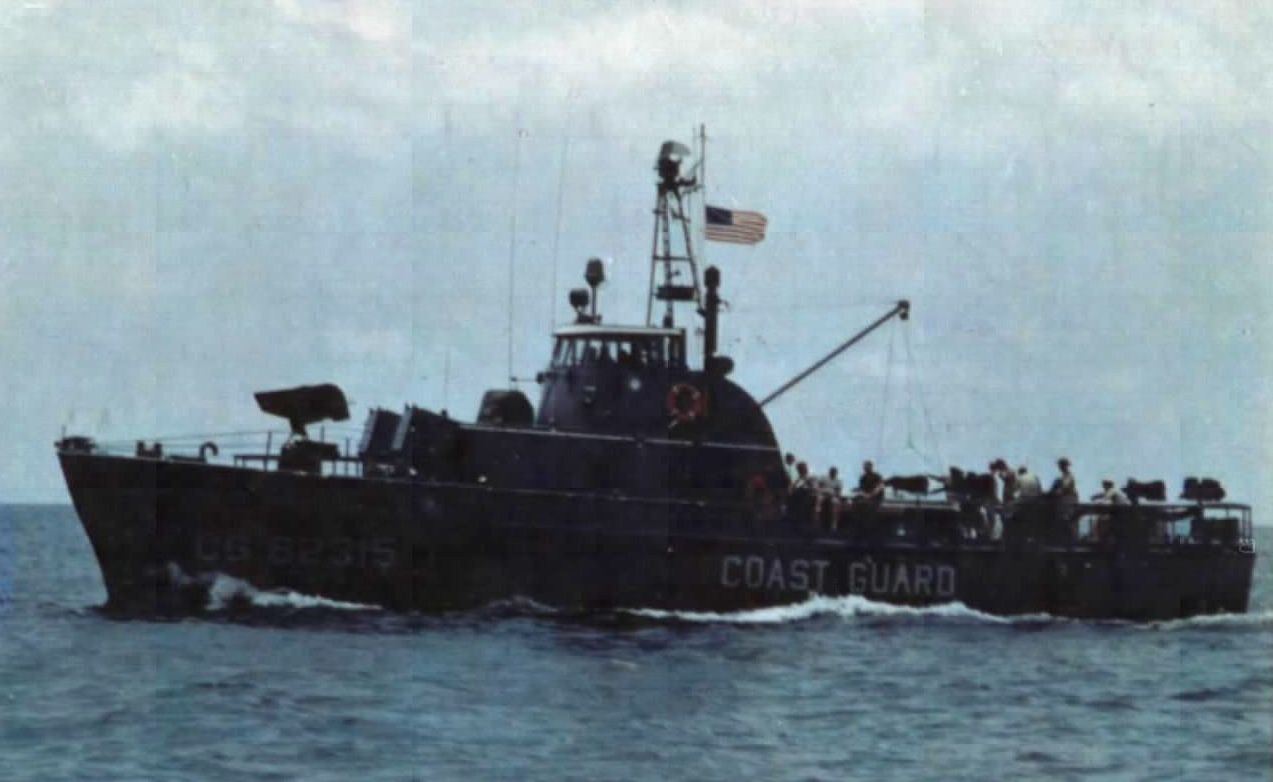
- USCGC Point Clear (WPB-82315), March 1966

History

United States
- Name: USCGC Point Clear (WPB-82315)
- Namesake: Point Clear, Alabama
- Owner: United States Coast Guard
- Builder: Coast Guard Yard, Curtis Bay, Maryland
- Commissioned: 26 April 1961
- Decommissioned: 15 September 1969
- Honors and awards: Navy Unit Commendation; Vietnam Service Medal with 2 silver service stars
- Fate: Transferred to Republic of Vietnam Navy as RVNS Huỳnh Văn Đức (HQ-702), 15 September 1969

General characteristics
- Type: Patrol Boat (WPB)
- Displacement: 60 tons
- Length: 82 ft 10 in (25.25 m)
- Beam: 17 ft 7 in (5.36 m) max
- Draft: 5 ft 11 in (1.80 m)
- Propulsion: 2 × 600 hp (447 kW) Cummins diesel engines
- Speed: 16.8 knots (31.1 km/h; 19.3 mph)
- Range: 577 nmi (1,069 km) at 14.5 kn (26.9 km/h; 16.7 mph); 1,271 nmi (2,354 km) at 10.7 kn (19.8 km/h; 12.3 mph)
- Complement: Domestic service: 8 men; Vietnam service: 2 officers, 8 men
- Armament: 1961; 1 × Oerlikon 20 mm cannon; Vietnam service; 5 × M2 Browning machine guns; 1 × 81 mm M29 mortar

USCGC Point Clear (WPB-82315) was an 82-foot (25 m) Point class cutter constructed at the Coast Guard Yard at Curtis Bay, Maryland in 1961 for use as a law enforcement and search and rescue patrol boat. Since the Coast Guard policy in 1960 was not to name cutters under 100 feet (30 m) in length, it was designated as WPB-82315 when commissioned and acquired the name Point Clear in January 1964 when the Coast Guard started naming all cutters longer than 65 feet (20 m).

== Construction and design details ==
Point Clear was built to accommodate an 8-man crew. She was powered by two 600 hp (447 kW) VT600 Cummins diesel main drive engines and had two five-bladed 42 in (1.1 m) propellers. The main drive engines were later replaced by 800 hp (597 kW) VT800 Cummins engines. Water tank capacity was 1,550 U.S. gallons (5,900 L) and fuel tank capacity was 1,840 U.S. gallons (7,000 L) at 95% full. Engine exhaust was ported through the transom rather than through a conventional stack and this permitted a 360 degree view from the bridge; a feature that was very useful in search and rescue work as well as a combat environment.

The design specifications for Point Clear included a steel hull for durability and an aluminum superstructure and longitudinally framed construction was used to save weight. Ease of operation with a small crew size was possible because of the non-manned main drive engine spaces. Controls and alarms located on the bridge allowed one man operation of the cutter thus eliminating a live engineer watch in the engine room. Because of design, four men could operate the cutter; however, the need for resting watchstanders brought the crew size to eight men for normal domestic service. The screws were designed for ease of replacement and could be changed without removing the cutter from the water. A clutch-in idle speed of three knots helped to conserve fuel on lengthy patrols and an eighteen knot maximum speed could get the cutter on scene quickly. Air-conditioned interior spaces were a part of the original design for the Point class cutter. Interior access to the deckhouse was through a watertight door on the starboard side aft of the deckhouse. The deckhouse contained the cabin for the officer-in-charge and the executive petty officer. The deckhouse also included a small arms locker, scuttlebutt, a small desk and head. Access to the lower deck and engine room was down a ladder. At the bottom of the ladder was the galley, mess and recreation deck. A watertight door at the front of the mess bulkhead led to the main crew quarters which was ten feet long and included six bunks that could be stowed, three bunks on each side. Forward of the bunks was the crew's head complete with a compact sink, shower and commode. Accommodations for a 13-man crew were installed for Vietnam service.

== History ==
After delivery in 1961, Point Clear was assigned a homeport of San Pedro, California, where she served as a law enforcement and search and rescue patrol boat.

At the request of the United States Navy, in April 1965, she was alerted for service in South Vietnam and assigned to Coast Guard Squadron One in support of Operation Market Time along with 16 other Point class cutters. While the crew completed overseas training and weapons qualifications at Coast Guard Island and Camp Parks, California, Point Clear was loaded onto a merchant ship, and transported to Subic Bay, Philippines in May 1965 where she was refitted for combat service. Shipyard modifications included installation of new single-sideband radio equipment, additional floodlights, small arms lockers, bunks, additional sound-powered phone circuits, and the addition of four M2 machine guns. The original bow mounted machine gun was replaced with a combination over-under .50 caliber machine gun/81 mm trigger fired mortar that had been developed by the Coast Guard for service in Vietnam. For service in Vietnam, two officers were added to the crew complement to add seniority to the crew in the mission of interdicting vessels at sea.

Point Clear was assigned to Division 11 of Squadron One to be based at An Thoi Naval Base on the southern tip of Phú Quốc island along with USCGC Point Banks, USCGC Point Comfort, USCGC Point Garnet, USCGC Point Glover, USCGC Point Grey, USCGC Point Marone, USCGC Point Mast and USCGC Point Young. After sea trials, the Division left Subic Bay for An Thoi on 17 July 1965 in the company of USS Floyd County, their temporary support ship. After almost two weeks at sea, they arrived at their new duty station on 1 August and began patrolling the waters in the Gulf of Thailand near the Cà Mau Peninsula. Duty consisted of boarding Vietnamese junks to search for contraband weapons and ammunition and check the identification papers of persons on board. During September 1965, USS Krishna, a repair ship outfitted for the repair of WPB's relieved the USS Floyd County. Also during this time, the WPB's were directed to paint the hulls and superstructures formula 20 deck gray to cover the stateside white paint. This increased the effectiveness of night patrols.

Point Clear was credited with helping stop the overrun of the Army of the Republic of Vietnam outpost at Hà Tiên on 20 October 1965 by firing her machine guns and lobbing mortar rounds near the perimeter of the compound. On 14 February 1966, Point Clear came to the rescue of a U.S. Navy Patrol Craft Fast (PCF) which had been sunk by a command detonated mine in shallow water near Rạch Giá. She provided covering fire with machine guns and the 81 mm mortar while Navy personnel from other PCFs evacuated the injured and recovered bodies and equipment from the wreckage.

On 15 September 1969, Point Clear was turned over to the Republic of Vietnam Navy as part of the Vietnamization of the war effort and recommissioned as RVNS Huỳnh Văn Đức (HQ-702).
