= USCGC Point Grey =

United States Coast Guard cutter

History

United States
- Name: USCGC Point Grey (WPB-82324)
- Namesake: Point Grey, Vancouver, British Columbia, Canada
- Owner: United States Coast Guard
- Builder: Coast Guard Yard, Curtis Bay, Maryland
- Commissioned: 11 October 1961
- Decommissioned: 14 July 1970
- Honors and awards: Navy Unit Commendation; Meritorious Unit Commendation (Navy); Vietnam Service Medal with 2 silver and 3 bronze service stars
- Fate: Transferred to Republic of Vietnam Navy as RVNS Huỳnh Bộ (HQ-723), 14 July 1970

General characteristics
- Type: Patrol Boat (WPB)
- Displacement: 60 tons
- Length: 82 ft 10 in (25.25 m)
- Beam: 17 ft 7 in (5.36 m) max
- Draft: 5 ft 11 in (1.80 m)
- Propulsion: 2 × 600 hp (447 kW) Cummins diesel engines
- Speed: 16.8 knots (31.1 km/h; 19.3 mph)
- Range: 577 nmi (1,069 km) at 14.5 kn (26.9 km/h; 16.7 mph); 1,271 nmi (2,354 km) at 10.7 kn (19.8 km/h; 12.3 mph)
- Complement: Domestic service: 8 men; Vietnam service: 2 officers, 8 men
- Armament: 1961; 1 × Oerlikon 20 mm cannon; Vietnam service; 5 × M2 Browning machine guns; 1 × 81 mm M29 mortar

USCGC Point Grey (WPB-82324) was an 82-foot (25 m) Point class cutter constructed at the Coast Guard Yard at Curtis Bay, Maryland in 1961 for use as a law enforcement and search and rescue patrol boat. Since the Coast Guard policy in 1961 was not to name cutters under 100 feet (30 m) in length, it was designated as WPB-82324 when commissioned and acquired the name Point Grey in January 1964 when the Coast Guard started naming all cutters longer than 65 feet (20 m).

== Construction and design details ==
Point Grey was built to accommodate an 8-man crew. She was powered by two 600 hp (447 kW) VT600 Cummins diesel main drive engines and had two five-bladed 42 in (1.1 m) propellers. The main drive engines were later replaced by 800 hp (597 kW) VT800 Cummins engines. Water tank capacity was 1,550 U.S. gallons (5,900 L) and fuel tank capacity was 1,840 U.S. gallons (7,000 L) at 95% full. Engine exhaust was ported through the transom rather than through a conventional stack and this permitted a 360 degree view from the bridge; a feature that was very useful in search and rescue work as well as a combat environment.

The design specifications for Point Grey included a steel hull for durability and an aluminum superstructure and longitudinally framed construction was used to save weight. Ease of operation with a small crew size was possible because of the non-manned main drive engine spaces. Controls and alarms located on the bridge allowed one man operation of the cutter thus eliminating a live engineer watch in the engine room. Because of design, four men could operate the cutter; however, the need for resting watchstanders brought the crew size to eight men for normal domestic service. The screws were designed for ease of replacement and could be changed without removing the cutter from the water. A clutch-in idle speed of three knots helped to conserve fuel on lengthy patrols and an eighteen knot maximum speed could get the cutter on scene quickly. Air-conditioned interior spaces were a part of the original design for the Point class cutter. Interior access to the deckhouse was through a watertight door on the starboard side aft of the deckhouse. The deckhouse contained the cabin for the officer-in-charge and the executive petty officer. The deckhouse also included a small arms locker, scuttlebutt, a small desk and head. Access to the lower deck and engine room was down a ladder. At the bottom of the ladder was the galley, mess and recreation deck. A watertight door at the front of the mess bulkhead led to the main crew quarters which was ten feet long and included six bunks that could be stowed, three bunks on each side. Forward of the bunks was the crew's head complete with a compact sink, shower and commode. Accommodations for a 13-man crew were installed for Vietnam service.

== History ==
After delivery in 1961, Point Grey was assigned a homeport of Norfolk, Virginia, where she served as a law enforcement and search and rescue patrol boat.

At the request of the United States Navy, in April 1965, she was alerted for service in South Vietnam and assigned to Coast Guard Squadron One in support of Operation Market Time along with 16 other Point class cutters. While the crew completed overseas training and weapons qualifications at Coast Guard Island and Camp Parks, California, Point Grey was loaded onto a merchant ship, and transported to Subic Bay, Philippines in May 1965 where she was refitted for combat service. Shipyard modifications included installation of new single-sideband radio equipment, additional floodlights, small arms lockers, bunks, additional sound-powered phone circuits, and the addition of four M2 machine guns. The original bow-mounted machine gun was replaced with a combination over-under .50 caliber machine gun/81 mm trigger-fired mortar that had been developed by the Coast Guard for service in Vietnam. For service in Vietnam, two officers were added to the crew complement to add seniority to the crew in the mission of interdicting vessels at sea.

Point Grey was assigned to Division 11 of Squadron One to be based at An Thoi Naval Base, on the southern tip of Phú Quốc Island along with USCGC Point Banks, USCGC Point Clear, USCGC Point Comfort, USCGC Point Garnet, USCGC Point Glover, USCGC Point Marone, USCGC Point Mast and USCGC Point Young. After sea trials, the Division left Subic Bay for An Thoi on 17 July 1965 in the company of USS Floyd County, their temporary support ship. After almost two weeks at sea, they arrived at their new duty station on 1 August and began patrolling the waters in the Gulf of Thailand near the Cà Mau Peninsula. Duty consisted of boarding Vietnamese junks to search for contraband weapons and ammunition and check the identification papers of persons on board. During September 1965, USS Krishna, a repair ship outfitted for the repair of WPB's relieved the Floyd County. Also during this time, the WPB's were directed to paint the hulls and superstructures formula 20 deck gray to cover the stateside white paint. This increased the effectiveness of night patrols.

On 26 September 1965, Point Grey and Point Comfort embarked a raiding party of 36 Civilian Irregular Defense Group (CIDG) mercenaries, their Vietnamese officers and 2 U.S. Army Special Forces advisors that were tasked with a night raid of Hon Mot Island. Point Grey, assisted by Point Marone provided covering fire and medical evacuation for the wounded.

On 9 May 1966 while on patrol, Point Grey interdicted a 120-foot steel hull trawler that beached itself under covering fire from Viet Cong (VC) hiding in the tree line. With the assistance of USS Brister and USS Vireo the VC were prevented from boarding the trawler to retrieve the arms and supplies it carried. Point Grey was hit with machine gun fire from the shore; part of the crew were injured and substantial damage was done to the bridge of the cutter. Authorization was received to destroy the trawler and with assistance from USCGC Point Cypress the two cutters mortared the trawler setting it on fire. Later the whole area was shaken with a tremendous explosion as the trawler's ammunition supplies exploded. This incident marked the first time a Market Time unit had interdicted a suspicious trawler.

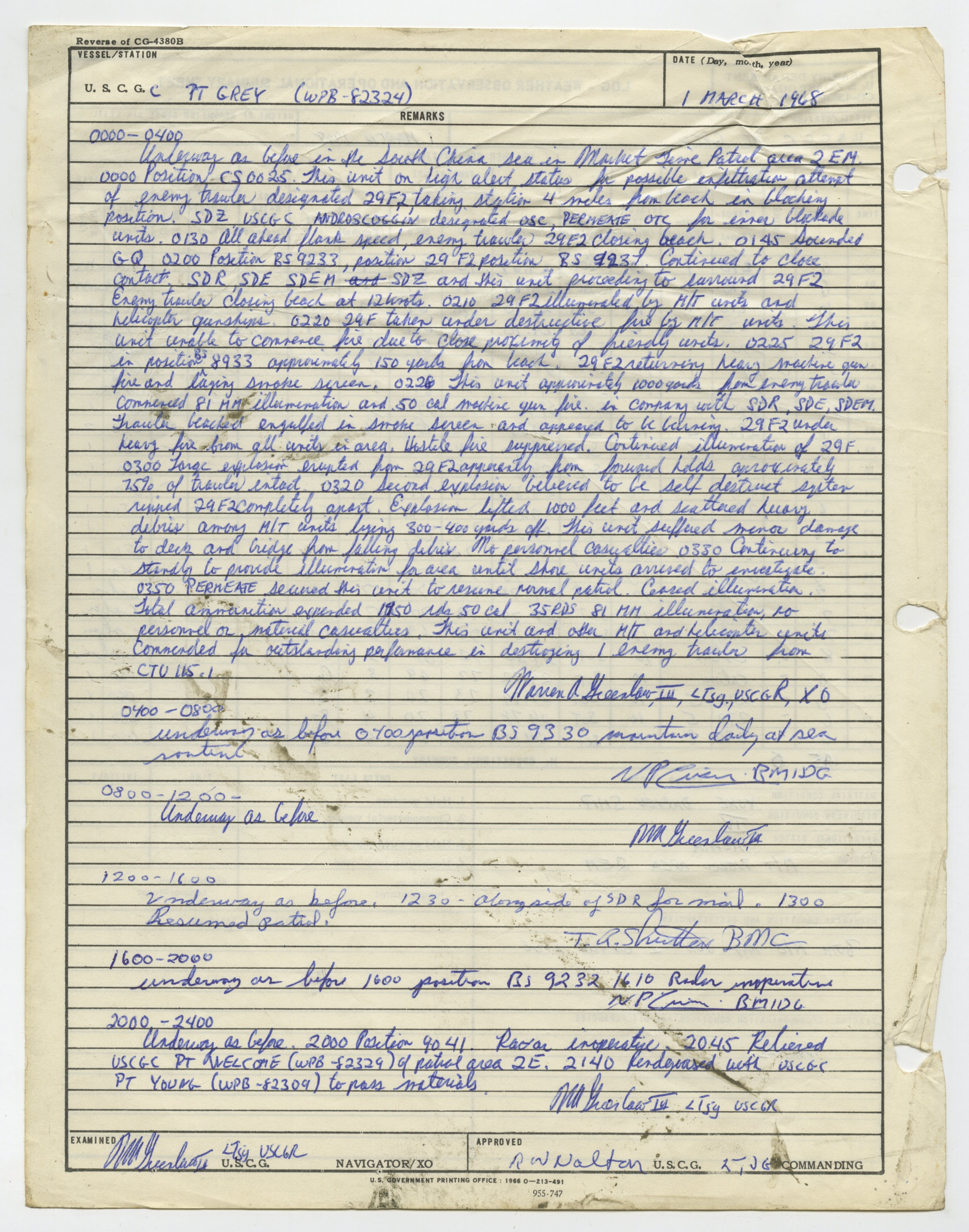
Logbook page of the Point Grey for 1 March 1968

A steel-hulled trawler was interdicted and destroyed on 1 March 1968 attempting to smuggle supplies and ammunition ashore near Cu Lao Re Island. The trawler was destroyed by mortar fire from Point Grey assisted by Point Welcome, USCGC Androscoggin and two U.S. Navy Patrol Craft Fast, PCF-18 and PCF-20.

On 14 July 1970, Point Grey was turned over to the Republic of Vietnam Navy as part of the Vietnamization of the war effort and recommissioned as RVNS Huỳnh Bộ (HQ-723).

== Notes ==
=== Bibliography ===
- "War in Vietnam". Soviet-Empire website. Soviet-Empire.com. Archived from the original on 24 December 2017.
- Cutler, Thomas J. (2000). Brown Water, Black Berets: Coastal and Riverine Warfare in Vietnam. Naval Institute Press, Annapolis. ISBN 978-1-55750-196-7.
- Kelley, Michael P. (2002). Where We Were in Vietnam. Hellgate Press, Central Point, OR. ISBN 978-1-55571-625-7.
- Larzelere, Alex (1997). The Coast Guard at War, Vietnam, 1965-1975. Naval Institute Press, Annapolis. ISBN 978-1-55750-529-3.
- Scheina, Robert L. (1990). U.S. Coast Guard Cutters & Craft, 1946-1990. Naval Institute Press, Annapolis. ISBN 978-0-87021-719-7.
- Scotti, Paul C. (2000). Coast Guard Action in Vietnam: Stories of Those Who Served. Hellgate Press, Central Point, OR. ISBN 978-1-55571-528-1.
- Wells II, William R. (August 1997). "The United States Coast Guard's Piggyback 81mm Mortar/.50 cal. machine gun". Vietnam Magazine.
- Tulich, Eugene N. (1975). "The United States Coast Guard in South East Asia During the Vietnam Conflict". U.S. Coast Guard History Office.
