= USS Brister =

Edsall-class destroyer escort

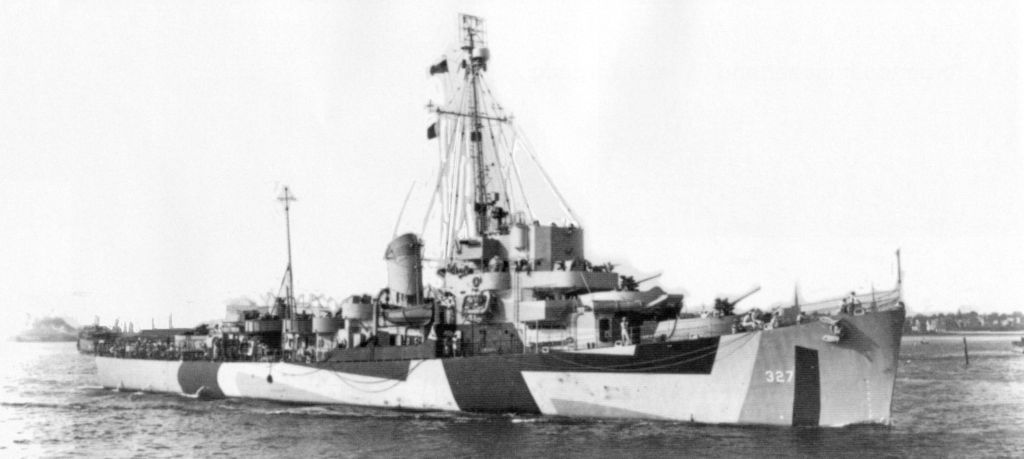
- USS Brister (DE-327), undated wartime image, showing ship in camouflage paint

History

United States
- Name: USS Brister
- Namesake: Robert Earl Brister (missing in action)
- Ordered: 1942
- Builder: Consolidated Steel Corporation, Orange, Texas
- Laid down: 14 June 1943
- Launched: 24 August 1943
- Sponsored by: Mrs. Blanche Brister, mother of ensign Brister
- Commissioned: 30 November 1943
- Reclassified: 21 July 1956 as DER-327
- Stricken: 23 September 1968
- Fate: Sold for scrapping to Chi Shun Hua Steel Co., Kaohsiung, Taiwan 3 November 1971

General characteristics
- Type: Edsall-class destroyer escort
- Displacement: 1,590 tons full, 1,200 tons standard
- Length: 306 ft (93 m) overall
- Beam: 36 ft 7 in (11.15 m)
- Draught: 12 ft 3 in (3.73 m) ax
- Propulsion: 4 FM diesel engines, 4 diesel-generators, 6,000 shp (4.5 MW), 2 screws
- Speed: 21 knots (39 km/h)
- Range: 9,100 nmi. at 12 knots; (17,000 km at 22 km/h)
- Complement: 8 officers, 201 enlisted
- Armament: 3 × 3 in (76 mm) guns (3×1); 2 × 40 mm guns (1×2); 8 × 20 mm cannon (8×1); 3 × 21 inch (533 mm) torpedo tubes; 1 × hedgehog projector; 8 × K-gun depth charge projectors; 2 × depth charge tracks

USS Brister (DE/DER-327) was an Edsall-class destroyer escort of the United States Navy.

== Namesake ==
Robert E. Brister was born on 4 May 1920 in Galveston, Texas. He enlisted in the United States Naval Reserve in 1941 and was commissioned an ensign in 1942. He was officially reported missing in action 2 May 1942 when USS Cythera, on which he was serving, was torpedoed and sunk by German submarine U-402 off the coast of North Carolina.

== Built in Orange, Texas ==
Brister was laid down on 14 June 1943 at Consolidated Steel Corporation, Ltd., of Orange, Texas; launched on 24 August 1943, sponsored by Mrs. Blanche Brister, mother of Ensign Brister; and commissioned on 30 November 1943.

== World War II operations ==
Between June 1944 and June 1945, Brister made two successful trans-Atlantic escort crossings to Italy and five to the United Kingdom. On 8 June 1945 she departed New York City for the Pacific, arriving at San Diego on 3 July 1945.

Brister departed Pearl Harbor in August 1945 and proceeded to the Far East, arriving there in September. She carried out patrol and escort duties in the East China Sea, supporting the occupation of Japan and Korea, until April 1946. She departed Singapore on 8 April 1946 and returned to Charleston, South Carolina, via the Suez Canal and the Mediterranean, arriving there on 30 May. Brister then reported for inactivation and went out of commission in reserve at Green Cove Springs, Florida, on 4 October 1946.

== Conversion to radar picket ship ==
On 1 September 1955 Brister commenced conversion to a radar picket escort vessel at Charleston Naval Shipyard. She was recommissioned on 21 July 1956 as DER-327 and reported to the Atlantic Fleet for duty.

While assigned to Operation Market Time near the coastal waters of South Vietnam, she assisted USCGC Point Grey (WPB-82324) and USCGC Point Cypress (WPB-82326) in destroying a North Vietnamese trawler attempting to smuggle arms and ammunition into the country.

== Struck from Navy records ==
Brister was stricken 23 September 1968.

3 November 1971: Sold for scrapping to Chi Shun Hua Steel Co., Kaohsiung, Taiwan

== References used ==
- This article incorporates text from the public domain Dictionary of American Naval Fighting Ships. The entry can be found here.
- Larzelere, Alex (1997). The Coast Guard at War, Vietnam, 1965–1975. Naval Institute Press, Annapolis, Maryland. ISBN 978-1-55750-529-3.
