= Cà Mau Peninsula =

Peninsula in Vietnam

Coordinates: 9°05′10″N 105°05′00″E

Cà Mau Peninsula

The Cà Mau Peninsula (Vietnamese: Bán Đảo Cà Mau) makes up the southern tip of Vietnam. It is in Cà Mau province, and lies between the Gulf of Thailand to the west and the South China Sea to the east.

Cà Mau is a triangular stretch of land, with a maximum length of 130 miles and average height of seven feet above the sea level. Its formation is almost totally the result of the deposits of the Mekong River, which is also behind the Cape Bai formation at the tail end of the peninsula.

Cà Mau's climate can be said to be tropical monsoonal year round except for the two to three months in winter when it sees a relatively dry climate.

== Economy ==
Roads came to the Cà Mau after the Second World War. The peninsula's geographic features change dramatically as it tapers southward, the plains giving way to dense, tropical mangrove swamps. The serpentine waterways of the swamps have been a rich source of fish for the locals. The economy of the region is based on cultivated as well as natural products. Rice, honey, wax, fibre mats and fish are some of the things the locals of the region trade and export. The Cà Mau Peninsula was also once a citadel of the Viet Minh and Viet Cong guerrillas.

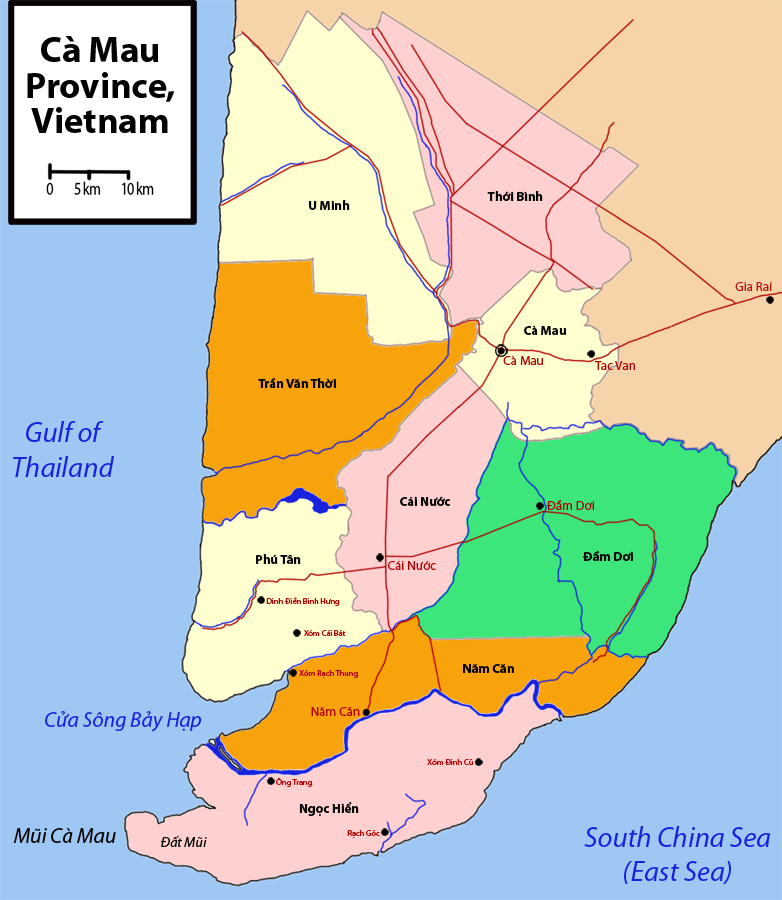
Map of the Cà Mau province before 2025

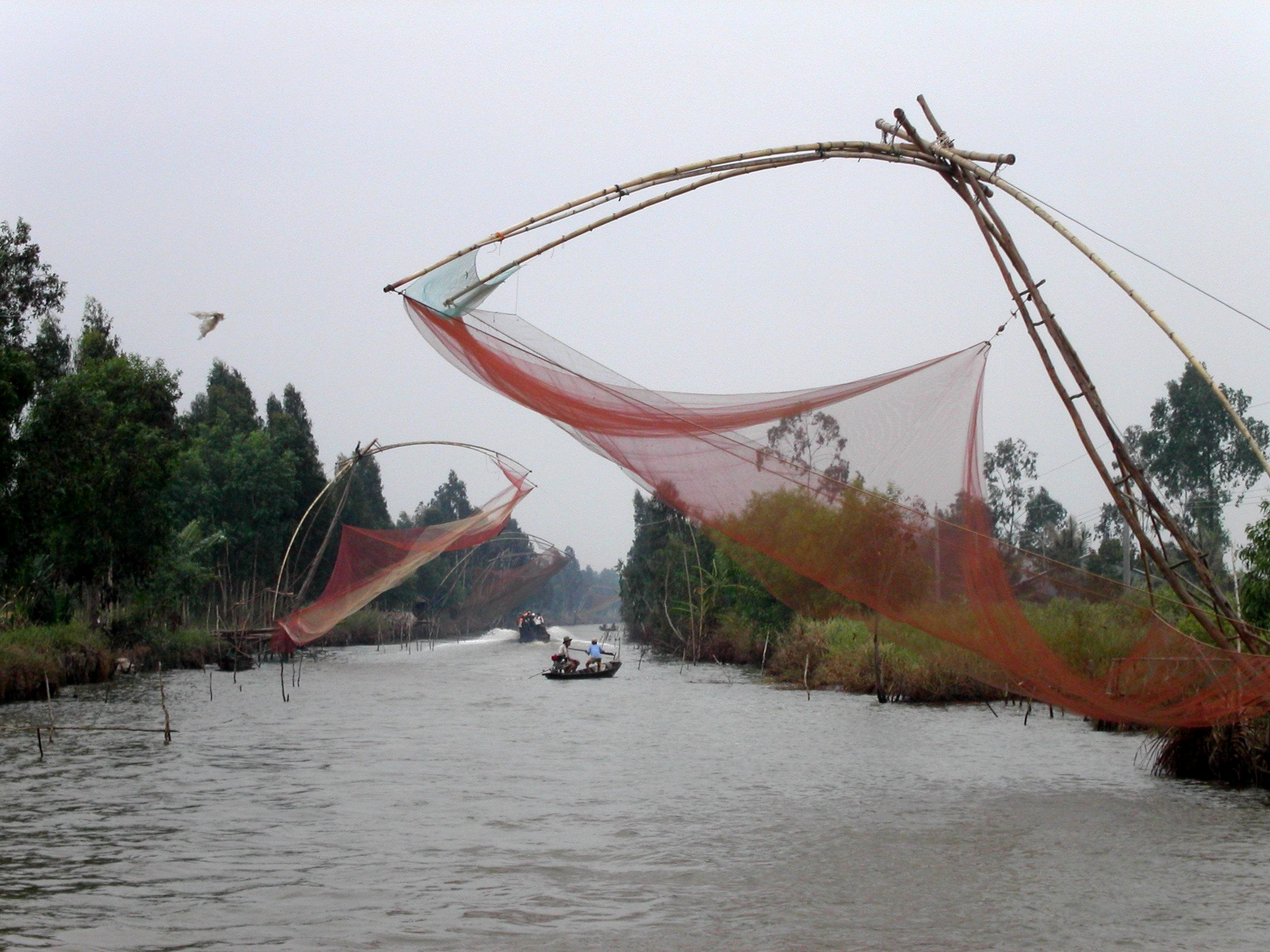
Fishing nets rigged in the waterways of the Cà Mau Peninsula
