= USS Krishna =

Achelous-class landing craft

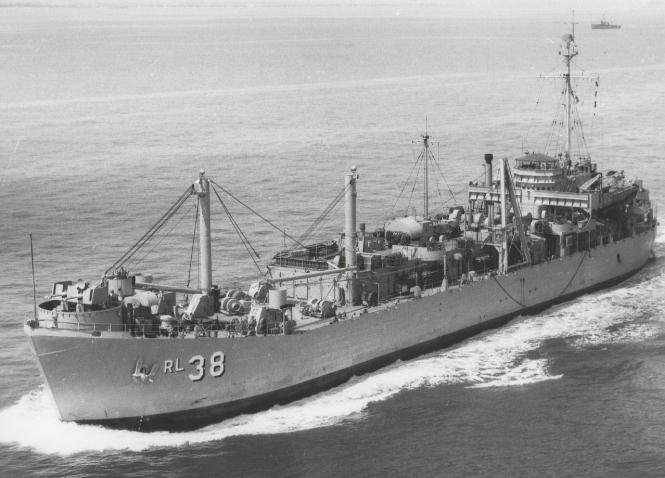

History

United States
- Name: Krishna
- Builder: Chicago Bridge & Iron Company
- Laid down: 23 February 1945
- Launched: 25 May 1945
- Commissioned: 3 December 1945
- Decommissioned: 30 October 1971
- Stricken: 30 October 1971
- Fate: Sold to the Republic of the Philippines, 30 October 1971

Philippines
- Name: Narra
- Acquired: 30 October 1971
- Identification: AR-88

General characteristics
- Class & type: Achelous-class repair ship
- Displacement: 1,781 long tons (1,810 t) light; 3,700 long tons (3,759 t) full
- Length: 328 ft (100 m)
- Beam: 50 ft (15 m)
- Draft: 11 ft 2 in (3.40 m)
- Propulsion: 2 × General Motors 12-567 diesel engines, two shafts, twin rudders
- Speed: 12 knots (14 mph; 22 km/h)
- Complement: 260
- Armament: 2 × 40 mm guns; 8 × 20 mm guns

Service record
- Operations: Vietnam War
- Awards: 12 battle stars

USS Krishna (ARL-38) was one of 39 Achelous-class landing craft repair ships built for the United States Navy during World War II. Named for Krishna (a deity worshiped across many traditions of Hinduism), she was the only U.S. Naval vessel to bear the name, and only one of three ships (along with USS Indra and the Civil War era gunboat USS Varuna) to be named after a Hindu deity.

Originally classified LST-1149, Krishna was reclassified ARL-38 on 14 August 1944; laid down 23 February 1945 by Chicago Bridge & Iron Company of Seneca, Illinois; launched 25 May 1945; sponsored by Mrs. Eva Best Smith; placed in reduced commission during transfer to Mobile, Alabama for conversion; and commissioned 3 December 1945 at Mobile.

== Service history ==
Departing Mobile 8 January 1946 Krishna arrived Norfolk 14 January for duty with Amphibious Group 2 at Little Creek, Virginia. For more than 19 years the landing craft repair ship operated out of Little Creek, during which time support-and-repair operations carried her from Baffin Bay to the Caribbean. From 25 May to 31 August 1951 while under the command of CDR Harold C. "Brownie" Brown she participated in "Operation Blue Jay" during the initial phase of establishing the large air base at Thule, Greenland. While at Little Creek she made annual deployments to Puerto Rico, the Virgin Islands, and other Caribbean islands supporting amphibious landing exercises.

Krishna departed Little Creek 5 October 1964 and sailed to waters off southern Spain, arriving at Huelva 26 October. While there she participated in "Operation Steel Pike" (the largest amphibious landing operation since World War II, which sent more than 28,000 2nd Division Marines storming the shores on a mock invasion). One of 84 naval ships, Krishna provided support and replenishment services during this impressive exercise that clearly illustrated the strength and diversity of American naval sea power and emphasized the Navy's ability and readiness to move a vast amphibious force to any shore if needed in keeping the peace. Departing Huelva 4 November, Krishna steamed to the East Coast via Porto, Portugal, and arrived Little Creek 29 November.

=== Vietnam War ===
From 1 December to 22 February 1965 Krishna reactivated USS Kirwin, and on 1 June she was assigned to Service Force, Pacific Fleet. Departing Little Creek, she steamed via Pearl Harbor and Guam for duty in the Far East. Operating out of Subic Bay, Philippines, she reached the Gulf of Thailand off the coast of South Vietnam 17 September and began duty as support ship for patrol craft of U.S. Coast Guard Squadron One, Division 11 based at An Thoi Naval Base on Phu Quoc Island. While the cutters patrolled coastal waters to prevent infiltration of ammunition and supplies to the Viet Cong, Krishna served as a repair facility and fueling station as well as an operations, communications, and command center. Later in 1965 she also provided services for eight Patrol Craft Fast (PCF) boats that arrived to strengthen the coastal surveillance program.

Krishna remained on station until 1 December when she departed for Bangkok, Thailand, arriving 3 December. She returned to her various support duties in the Gulf of Thailand 11 December. In February 1966 Krishna raised and salvaged PCF-4, and continued her duty in 1966 servicing, maintenance and repairing of Patrol Craft Fast (PCF) boats and cutters. On 30 April 1967, men from Krishna helped extinguish a fire in An Thoi. She had a number of distinguished visitors through 1967, including Secretary of the Navy Paul H. Nitze on 15 July. On 21 July the landing craft repair ship headed for Sasebo, Japan with a stopover at Kaoshiung, Taiwan on 29 July to provide repair facilities, arriving Sasebo 9 August 1967. Krishna departed Sasebo for Vietnam 22 September, arriving in the Gulf of Thailand 7 October to resume her WestPac mission, still based at An Thoi Naval Base. Krishna continued to patrol off the coast of Vietnam, servicing and repairing patrol boats on duty in the Mekong Delta through 1967 until 30 June 1971.

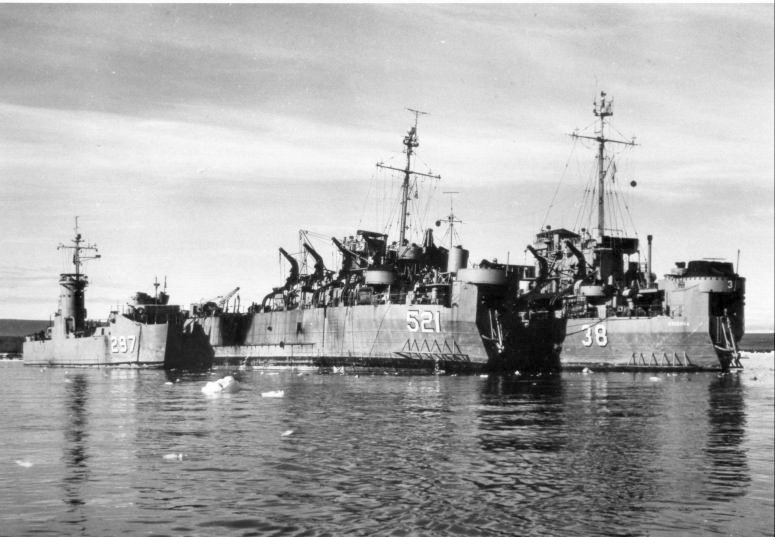
USS Krishna, USS LSM-297 and USS LST-521 in Greenland during "Operation Blue Jay," July 1951

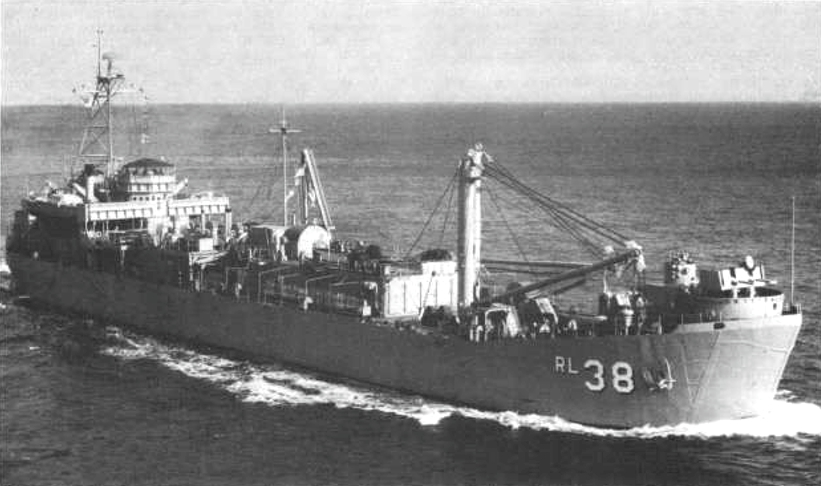
USS Krishna at sea

During the Vietnam War Krishna participated in the following campaigns:

- Vietnamese Defense (16 September to 3 December 1965 and 11 to 24 December 1965)
- Vietnamese Counteroffensive – Phase I (25 December 1965 to 30 June 1966)
- Vietnamese Counteroffensive – Phase II (1 to 22 July 1966, 6 October 1966, and 1 to 14 April 1967)
- Vietnamese Counteroffensive – Phase III (1 November 1967 to 29 January 1968)
- Tet Counteroffensive (30 January to 1 April 1968)
- Vietnamese Counteroffensive – Phase IV (2 to 16 April 1968)
- Vietnamese Counteroffensive – Phase V (21 September to 1 November 1968)
- Vietnamese Counteroffensive – Phase VI (2 to 10 November 1968)
- Vietnam Summer-Fall 1969 (30 June to 31 October 1969)
- Vietnam Winter-Spring 1970 (1 to 10 November 1969 and 4 January 1970)
- Vietnamese Counteroffensive – Phase VII (31 December 1970 to 20 March 1971 and 30 May to 30 June 1971)
- Consolidation I (1 July to 9 October 1971)

Krishna earned twelve battle stars for service during the Vietnam War.

== Fate ==
Decommissioned on 30 October 1971 at Subic Bay, Krishna was struck from the Naval Vessel Register the same day. Sold to the Republic of the Philippines 30 October 1971 and renamed RPS Narra (AR-88), she was decommissioned in 1992.

== Awards ==
- World War II Victory Medal
- National Defense Service Medal with star
- Vietnam Service Medal with 12 campaign stars
- Republic of Vietnam Campaign Medal
