= Vietnamization =

U.S. foreign policy during the Vietnam War

- Part of Vietnam War
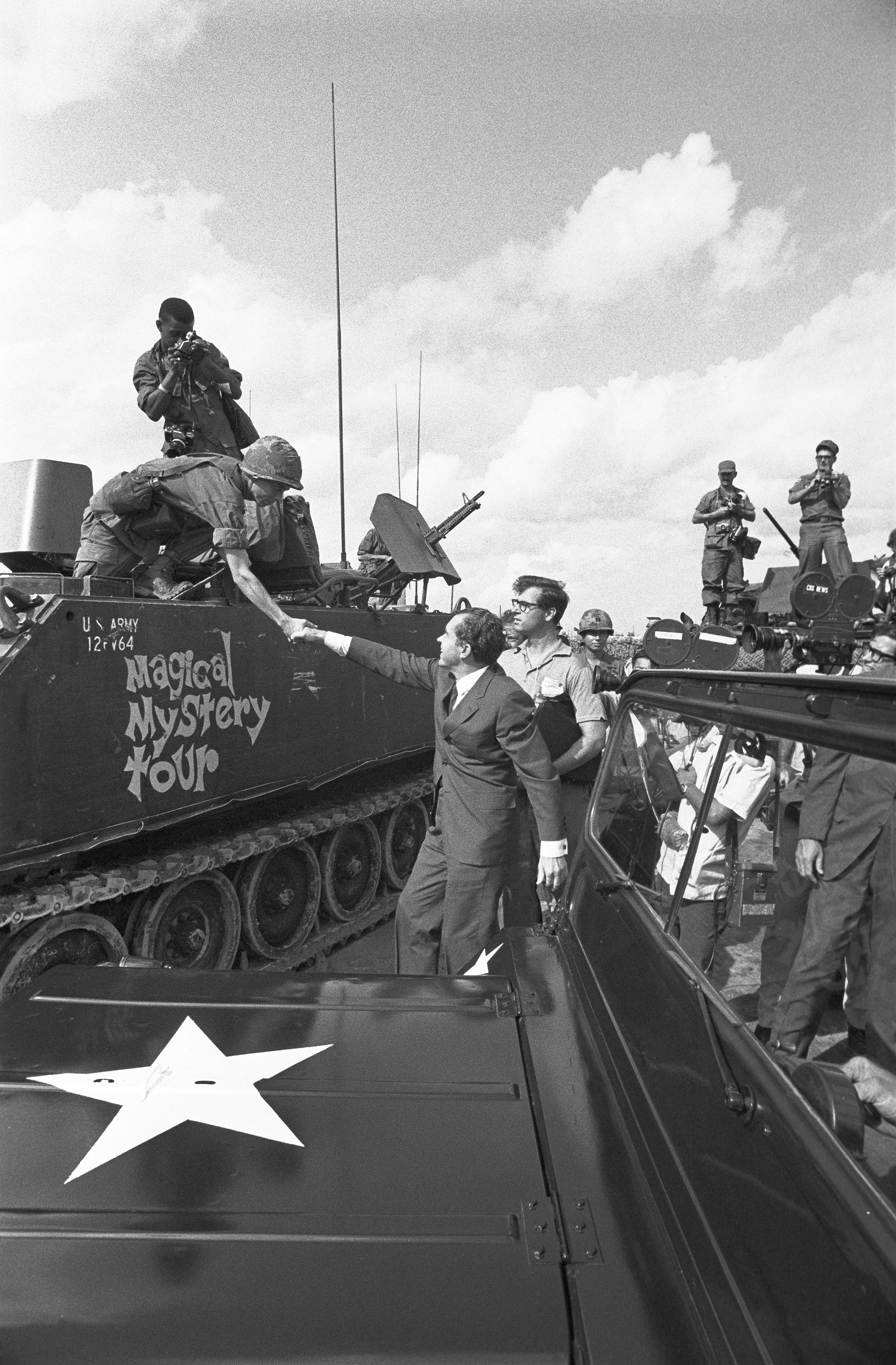
- President Richard Nixon shaking hands with armed forces in South Vietnam, July 30, 1969
Date	28 January 1969–29 March 1973 (4 years, 2 months and 1 day)
Location	South Vietnam
Result	1973 U.S. withdrawal from Vietnam

Vietnamization was a policy enacted in early 1969 by the Richard Nixon administration aimed at ending U.S. involvement in the Vietnam War by expanding, equipping, and training the South Vietnamese armed forces (ARVN) and increasing their combat role, while at the same reducing involvement of U.S. combat troops. The policy of Vietnamization, despite its successful execution, was ultimately a failure as the improved ARVN forces were unable to stop North Vietnam and its People's Army of Vietnam (PAVN). The South Vietnamese government collapsed with the fall of Saigon in April 1975 and north and south Vietnam were subsequently unified under communism as the Socialist Republic of Vietnam.

The policy of Vietnamization was brought on by North Vietnam's Tet Offensive in early 1968 which had led to increasing opposition among the American public to continued involvement in the war. This continued to increase following other events such as the 1968 My Lai massacre, the 1970 invasion of Cambodia, and the 1971 leaking of the Pentagon Papers. The term "Vietnamization" originated from a meeting on January 28, 1969, of the National Security Council. General Andrew Goodpaster, commander of the Military Assistance Command, Vietnam, stated that the ARVN had been improving to the point that the war could be "de-Americanized". Secretary of Defense Melvin Laird agreed but suggested using the term "Vietnamizing" instead.

Vietnamization also fit into the broader détente policy of the Nixon administration, in which the United States moved away from a strategy of containment of communism to a more cooperative strategy with other world powers, including the Soviet Union and China. Nixon ordered negotiations with the Soviets and opened high-level contact with China. Improving relations with these countries was of higher priority than South Vietnam.

Vietnamization had two components. The first was "strengthening the armed force of the South Vietnamese in numbers, equipment, leadership and combat skills", while the second was "the extension of the pacification program [i.e. military aid to civilians] in South Vietnam". U.S. helicopters would continue to fly in support while South Vietnamese candidates were trained to eventually take over operations. The policy reduced the involvement of U.S. combat troops specifically in the ground combat roles, but did not initially reduce operations by the U.S. Air Force, as well as the support to South Vietnam, consistent with the policies of U.S. foreign military assistance organizations.

== Precedent: French jaunissement in Indochina War ==
From 1950, after several years of the First Indochina War, French commanders adopted a policy they called "yellowing" (jaunissement), expressly to minimize White casualties. This change, at the time, was mostly due to a deficit of troops in the FTEO, the Far-East segment of the French army. Vietnamese soldiers were progressively integrated in battalions. As part of decolonization process, after recognizing Vietnamese independence within the French Union in 1949, France allowed Vietnam to establish its own army (Vietnamese National Army) on 8 December 1950, this army then worked side by side with the French army (French Union Army) to fight against the communist Viet Minh rebels. U.S. critics of the war compared Vietnamization to jaunissement. This Vietnamese army would become the ARVN.

== Preparation under Johnson ==
Excerpt of Lyndon B. Johnson speech on the Vietnam War (September 29, 1967)

Lyndon Johnson's major political interests were domestic; the war interfered with his domestic focus, and he was eager to end the war in a way that he considered politically acceptable. In 1967, Kissinger attended a Pugwash Conference of scientists interested in nuclear disarmament. This was the first contact between Ho Chi Minh and Kissinger, who was then an adviser to Nelson Rockefeller, the governor of New York and a presidential candidate. Two participants approached Kissinger and offered a disavowable means of communication between the U.S. and the communist leadership. In particular, Raymond Aubrac, an official of the World Health Organization, knew Ho Chi Minh and agreed to carry a message.

After discussing the matter with Assistant Secretary of State William Bundy and Secretary of Defense Robert McNamara, a message was sent. Ho said he would be willing to negotiate if the U.S. bombing of North Vietnam under Operation Rolling Thunder ceased. Mai Van Bo, Hanoi's diplomatic representative in Paris, was named a point of contact. Since Hanoi would not communicate with an American official without a bombing halt, Kissinger served as an intermediary. Johnson made a speech in San Antonio on September 29, offering the possibility of talks. They were rejected, although brought up again in 1967.

=== End of Americanization ===
The departure of Lyndon B. Johnson did not end the war; rather, it spread throughout Southeast Asia. The Tet Offensive (1968) was a political and media disaster. Newsman Walter Cronkite announced that he saw a stalemate as the best case scenario for the Tet Offensive. Other members of the press added to the call to retrench (reduce costs and spending). President Johnson's popularity plummeted and he announced a bombing halt on March 31, simultaneously announcing he would not run for re-election. Though he had low expectations, on May 10, 1968, Johnson began peace talks between U.S. and North Vietnamese in Paris. The war, however, continued.

== Nixon Administration analysis of options ==
Under the Nixon administration, Henry Kissinger, Nixon's chief adviser, asked the Rand Corporation to provide a list of policy options, prepared by Daniel Ellsberg. On receiving the report, Kissinger and Schelling asked Ellsberg about the apparent absence of a victory option; Ellsberg said "I don't believe there is a win option in Vietnam." While Ellsberg eventually did send a withdrawal option, Kissinger would not circulate something that could be perceived as defeat, though privately, he realized the United States was in a difficult position and priorities needed to be set.

According to a record, prepared by Soviet Ambassador to the United States Anatoliy Dobrynin, of discussions between Dobrynin and Kissinger, the crux of the U.S. position, was progress still must be made at the Paris talks and, for domestic political reasons, Nixon "simply cannot wait a year for Hanoi to decide to take some new step and take a more flexible position". Dobrynin expressed the Soviet position that the U.S. needed to stop trying to divide the Paris Peace Talks into two parts:

- discussion of military issues between the U.S. and the DRV
- resolution of political issues by placing them, "for all practical purposes, entirely in the hands of Saigon, which does not want to resolve them and is unable to do so, since it is unable to soberly assess the situation and the alignment of forces in South Vietnam".

Dobrynin, however, misunderstood the extent to which the U.S. was willing to apply military force not involving ground troops, culminating in Operation Linebacker II.

=== Domestic aspect ===
The process of Vietnamization was partly influenced by Nixon’s delicate political position on a domestic level. He had been elected with 43.4% of the votes, and Laird was concerned with his support at home. Indeed, he could sense the impatience of the American public regarding the war. Nixon himself believed American casualties reduced the support for the war. For members of his administration, a campaign of attrition was useless against an Asian power, because they were able to tolerate a greater number of casualties compared to a Western power.

On the left, Senator Fulbright, chairman of the Foreign Relations committee, feared Vietnamization would not be enough to reduce the numbers of casualties:

My fear is that the current policy will keep the US bogged down in Vietnam – with the killing and cost continuing indefinitely.

== Nixon policy direction ==
Nixon directed the Joint Chiefs of Staff to prepare a six-step withdrawal plan. The Commandant of the Marine Corps General Leonard F. Chapman Jr. remembered, "I felt, and I think that most Marines felt, that the time had come to get out of Vietnam." Leading the ground force withdrawals, Marine redeployments started in mid-1969, and by the end of the year the entire 3rd Marine Division had departed.

In the aftermath of the Tet Offensive, ARVN units were able to take control of areas held by the Viet Cong. General Tran Van Tra of the Viet Cong forces in the South stated:

We suffered large sacrifices and losses with regard to manpower and materiel, especially cadres at the various echelons, which clearly weakened us. Afterwards, we were not only unable to retain the gains we had made but had to overcome a myriad of difficulties in 1969 and 1970.

Some ARVN units, especially that had been operating closely with U.S. troops or using facilities, could quickly move into a dominant role in their areas.

Other ARVN units faced more of a challenge. For example, the ARVN 5th Division was directed to move from its existing base camp, Phu Cuong, to that of the U.S. 1st Infantry Division in Lai Khê, while the U.S. division moved southeast to Dĩ An. The ARVN unit had to retain its previous operational responsibility, while replacing a division that was far better equipped with helicopters than a standard U.S. division. At Phu Cong, Major General Nguyen Van Hieu, the 5th Division commander, was able to use a local Popular Force battalion for base security. The Popular Force battalions, however, did not move away from the area in which they were formed.

== Joint operations against Cambodia ==
In 1969, Nixon ordered B-52 strikes against the People's Army of Vietnam (PAVN) bases and supply routes in Cambodia, which had been used as a sanctuary by North Vietnam forces. The orders for U.S. bombing of Cambodia were classified, and thus kept from the U.S. media and Congress. In a given strike, each B-52 normally dropped 42,000 lb (19,000 kg) of bombs, and each strike consisted of three or six bombers.

=== Cambodian change of government ===
Much of North Vietnamese infiltration went through Cambodia. Nixon authorized unacknowledged bombing in Cambodia while U.S. ground troops were in South Vietnam. General Lon Nol had overthrown Prince Norodom Sihanouk in March 1970, who had presented himself as a neutralist while aware of the PAVN use of his country.

In June 1969, the Viet Cong and its allied organizations formed the Provisional Revolutionary Government of the Republic of South Vietnam (PRG), recognized by Hanoi as the legal government of South Vietnam. At that time, communist losses dating from the Tet Offensive numbered 75,000, and morale was faltering, even among the party leadership.

=== Joint ground operations ===
On April 30, 1970, responding to a Communist attempt to take Cambodia, Nixon announced a large scale U.S.–ARVN incursion into Cambodia to directly hit the PAVN headquarters and supply dumps; the area bordered ARVN III Corps tactical zone.

The campaign began on May 1. The U.S. Task Force Shoemaker, of the 1st Cavalry Divisions, carried out B-52 strikes in the Fishhook area of Cambodia. T.F. Shoemaker operated with the ARVN Airborne Brigade. Separate ARVN operations took place in the Parrot's Beak area. III Corps tactical zone commander Do Cao Tri, the most visible ARVN leader, encouraged the deepest ARVN penetrations.

The incursion prevented the immediate takeover of Cambodia by Pol Pot and his Khmer Rouge, and cost the PAVN the supply line from the port of Sihanoukville. The Khmer Rouge broke with its North Vietnamese sponsors, and aligned with China. This made American involvement visible to the U.S. population, and there were intense protests, including deaths in a confrontation between rock-throwing protesters and National Guardsmen at Kent State University.

== Intelligence and security ==
The U.S. intelligence collection systems, a significant amount of which (especially the techniques) were not shared with the ARVN, and, while not fully declassified, examples have been mentioned earlier in this article. The Communist side's intelligence operations, beyond the spies that were discovered, are much less known.

While there had been many assumptions that the South Vietnamese government was penetrated by many spies, and there indeed were many, a December 1969 capture of a Viet Cong communications intelligence center and documents revealed that they had been getting a huge amount of information using simple technology and smart people, as well as sloppy U.S. communications security. This specific discovery was made by U.S. Army infantry, with interpretation by regular communications officers; the matter infuriated General Abrams in regards to the communications specialists. Before and after, there had been a much more highly classified, and only now available in heavily censored form, National Security Agency analysis of how the Communists were getting their information, which has led to a good deal of modern counterintelligence and operations security.

Some of the material from Touchdown also gave insight into the North Vietnamese intelligence system. For example, the NVA equivalent of the Defense Intelligence Agency was the Central Research Directorate (CRD) in Hanoi. COSVN intelligence staff, however, disseminated the tactically useful material. Their espionage was under the control of the Military Intelligence Sections (MIS), which were directed by the Strategic Intelligence Section (SIS) of CRD.

== U.S. direct discussions with North Vietnam ==
Henry Kissinger began secret talks with the North Vietnamese official, Lê Đức Thọ, in February 1970.

== 1971 ==
Subsequent congressional action banned further U.S. ground intervention outside the boundaries of South Vietnam, so the next major drive, Operation Lam Son 719, would have to be based on ARVN ground forces, U.S. air and artillery support, and U.S. advisory and logistical assistance.

The Vietnamization policy achieved limited rollback of Communist gains inside South Vietnam only, and was primarily aimed at providing the arms, training and funding for the South to fight and win its own war, if it had the courage and commitment to do so. By 1971, the Communists lost control of most, but not all, of the areas they had controlled in the South in 1967. The Communists still controlled many remote jungle and mountain districts, especially areas that protected the Ho Chi Minh trail.

Commanded by Hoang Xuan Lam, known more for loyalty to Nguyen Van Thieu than for military talent, Saigon's effort to strike against one of these strongholds, Operation Lam Son 719, failed in 1971. The SVN forces, with some U.S. air support, were unable to defeat PAVN regulars. While the operation is detailed in a separate sub-article, the key issues were that the ARVN were inexperienced in executing large operations. They underestimated the needed forces, and the senior officers had developed in a context that rewarded loyalty rather than competence. Let there be no doubt that there were individual ARVN commanders who would be credit to any military, but, Thieu, like those RVN leaders before him, was constantly concerned at preventing a military coup. "Promotions were won in Saigon, not in battle. And vital to advancement was the avoidance of risk, even at the price of defeat."

Thieu relieved the operational commander, head of I Corps tactical zone commander Hoang Xuan Lam with the most respected combat commander in the ARVN, Do Cao Tri. Tri died 2.5 hours later in his first helicopter crash of inspection. It is known the crash was at low altitude; it has been argued it had crashed due to mechanical failure or enemy fire. Certainly, mechanical failure was less demoralizing.

The 25,000-man ARVN force, which U.S. planners had considered half the necessary size, took admitted 25% casualties, which some estimates put as high as 50%.

== 1972 ==
By the beginning of 1972, over 400,000 U.S. personnel had been withdrawn, most of whom were combat troops. Politically, this allowed Nixon to negotiate with China and the Soviet Union without suggesting that he was compromising U.S. soldiers in the field.

North Vietnam made a major conventional attack on the South, for which the U.S. provided major air support under Operation Linebacker I, which enabled the ARVN to regain substantial control. In An Lộc, South Vietnamese forces halted the North Vietnamese advance towards Saigon capital. When North Vietnam, late in the year, left the negotiating table, Nixon authorized the destructive Operation Linebacker II campaign, which forced the North Vietnamese to negotiate; a peace treaty was signed and all U.S. combat forces were withdrawn.

== 1973 and ceasefire ==
The Armed Forces of the Republic of Vietnam had some excellent ground combat units, but still had very serious problems of command, control, and communications at division level and above.

Many units had become overdependent on American air support, and, while the RVN Air Force had not developed large-scale interdiction capability, they were also of varied quality for close air support. Beyond the issue that the Air Force was always fragmented to the corps commanders, they also did not receive various expected equipment upgrades. Photoreconnaissance was extremely limited.

Armored units had developed the greatest confidence in their ability to fight without U.S. air support. Ground commanders also learned that armored units were not for infantry support and static defenses, but needed to be used as mobile reserves. Neither North nor South Vietnam, however, had really mastered large-scale combined arms methods, compared to a NATO or Warsaw Pact level of proficiency.

In a postwar interview with the RAND Corporation, Nguyễn Bá Cẩn said: "Vietnamese officials called Vietnamization the U.S. Dollar and Vietnam Blood Sharing Plan."

== See also ==
- Withdrawal of United States troops from Iraq (2007–2011) (comparable event)
- Withdrawal of United States troops from Afghanistan (2011–2016) (comparable event)
- Indianisation (British India) – Allowing Indians into government posts formerly reserved to Europeans
