= M29 mortar =

M29
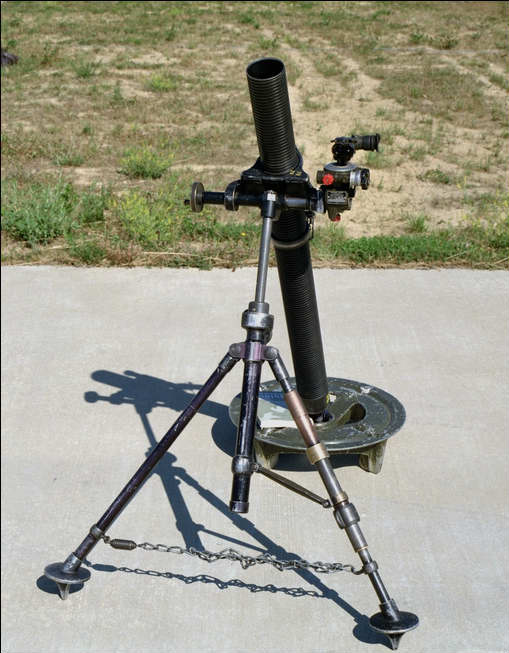
- Type: Infantry mortar
- Place of origin: United States

Service history
- In service: 1952–present
- Used by: See Users
- Wars: Korean War; Bay of Pigs Invasion; Vietnam War; Laotian Civil War; Cambodian Civil War; Lebanese Civil War; Nicaraguan Revolution; Salvadoran Civil War

Specifications
- Mass: 42.4 kilograms (93 lb)
- Caliber: 81 mm (3.2 in)
- Feed system: manual

The M29 is an American-produced 81 millimeter mortar. It began replacing the M1 mortar in U.S. service in 1952 being lighter and with greater range. It was subsequently replaced by the M252 mortar in 1987. Variants included the M29E1 and M29A1, adopted in 1964. These were produced with a hard chrome-plated bore to prolong barrel life and ease of cleaning.

The maximum rate of fire of the M29 is 27 rounds per minute, while the sustained rate of fire is 4 rounds per minute; For the M29A1 model, the maximum rate of fire is 30 rounds per minute with a sustained rate of fire of 5 rounds per minute.

The range varies depending on the type of ammunition used:

HE M374A2 (High Explosive): Minimum range 79 yards (72 m), maximum range 5,025 yards (4,595 m).
HE M362A1 (High Explosive): Minimum range 50 yards (46 m), maximum range 4,360 yards (3,987 m).
HE M43A1B1 (High Explosive): Minimum range 75 yards (69 m), maximum range 4,250 yards (3,890 m).
WP M375A2 (White Phosphorus): Minimum range 79 yards (72 m), maximum range 5,180 yards (4,737 m).
WP M370 (White Phosphorus): Minimum range 57 yards (52 m), maximum range 4,360 yards (3,987 m).
M301A3 (Illumination): Minimum range 110 yards (100 m), maximum range 3,440 yards (3,150 m).
M301A2 (Illumination): Minimum range 110 yards (100 m), maximum range 2,350 yards (2,150 m).

The weapon was usually serviced by a crew of five.

== Ammunition ==
=== High-explosive ===
- HE M374A2 − An iron projectile filled with approximately 2.1 lb (0.95 kg) of Composition B and fitted with a M170 aluminum fin assemble to provide stabilization during flight
- HE M362A1 − Similar to the M374A2, but with a steel body and a M171 aluminum fin assembly
- HE M43A1B1 − A steel projectile with a TNT filling

=== Smoke ===
- WP M375A2 − Similar to the HE M374A2, but filled with approximately 725 g (25.6 oz) of white phosphorus and fitted with a RDX bursting charge encased in an aluminum case
- WP M370 − Similar to the HE M362A1 round, but with a white phosphorus filling

=== Illuminating ===
- M301A3 − A steel projectile fitted with a time fuze, candle, parachute, and steel fin assembly. This round is designed to be fired with a minimum of two propelling charges but no more than eight. It will burst after reaching a height of 660 yd (600 m), illuminating a 1,300 yd (1,200 m) area for at least 60 seconds
- M301A2 − Similar to the M301A3, but with a tail fin 57 mm (2.2 in) shorter. This round is fired with two, up to four propelling charges. It will burst after reaching a height of 440 yd (400 m), illuminating a 1,200 yd (1,100 m) area for at least 60 seconds
- M301A1 − Similar to the M301A2, but with gas check bourrelet grooves and other minor differences in the metal parts

=== Practice ===
- M43A1 − Training projectile. It simulates the M43A1 HE weight and ballistic characteristics, but its filled with plaster of Paris, stearic acid, and a black powder pellet. On impact, the pellet and fuze booster charge provide a blast for observation purposes

== Variants ==
- M29 − Designated as T106 during development, this consists of an M29A1 barrel assembly, M23A3 mount, M53 sight and M3 aluminum baseplate
- M29A1 − An improved version, this features a reinforced barrel capable of sustaining higher rates of fire. The M29A1 also has a hard chrome-plated bore to prolong barrel life
- M125A1 mortar carrier − This is a self-propelled mount using a modified M113 chassis, originally designated as T257E1
- 81 mm SP mortar YPR − Dutch self-propelled mount using a modified YPR-765 chassis
- Type 64 − This is a modified copy of the M29A1 mortar produced by Howa for Japan Self-Defense Forces
- KM29A1 − A South Korean copy of the M29A1 produced by Daewoo, this has a maximum range of 5,170 yd (4,730 m) using a full charge at 45° elevation

== History ==
The M29 was adopted as the standard medium mortar of the United States Armed Forces in 1952 to replace the M1 mortar, a license-built copy of the French Brandt Mle 27/31. In the late 1950s Pentomic reorganization, the M29 was also chosen to replace the M19 mortar, since the commanders believed that the 60 mm (2.4 in) mortar lacked the range necessary to provide fire support in a nuclear battlefield.

After another US Army reorganization during the early 1960s, the M29 was issued to rifle companies during the Vietnam War. While its range was adequate, it was too heavy for most offensive operations, requiring a vehicle for towing. As result, several units made ad hoc use of 60 mm M19 and M2 mortars. After the war, rifle companies adopted the 60 mm M224 mortar as replacement for the M29.

The improved M29A1 entered US service in 1964. In 1984, the British-designed M252 mortar was chosen to replace it as the standard US medium mortar; By 2003, the replacement was almost complete in US Armed Forces, with some surplus barrels being converted into subcaliber training devices for M120 mortar crews.

== Users ==
=== Current ===
- Bangladesh − 11 M29A1 as of 2025
- Bolivia − 250 as of 2025
- Brazil − 18 as of 2025, used by the Marines
- Chile
- Costa Rica
- Ecuador − 357 as of 2025
- El Salvador − 151 as of 2025
- Ethiopia
- Fiji
- Honduras
- Indonesia
- Iran
- Jordan
- South Korea − Produced under license by Daewoo as the KM29A1. Used by the Army and Marines as of 2025
- Lebanon
- Liberia
- Luxembourg
- Nepal
- Nigeria
- Panama
- Philippines
- Saudi Arabia
- Suriname
- Taiwan − 160+ as of 2025, including self-propelled mounts
- Thailand
- Tunisia
- Turkey
- Yemen

=== Former ===
- Austria − Designated as 8.1 cm GrW M29/65
- Cyprus
- Denmark
- Greece
- Italy
- Japan − Produced locally as the Type 64
- Myanmar
- Netherlands
- Sweden
- United States − Replaced by the M252
- South Vietnam
- Vietnam
