= An Thoi Naval Base =

Coast Guard Base

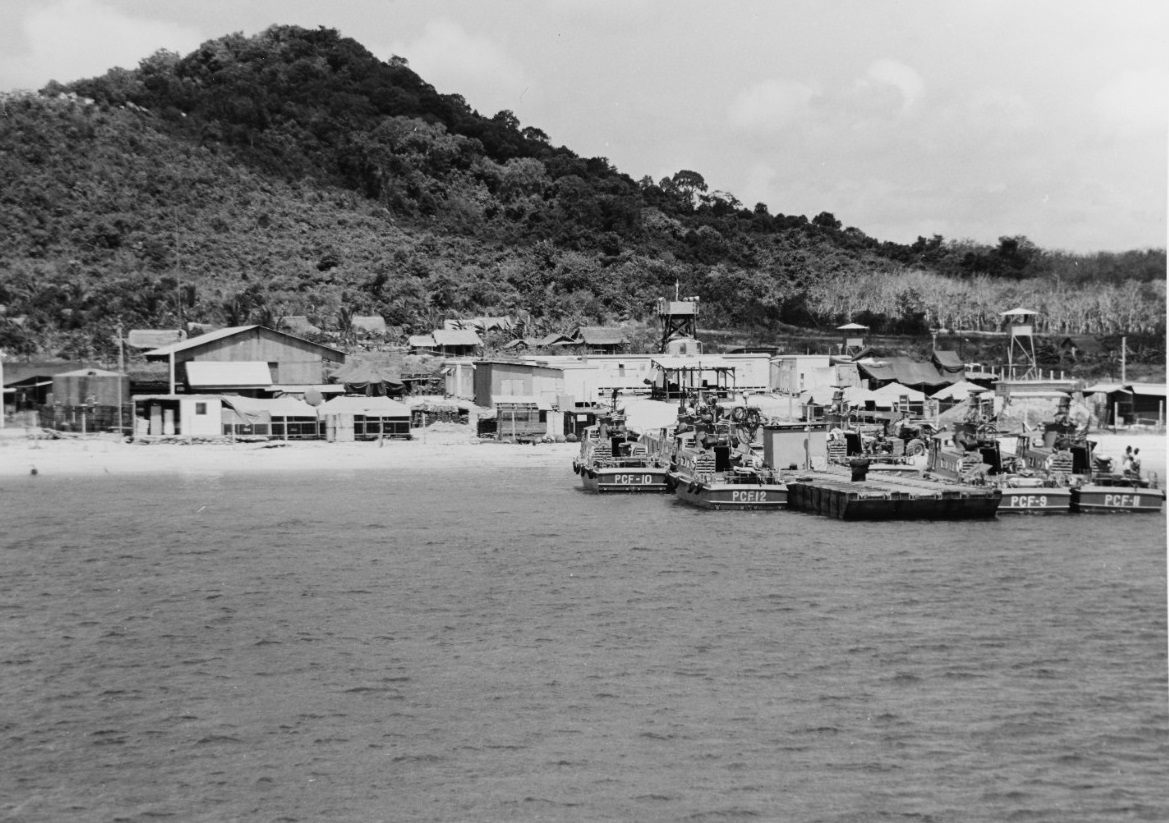
- Swift boats at An Thoi, 1966

Site information
- Type: Navy
- Controlled by: Vietnam People's Navy; Republic of Vietnam Navy; United States Navy

Location
- Coordinates: 10.019°N 104.018°E

Site history
- Built: 1960
- In use: 1960–present
- Battles/wars: Vietnam War

Garrison information
- Occupants: Division 11, Coast Guard Squadron One; Division 101, Boat Squadron One

An Thoi Naval Airfield
- IATA: none; ICAO: none

Summary
- Elevation AMSL: 16 ft / 5 m
- Interactive map of An Thoi Naval Airfield

Runways
Direction	Length		Surface
Direction	ft	m	Surface
13/31	4,000	1,219	asphalt

An Thoi Naval Base is a former Republic of Vietnam Navy (RVNN), United States Navy, and U.S. Coast Guard base in the town of An Thới, Phú Quốc island in southwest Vietnam.

== History ==
The base was originally established by the RVNN in the early 1960s as the base for Coastal District IV, renamed the 4th Naval Zone on 16 October 1963.

On 14 December 1964 personnel from the American construction company RMK-BRJ arrived at An Thoi on an RVNN motorized junk to improve the base facilities. By 30 April they had completed construction of an ocean pier.

On 24 July 1965, the newly established Division 11, Coast Guard Squadron One equipped with 9 Point-class cutters and escorted by the USS Floyd County began the transit from U.S. Naval Base Subic Bay to An Thoi arriving on 31 July and commencing Operation Market Time patrols the following day. Floyd County served as a repair and logistics ship and floating base at An Thoi until 17 September when the landing craft repair ship USS Krishna replaced it.

On 1 October 1965 the US Navy established Boat Squadron One as the umbrella unit for the newly arrived Patrol Craft Fasts (PCFs or Swift Boats) with Division 101 based at An Thoi. The first Swift Boats (PCF-3 and PCF-4) arrived at An Thoi on 30 October 1965. An Thoi became a major repair and support complexes with complete Swift Boat repair facilities as well as berthing, messing, and medical services for crews. The crews initially lived on Krishna but soon moved ashore into tents, where they were subject to Viet Cong attacks.

In January 1966 RMK-BRJ began construction of an airfield at An Thoi with a 4,000-foot (1,200 m) asphalt runway, a 40,000 square yards pierced steel planking apron, a sea wall, barracks, two warehouses, a pier, and utilities such as powerhouse, water and sewage systems.

The base was turned over to the RVNN on 28 May 1971.

Following the withdrawal of US forces from South Vietnam, the RVNN 4th Coastal Flotilla with 26 patrol craft based at An Thoi was responsible for coastal waters down to the border of An Xuyen Province.

The base remains in use by the Vietnam People's Navy as Cổng Quân Đội Nhân Dân - Vùng 5 (5th Regional Command (E Regional Command)).
