= USCGC Point Verde =

United States Coast Guard Cutter

History

United States
- Name: USCGC Point Verde (WPB-82311)
- Owner: United States Coast Guard
- Builder: Coast Guard Yard, Curtis Bay, Maryland
- Laid down: 29 June 1960
- Commissioned: 15 March 1961
- Decommissioned: 12 June 1991
- Fate: Transferred to the government of Mexico, 12 June 1991

General characteristics
- Type: Patrol Boat (WPB)
- Displacement: 60 tons
- Length: 82 ft 10 in (25.25 m)
- Beam: 17 ft 7 in (5.36 m) max
- Draft: 5 ft 11 in (1.80 m)
- Propulsion: 1961 • 2 × 600 hp (447 kW) Cummins diesel engines; 1990 • 2 × 800 hp (597 kW) Caterpillar diesel engines
- Speed: 16.8 knots (31.1 km/h; 19.3 mph)
- Range: 577 nmi (1,069 km) at 14.5 kn (26.9 km/h; 16.7 mph); 1,271 nmi (2,354 km) at 10.7 kn (19.8 km/h; 12.3 mph)
- Complement: Domestic service : 8 men
- Armament: 1961 • 1 × Oerlikon 20 mm cannon

USCGC Point Verde (WPB-82311) was an 82-foot (25 m) Point class cutter constructed at the Coast Guard Yard at Curtis Bay, Maryland in 1961 for use as a law enforcement and search and rescue patrol boat. Since the Coast Guard policy in 1961 was not to name cutters under 100 feet (30 m) in length, it was designated as WPB-82311 when commissioned and acquired the name Point Verde in January 1964 when the Coast Guard started naming all cutters longer than 65 feet (20 m).

== Design and construction details ==
Point Verde was built to accommodate an 8-man crew. She was powered by two 600 hp (447 kW) VT600 Cummins diesel main drive engines and had two five-bladed 42 in (1.1 m) propellers. The main drive engines were later replaced by 800 hp (597 kW) VT800 Cummins engines. Water tank capacity was 1,550 U.S. gallons (5,900 L) and fuel tank capacity was 1,840 U.S. gallons (7,000 L) at 95% full. After 1990 she was refit with 800 hp (597 kW) Caterpillar diesel main drive engines. Engine exhaust was ported through the transom rather than through a conventional stack and this permitted a 360-degree view from the bridge; a feature that was very useful in search and rescue work as well as a combat environment.

The design specifications for Point Verde included a steel hull for durability and an aluminum superstructure and longitudinally framed construction was used to save weight. Ease of operation with a small crew size was possible because of the non-manned main drive engine spaces. Controls and alarms located on the bridge allowed one man operation of the cutter thus eliminating a live engineer watch in the engine room. Because of design, four men could operate the cutter; however, the need for resting watchstanders brought the crew size to eight men for normal domestic service. The screws were designed for ease of replacement and could be changed without removing the cutter from the water. A clutch-in idle speed of three knots helped to conserve fuel on lengthy patrols and an eighteen knot maximum speed could get the cutter on scene quickly. Air-conditioned interior spaces were a part of the original design for the Point class cutter. Interior access to the deckhouse was through a watertight door on the starboard side aft of the deckhouse. The deckhouse contained the cabin for the officer-in-charge and the executive petty officer. The deckhouse also included a small arms locker, scuttlebutt, a small desk and head. Access to the lower deck and engine room was down a ladder. At the bottom of the ladder was the galley, mess and recreation deck. A watertight door at the front of the mess bulkhead led to the main crew quarters which was ten feet long and included six bunks that could be stowed, three bunks on each side. Forward of the bunks was the crew's head complete with a compact sink, shower and commode.

== History ==
After delivery in 1961, Point Verde was assigned a homeport of Venice, Louisiana, where she served as a law enforcement and search and rescue patrol boat. In September 1965 she assisted in cleanup operations in the Gulf of Mexico after Hurricane Betsy. Escort duty was performed in November 1965 of a raised barge carrying chlorine. After Norwegian MV Sage Sky struck a submerged object, Point Verde escorted her to Southwest Pass. The crew of Point Verde used their law enforcement experience after a knife fight aboard MV Ashley Lykes by taking two seamen into custody near Southwest Pass on 26 February 1967. On 2 April 1967 she escorted the disabled FV Lovie D. to South Pass. On 30 October 1967 she medevaced a passenger from MV Bashkara Jayanti 380 miles southeast of New Orleans. Point Verde assisted in fighting a fire on MV Gulf Supreme in Plaquemines Parish, Louisiana on 25 December 1967. She towed a disabled pleasure craft near Mobile Point to Dauphin Island, Alabama on 30 October 1968. While in dry dock at New Orleans she sustained a fire during January 1969.

From 1969 to 1979 Point Verde was homeported at Dauphin Island. After 1979 she was stationed at Pensacola, Florida. On 12 June 1991 Point Verde was decommissioned and transferred to the government of Mexico, who renamed her ARM Punto Morro (P 60).
