= USCGC Point Roberts =

United States Coast Guard cutter

History

United States
- Name: USCGC Point Roberts (WPB-82332)
- Namesake: Point Roberts, Whatcom County, Washington
- Owner: United States Coast Guard
- Builder: Coast Guard Yard, Curtis Bay, Maryland
- Commissioned: 6 June 1962
- Decommissioned: 14 February 1992
- Fate: Transferred to Environmental Protection Agency as Lake Explorer, Duluth, Minnesota, 1992;

General characteristics
- Type: Patrol Boat (WPB)
- Displacement: 60 tons
- Length: 82 ft 10 in (25.25 m)
- Beam: 17 ft 7 in (5.36 m) max
- Draft: 5 ft 11 in (1.80 m)
- Propulsion: 1962 • 2 × 800 hp (597 kW) Cummins diesel engines; 1990 • 2 × 800 hp (597 kW) Caterpillar diesel engines
- Speed: 22.9 knots (42.4 km/h; 26.4 mph)
- Range: 542 nmi (1,004 km) at 18 kn (33 km/h; 21 mph); 1,500 nmi (2,800 km) at 9.4 kn (17.4 km/h; 10.8 mph)
- Complement: Domestic service : 8 men
- Armament: 1962 • 1 × Oerlikon 20 mm cannon

USCGC Point Roberts (WPB-82332) was an 82-foot (25 m) Point class cutter constructed at the Coast Guard Yard at Curtis Bay, Maryland in 1962 for use as a law enforcement and search and rescue patrol boat. Since the Coast Guard policy in 1961 was not to name cutters under 100 feet (30 m) in length, it was designated as WPB-82332 when commissioned and acquired the name Point Roberts in January 1964 when the Coast Guard started naming all cutters longer than 65 feet (20 m).

== Design and construction details ==
Point Roberts was built to accommodate an 8-man crew. She was powered by two 800 hp (597 kW) VT800 Cummins diesel main drive engines and had two five-bladed 42 in (1.1 m) propellers. Water tank capacity was 1,550 U.S. gallons (5,900 L) and fuel tank capacity was 1,840 U.S. gallons (7,000 L) at 95% full. After 1990 she was refit with 800 hp (597 kW) Caterpillar diesel main drive engines. Engine exhaust was ported through the transom rather than through a conventional stack and this permitted a 360-degree view from the bridge; a feature that was very useful in search and rescue work as well as a combat environment.

The design specifications for Point Roberts included a steel hull for durability and an aluminum superstructure and longitudinally framed construction was used to save weight. Ease of operation with a small crew size was possible because of the non-manned main drive engine spaces. Controls and alarms located on the bridge allowed one man operation of the cutter thus eliminating a live engineer watch in the engine room. Because of design, four men could operate the cutter; however, the need for resting watchstanders brought the crew size to eight men for normal domestic service. The screws were designed for ease of replacement and could be changed without removing the cutter from the water. A clutch-in idle speed of three knots helped to conserve fuel on lengthy patrols and an eighteen knot maximum speed could get the cutter on scene quickly. Air-conditioned interior spaces were a part of the original design for the Point class cutter. Interior access to the deckhouse was through a watertight door on the starboard side aft of the deckhouse. The deckhouse contained the cabin for the officer-in-charge and the executive petty officer. The deckhouse also included a small arms locker, scuttlebutt, a small desk and head. Access to the lower deck and engine room was down a ladder. At the bottom of the ladder was the galley, mess and recreation deck. A watertight door at the front of the mess bulkhead led to the main crew quarters which was ten feet long and included six bunks that could be stowed, three bunks on each side. Forward of the bunks was the crew's head complete with a compact sink, shower and commode.

== History ==
After delivery in 1961, Point Roberts was assigned a homeport of Mayport, Florida, where she served as a law enforcement and search and rescue patrol boat until decommissioning in 1992. On 26 February 1965, she towed the disabled fishing vessel Cherry Lee 25 miles southeast of St. Augustine, Florida, to Mayport during rough weather. On 15 May 1966, she rescued a skin diver off Jacksonville, Florida. On 12 May 1968, she rescued three from fishing vessel Kingfisher 5 miles east of the mouth of the St. Johns River. On 21 July 1968, she medevaced injured seamen from the tanker Transhudson. On 12 January 1969, she escorted the distressed fishing vessel Eagle 25 miles northwest of Key West, Florida, to that port. On 4 August 1970, she medevaced a crewman from the Japan Maritime Self-Defense Force training ship Katori off Jacksonville. On 28 November 1982, she helped seize motor vessel Lago Izabel and fishing vessel Gigi 120 miles east of Georgia carrying 25 short tons (23,000 kg) of marijuana. In January and February 1986, she recovered debris from Space Shuttle Challenger off Cape Canaveral, Florida. In August 1988, she escorted the Honduran motor vessel Unicorn Express into Mayport, where over 1,000 lb (450 kg) of cocaine were found in a secret compartment.

In February 1992 Point Roberts was decommissioned and transferred to the Environmental Protection Agency as research vessel Lake Explorer stationed at Duluth, Minnesota.
