= USCGC Point Ledge =

United States Coast Guard cutter

History

United States
- Name: USCGC Point Ledge (WPB-82334)
- Owner: United States Coast Guard
- Builder: Coast Guard Yard, Curtis Bay, Maryland
- Commissioned: 18 July 1962
- Decommissioned: 3 August 1998
- Fate: Transferred to Venezuela; 30 August 1998

General characteristics
- Type: Patrol Boat (WPB)
- Displacement: 60 tons
- Length: 82 ft 10 in (25.25 m)
- Beam: 17 ft 7 in (5.36 m) max
- Draft: 5 ft 11 in (1.80 m)
- Propulsion: 1962 • 2 × 800 hp (597 kW) Cummins diesel engines; 1990 • 2 × 800 hp (597 kW) Caterpillar diesel engines
- Speed: 22.9 knots (42.4 km/h; 26.4 mph)
- Range: 542 nmi (1,004 km) at 18 kn (33 km/h; 21 mph); 1,500 nmi (2,800 km) at 9.4 kn (17.4 km/h; 10.8 mph)
- Complement: 8 men (1962); 2 officers, 8 men (1965)
- Armament: 1962 • 1 × Oerlikon 20 mm cannon

USCGC Point Ledge (WPB-82334) was an 82-foot (25 m) Point class cutter constructed at the Coast Guard Yard at Curtis Bay, Maryland in 1962 for use as a law enforcement and search and rescue patrol boat. Since the Coast Guard policy in 1962 was not to name cutters under 100 feet (30 m) in length, it was designated as WPB-82334 when commissioned and acquired the name Point Ledge in January 1964 when the Coast Guard started naming all cutters longer than 65 feet (20 m).

== Construction and design details ==
Point Ledge was built to accommodate an 8-man crew. She was powered by two 800 hp (597 kW) VT800 Cummins diesel main drive engines and had two five-bladed 42 in (1.1 m) propellers. Water tank capacity was 1,550 U.S. gallons (5,900 L) and fuel tank capacity was 1,840 U.S. gallons (7,000 L) at 95% full. After 1990 she was refit with 800 hp (597 kW) Caterpillar diesel main drive engines. Engine exhaust was ported through the transom rather than through a conventional stack and this permitted a 360-degree view from the bridge; a feature that was very useful in search and rescue work as well as a combat environment.

The design specifications for Point Ledge included a steel hull for durability and an aluminum superstructure and longitudinally framed construction was used to save weight. Ease of operation with a small crew size was possible because of the non-manned main drive engine spaces. Controls and alarms located on the bridge allowed one man operation of the cutter thus eliminating a live engineer watch in the engine room. Because of design, four men could operate the cutter; however, the need for resting watchstanders brought the crew size to eight men for normal domestic service. The screws were designed for ease of replacement and could be changed without removing the cutter from the water. A clutch-in idle speed of three knots helped to conserve fuel on lengthy patrols and an eighteen knot maximum speed could get the cutter on scene quickly. Air-conditioned interior spaces were a part of the original design for the Point class cutter. Interior access to the deckhouse was through a watertight door on the starboard side aft of the deckhouse. The deckhouse contained the cabin for the officer-in-charge and the executive petty officer. The deckhouse also included a small arms locker, scuttlebutt, a small desk and head. Access to the lower deck and engine room was down a ladder. At the bottom of the ladder was the galley, mess and recreation deck. A watertight door at the front of the mess bulkhead led to the main crew quarters which was ten feet long and included six bunks that could be stowed, three bunks on each side. Forward of the bunks was the crew's head complete with a compact sink, shower and commode.

== History ==
Point Ledge was stationed at Fort Bragg, California, from 1962 to January 1994 and was used for law enforcement and search and rescue operations. On 31 May 1965 she rescued the crew from F/V Christine as it sank 20 miles northwest of Fort Bragg. On 5 September 1966, she helped rescue four from pleasure craft Aquilo and unsuccessfully fought a fire three miles off Fort Bragg. On 7 March 1968, she rescued the pilot from a downed U.S. Air Force F-101 off Eureka, California. On 4 November 1976, she engaged in the rescue of three survivors from the F/V Pacific Pearl, which was struck by an unknown vessel 24 miles from Point Cabrillo. On the night of 27 December 1982, she helped fight fire at a fishery on the Noyo River.

From January 1994 to 1996, she was stationed at St. Thomas, Virgin Islands where she suffered heavy damage by Hurricane Marilyn in September 1995 and required extensive repairs, which were completed in New Orleans, Louisiana. In March 1996, the newly repaired Point Ledge reported for duty in Mobile, Alabama. She was decommissioned in Mobile on 3 August 1998. She was transferred to Venezuela on 30 August 1998.
