= USCGC Point Glass =

United States Coast Guard cutter

History

United States
- Name: USCGC Point Glass (WPB-82336)
- Namesake: Point Glass, Tongass National Forest, Alaska
- Owner: United States Coast Guard
- Builder: Coast Guard Yard, Curtis Bay, Maryland
- Commissioned: 29 August 1962
- Decommissioned: 3 April 2000
- Identification: MMSI number: 367326080; Callsign: WDE2498
- Fate: Transferred to NOAA

General characteristics
- Type: Patrol Boat (WPB)
- Displacement: 60 tons
- Length: 82 ft 10 in (25.25 m)
- Beam: 17 ft 7 in (5.36 m) max
- Draft: 5 ft 11 in (1.80 m)
- Propulsion: 1962 • 2 × 800 hp (597 kW) Cummins diesel engines; 1990 • 2 × 800 hp (597 kW) Caterpillar diesel engines
- Speed: 22.9 knots (42.4 km/h; 26.4 mph)
- Range: 542 nmi (1,004 km) at 18 kn (33 km/h; 21 mph); 1,500 nmi (2,800 km) at 9.4 kn (17.4 km/h; 10.8 mph)
- Complement: Domestic service : 8 men
- Armament: 1962 • 1 × Oerlikon 20 mm cannon

USCGC Point Glass (WPB-82336) was an 82-foot (25 m) Point class cutter constructed at the Coast Guard Yard at Curtis Bay, Maryland in 1962 for use as a law enforcement and search and rescue patrol boat. Since the Coast Guard policy in 1962 was not to name cutters under 100 feet (30 m) in length, it was designated as WPB-82336 when commissioned and acquired the name Point Glass in January 1964 when the Coast Guard started naming all cutters longer than 65 feet (20 m).

== Construction and design details ==
Point Glass was built to accommodate an 8-man crew. She was powered by two 800 hp (597 kW) VT800 Cummins diesel main drive engines and had two five-bladed 42 in (1.1 m) propellers. Water tank capacity was 1,550 U.S. gallons (5,900 L) and fuel tank capacity was 1,840 U.S. gallons (7,000 L) at 95% full. After 1990 she was refit with 800 hp (597 kW) Caterpillar diesel main drive engines. Engine exhaust was ported through the transom rather than through a conventional stack and this permitted a 360-degree view from the bridge; a feature that was very useful in search and rescue work as well as a combat environment.

The design specifications for Point Glass included a steel hull for durability and an aluminum superstructure and longitudinally framed construction was used to save weight. Ease of operation with a small crew size was possible because of the non-manned main drive engine spaces. Controls and alarms located on the bridge allowed one man operation of the cutter thus eliminating a live engineer watch in the engine room. Because of design, four men could operate the cutter; however, the need for resting watchstanders brought the crew size to eight men for normal domestic service. The screws were designed for ease of replacement and could be changed without removing the cutter from the water. A clutch-in idle speed of three knots helped to conserve fuel on lengthy patrols and an eighteen knot maximum speed could get the cutter on scene quickly. Air-conditioned interior spaces were a part of the original design for the Point class cutter. Interior access to the deckhouse was through a watertight door on the starboard side aft of the deckhouse. The deckhouse contained the cabin for the officer-in-charge and the executive petty officer. The deckhouse also included a small arms locker, scuttlebutt, a small desk and head. Access to the lower deck and engine room was down a ladder. At the bottom of the ladder was the galley, mess and recreation deck. A watertight door at the front of the mess bulkhead led to the main crew quarters which was ten feet long and included six bunks that could be stowed, three bunks on each side. Forward of the bunks was the crew's head complete with a compact sink, shower and commode.

== History ==
Point Glass was stationed at Tacoma, Washington, from 1962 to 1970 and was used for law enforcement and search and rescue operations. While moored at Tacoma she was rammed by the Canadian tug Marpole on 26 May 1965 sustaining damage. After 1971 she was homeported at Gig Harbor, Washington.

In 1990 she was transferred to Fort Lauderdale, Florida. During the morning hours of 17 April 1992 Point Glass assisted the disabled MV G.H. Vanderburgh which was floundering in breaking surf and in danger of grounding on a coral reef six miles southwest of Fowey Rocks Light near Miami, Florida. Point Glass successfully navigated 34 miles through 8–10-foot seas to the distressed vessel and determined that she had crossed over the outer reef line and was about to damage the environmentally sensitive coral reef at Biscayne National Park. After passing a line to G.H. Vanderburgh, she towed her to safety, thereby saving the coral reef from damage and preventing harm to the seven-man crew of the vessel. For these actions, the Point Glass and her crew were awarded the Coast Guard Meritorious Unit Commendation with Operational Distinguishing Device. In 1998, Point Glass and her crew were awarded the Coast Guard Meritorious Team Commendation with the Operational Distinguishing Device for participating in the Shell Air/Sea show at Fort Lauderdale by being part of the task force enforcing a 3 square mile safety zone near the event and showing the audience a search and rescue demonstration as well as a high speed patrol boat pass.

Point Glass was decommissioned on 3 April 2000 and ownership was transferred to National Oceanic and Atmospheric Administration (NOAA) for use at the Flower Garden Banks National Marine Sanctuary where she served as NOAA Research Vessel Point Glass until sold to Point Glass LLC in 2006. The vessel is now used to support the Sea Scout program, part of the Boy Scouts of America, in order to teach navigation and seamanship skills.
