= USCGC Point Chico =

United States Coast Guard cutter

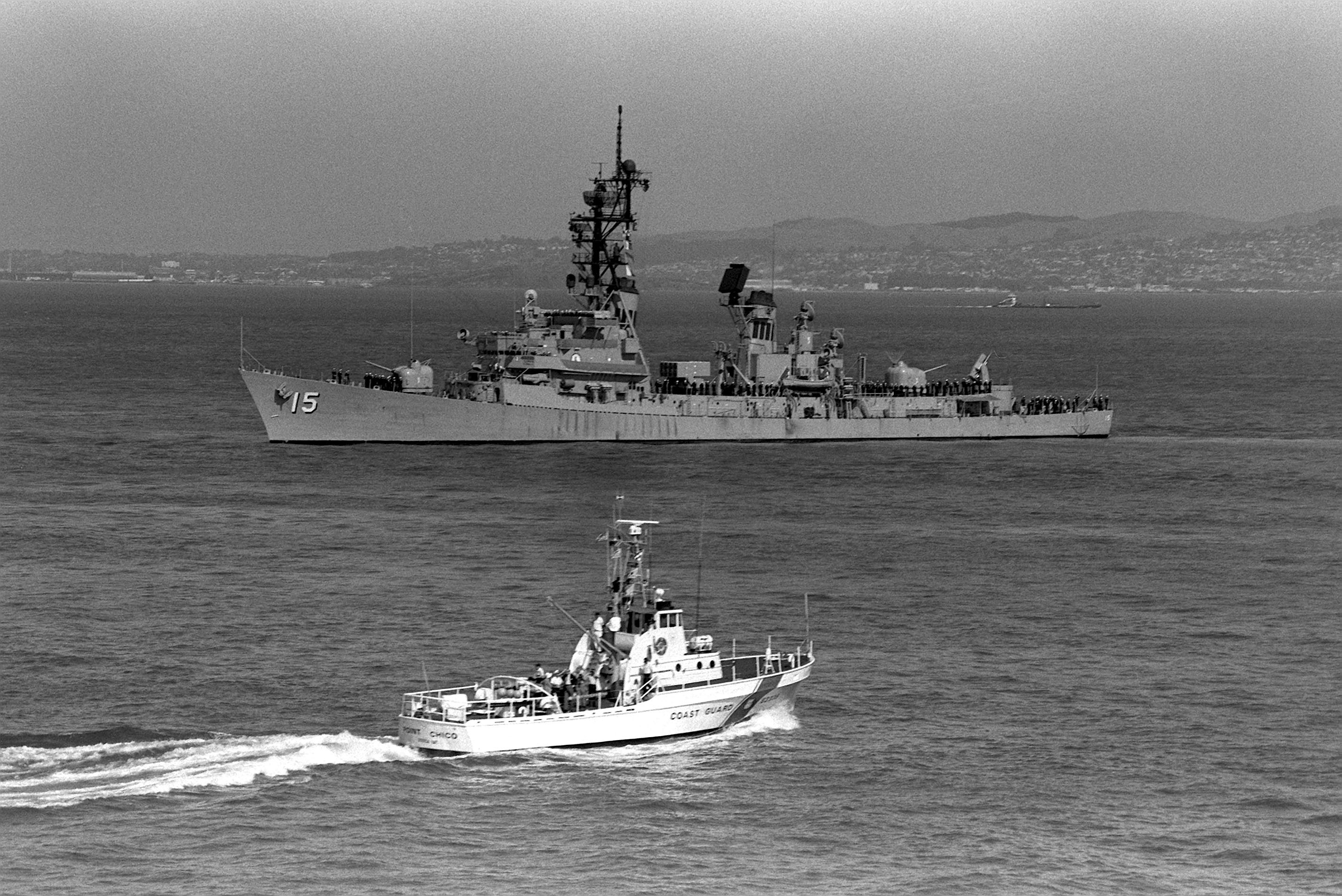
- Point Chico with USS Berkeley (DDG-15)

History

United States
- Name: USCGC Point Chico (WPB-82339)
- Owner: United States Coast Guard
- Builder: Coast Guard Yard, Curtis Bay, Maryland
- Commissioned: 29 October 1962
- Decommissioned: 24 June 2001
- Fate: Transferred to Costa Rica

General characteristics
- Type: Patrol Boat (WPB)
- Displacement: 60 tons
- Length: 82 ft 10 in (25.25 m)
- Beam: 17 ft 7 in (5.36 m) max
- Draft: 5 ft 11 in (1.80 m)
- Propulsion: 1962 • 2 × 800 hp (597 kW) Cummins diesel engines; 1990 • 2 × 800 hp (597 kW) Caterpillar diesel engines
- Speed: 22.9 knots (42.4 km/h; 26.4 mph)
- Range: 542 nmi (1,004 km) at 18 kn (33 km/h; 21 mph); 1,500 nmi (2,800 km) at 9.4 kn (17.4 km/h; 10.8 mph)
- Complement: Domestic service : 8 men
- Armament: 1962 • 1 × Oerlikon 20 mm cannon

USCGC Point Chico (WPB-82339) was an 82-foot (25 m) Point class cutter constructed at the Coast Guard Yard at Curtis Bay, Maryland in 1962 for use as a law enforcement and search and rescue patrol boat. Since the Coast Guard policy in 1962 was not to name cutters under 100 feet (30 m) in length, it was designated as WPB-82339 when commissioned and acquired the name Point Chico in January 1964 when the Coast Guard started naming all cutters longer than 65 feet (20 m).

== Construction and design details ==
Point Chico was built to accommodate an 8-man crew. She was powered by two 800 hp (597 kW) VT800 Cummins diesel main drive engines and had two five-bladed 42 in (1.1 m) propellers. Water tank capacity was 1,550 U.S. gallons (5,900 L) and fuel tank capacity was 1,840 U.S. gallons (7,000 L) at 95% full. After 1990 she was refit with 800 hp (597 kW) Caterpillar diesel main drive engines. Engine exhaust was ported through the transom rather than through a conventional stack and this permitted a 360-degree view from the bridge; a feature that was very useful in search and rescue work as well as a combat environment.

The design specifications for Point Chico included a steel hull for durability and an aluminum superstructure and longitudinally framed construction was used to save weight. Ease of operation with a small crew size was possible because of the non-manned main drive engine spaces. Controls and alarms located on the bridge allowed one man operation of the cutter thus eliminating a live engineer watch in the engine room. Because of design, four men could operate the cutter; however, the need for resting watchstanders brought the crew size to eight men for normal domestic service. The screws were designed for ease of replacement and could be changed without removing the cutter from the water. A clutch-in idle speed of three knots helped to conserve fuel on lengthy patrols and an eighteen knot maximum speed could get the cutter on scene quickly. Air-conditioned interior spaces were a part of the original design for the Point class cutter. Interior access to the deckhouse was through a watertight door on the starboard side aft of the deckhouse. The deckhouse contained the cabin for the officer-in-charge and the executive petty officer. The deckhouse also included a small arms locker, scuttlebutt, a small desk and head. Access to the lower deck and engine room was down a ladder. At the bottom of the ladder was the galley, mess and recreation deck. A watertight door at the front of the mess bulkhead led to the main crew quarters which was ten feet long and included six bunks that could be stowed, three bunks on each side. Forward of the bunks was the crew's head complete with a compact sink, shower and commode.

== History ==
After commissioning, Point Chico was stationed at Sausalito, California, from 1963 to 1965 where she was used for law enforcement and search and rescue operations. On 14 June 1965 she escorted the damaged FV Salmon Queen from eighteen miles southwest of Point Bonita, California to Sausalito. In 1966 her homeport was shifted to Benicia, California where she helped fight a barge fire in San Francisco harbor on 26 September 1966.

In 1974 Point Chico was transferred to Yerba Buena Island. She and her crew were awarded the Coast Guard Unit Commendation for her part in fighting a fire that engulfed Pier 37 at the Port of San Francisco's Embarcadero and saving the historic ferry boat San Leandro. She received a second unit commendation for rescue and relief operations during flooding of the Noyo River basin in October 1977. On 7 April 1980 she towed the disabled 633-foot (193 m) tanker Austin into the wind 35 miles northwest of Morro Bay, buying time for engineers working on damaged wiring as the tanker drifted toward the Piedras Blancas.

After 4 August 1980 Point Chico was stationed at Bodega Bay, California. On 9 September 1983, she towed the disabled pleasure craft Sabra into San Francisco. On 16 September, she towed the disabled FV Huyne Long from off Farallon Island to San Francisco. On 8 November she rescued two divers off Mendocino, California.

Point Chico received her third unit commendation for participation in the Olympic Security Task Force during the 1984 Summer Olympics held at Los Angeles, California from 7 July to 15 August 1984. She was awarded the Coast Guard Meritorious Unit Commendation for search and rescue and law enforcement operations from 1 January to 9 April 1985. when her crew seized the FV Oregon Beaver with 45,000 pounds (20,000 kg) of marijuana on board. On 7 June 1985, Point Chico was adopted as the official Coast Guard cutter of the City of Sacramento.

Point Chico was decommissioned 24 June 2001 and transferred to Costa Rica.
