= USCGC Point Thatcher =

United States Coast Guard cutter

Coordinates: 38.373°N 75.005°W

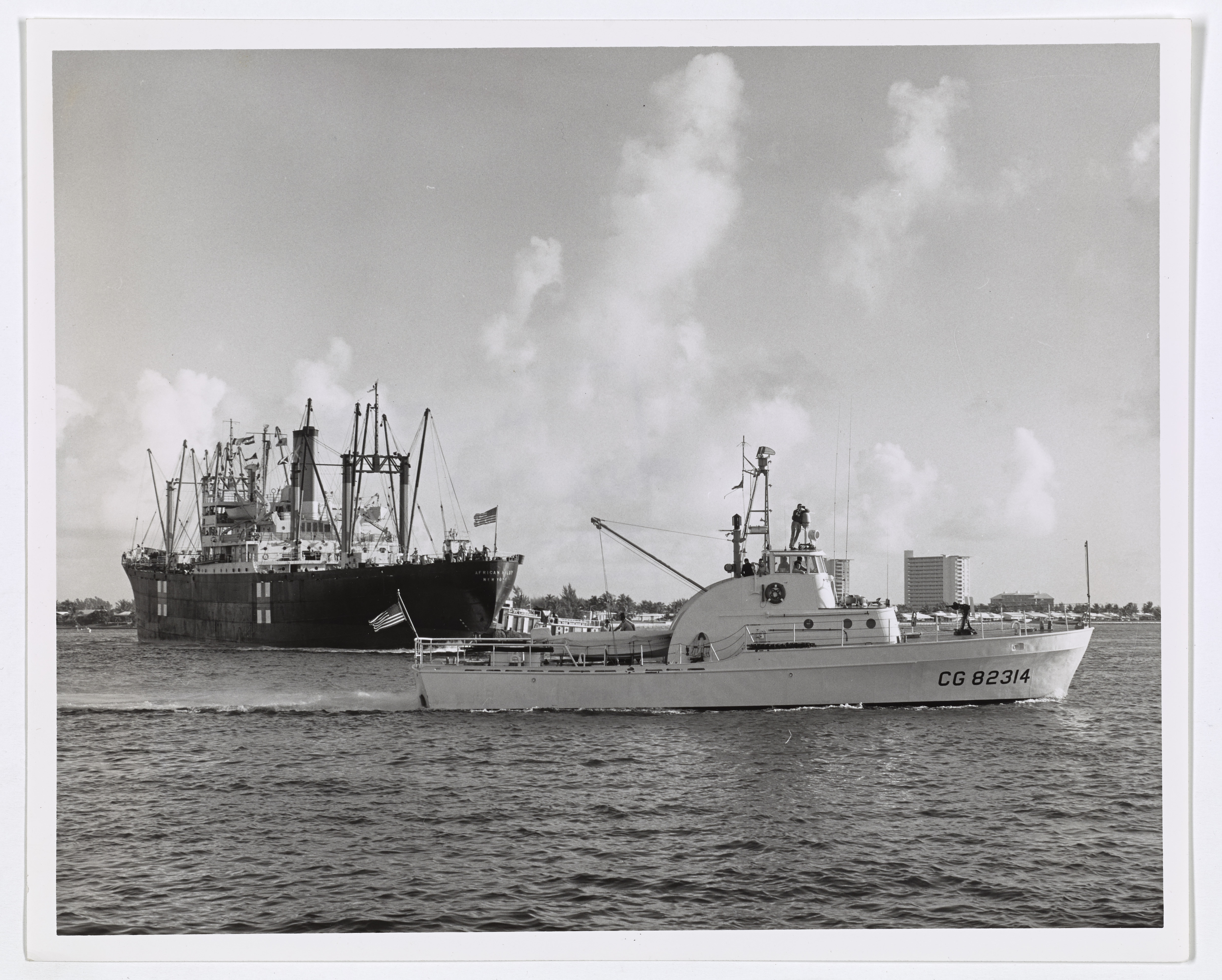
- Coast Guard Patrol Boat CG-82314 Escorts the SS African Pilot into Port Everglades

History

United States
- Name: USCGC Point Thatcher (WPB-82314)
- Namesake: Point Thatcher, Tongass National Forest, Sitka, Alaska
- Owner: United States Coast Guard
- Builder: Coast Guard Yard, Curtis Bay, Maryland
- Laid down: 11 July 1960
- Launched: 24 March 1961
- Commissioned: 13 September 1961
- Decommissioned: 13 March 1992
- Fate: Sunk as artificial reef off Ocean City, Maryland in 2000

General characteristics
- Type: Patrol Boat (WPB)
- Displacement: 60 tons
- Length: 82 ft 10 in (25.25 m)
- Beam: 17 ft 7 in (5.36 m) max
- Draft: 5 ft 11 in (1.80 m)
- Propulsion: 1961 • 2 × 1,000 hp (746 kW) gas turbine engines; with 2 controllable-pitch propellers
- Speed: 1963 • 22.9 knots (42.4 km/h; 26.4 mph)
- Complement: Domestic service (1961) 8 men; (1965) 2 officers, 8 men
- Sensors & processing systems: 1961 • SPN-11 radar, CR-103
- Armament: 1961 • 1 × Oerlikon 20 mm cannon

USCGC Point Thatcher (WPB-82314) was an 82-foot (25 m) Point class cutter constructed at the Coast Guard Yard at Curtis Bay, Maryland in 1961 for use as a law enforcement and search and rescue patrol boat. Since the Coast Guard policy in 1961 was not to name cutters under 100 feet (30 m) in length, it was designated as WPB-82314 when commissioned and acquired the name Point Thatcher in January 1964 when the Coast Guard started naming all cutters longer than 65 feet (20 m). Point Thatcher was unique because it was the only cutter that was built in the class that was powered using gas turbine main drive engines.

== Construction and design details ==
Point Thatcher was built to accommodate an 8-man crew. She was powered by two 1,000 hp (746 kW) gas turbine engines and had two variable-pitch propellers. This was the only Point class cutter equipped in this manner and the Thatcher was used by the Coast Guard to evaluate gas turbine propulsion. Water tank capacity was 1,550 U.S. gallons (5,900 L) and fuel tank capacity was 1,840 U.S. gallons (7,000 L) at 95% full.

The design specifications for Point Thatcher included a steel hull for durability and an aluminum superstructure and longitudinally framed construction was used to save weight. Ease of operation with a small crew size was possible because of the non-manned main drive engine spaces. Controls and alarms located on the bridge allowed one man operation of the cutter thus eliminating a live engineer watch in the engine room. Because of design, four men could operate the cutter; however, the need for resting watchstanders brought the crew size to eight men for normal domestic service. The screws were designed for ease of replacement and could be changed without removing the cutter from the water. A clutch-in idle speed of three knots helped to conserve fuel on lengthy patrols and an eighteen knot maximum speed could get the cutter on scene quickly. Air-conditioned interior spaces were a part of the original design for the Point class cutter. Interior access to the deckhouse was through a watertight door on the starboard side aft of the deckhouse. The deckhouse contained the cabin for the officer-in-charge and the executive petty officer. The deckhouse also included a small arms locker, scuttlebutt, a small desk and head. Access to the lower deck and engine room was down a ladder. At the bottom of the ladder was the galley, mess and recreation deck. A watertight door at the front of the mess bulkhead led to the main crew quarters which was ten feet long and included six bunks that could be stowed, three bunks on each side. Forward of the bunks was the crew's head complete with a compact sink, shower and commode.

== History ==
After commissioning Point Thatcher was stationed at Miami, Florida where she was used for law enforcement and search and rescue operations. She was moved to Norfolk, Virginia in 1964. On 16 June 1965, she stood by the Norwegian MV Blue Master and the USS Hartley following a collision off Cape Henry. On 24 July she escorted FV Explorer with casualties on board to Little Creek, Virginia.

From early 1966 to early 1971 she was once again homeported at Miami. On 19 February 1966 she transported 16 Cuban refugees from Gun Cay, Bahamas to Miami. On 4 October while responding to the grounding of MV Transporter off Miami Beach, she was herself grounded and holed. The crew was forced to abandon ship. After being refloated on 9 October, she was towed to Miami Beach for repair and refit. On 28 March 1967, she embarked seven Cuban stowaways from MV Amfialia and delivered them to Key West, Florida. On 31 May 1970 the refueled and escorted a distressed 18-foot pleasure craft to Miami. Her homeport was shifted to Sarasota, Florida in March 1971. On 28 December 1977 she seized the MV Marania for carrying contraband.

In 1985 Point Thatcher was moved to Nokomis, Florida. On 7 May 1985 she rescued three persons from a raft in the Gulf of Mexico. On 2–3 March 1987 she towed the disabled FV Beach King from a point 225 miles south of Mobile, Alabama to safety at St. Petersburg, Florida during a storm. Later the same week on 7–8 March, she towed the disabled FV Miss Ann and the pleasure craft Grenada II to Fort Myers, Florida in 18-foot seas.

When USCGC Acushnet was transferred to the Pacific coast in July 1990, Point Thatcher joined her sister cutter USCGC Point Estero in August at Gulfport, Mississippi where their primary mission was law enforcement and Point Thatcher set a record during that time for 14 drug arrests in coastal waters.

Point Thatcher was decommissioned 13 March 1992 and moved to USCG Training Center Cape May, New Jersey for use as a training hulk. In the spring of 2000 she was sunk as an artificial reef off Ocean City, Maryland.
