= USCGC Point Hope =

United States Coast Guard cutter

History

United States
- Name: USCGC Point Hope (WPB-82302)
- Namesake: Point Hope, Alaska
- Owner: United States Coast Guard
- Builder: Coast Guard Yard, Curtis Bay, Maryland
- Commissioned: 5 October 1960
- Decommissioned: 3 May 1991

General characteristics
- Type: Patrol Boat (WPB)
- Displacement: 60 tons
- Length: 82 ft 10 in (25.25 m)
- Beam: 17 ft 7 in (5.36 m) max
- Draft: 5 ft 11 in (1.80 m)
- Propulsion: 2 × 600 hp (447 kW) Cummins diesel engines
- Speed: 16.8 knots (31.1 km/h; 19.3 mph)
- Range: 577 nmi (1,069 km) at 14.5 kn (26.9 km/h; 16.7 mph); 1,271 nmi (2,354 km) at 10.7 kn (19.8 km/h; 12.3 mph)
- Complement: Domestic service : 8 men
- Armament: 1960; 1 × Oerlikon 20 mm cannon

USCGC Point Hope (WPB-82302) was an 82-foot (25 m) Point class cutter constructed at the Coast Guard Yard at Curtis Bay, Maryland in 1960 for use as a law enforcement and search and rescue patrol boat. Since the Coast Guard policy in 1960 was not to name cutters under 100 feet (30 m) in length, it was designated as WPB-82302 when commissioned and acquired the name Point Hope in January 1964 when the Coast Guard started naming all cutters longer than 65 feet (20 m).

== Design and construction details ==
Point Hope was built to accommodate an 8-man crew. She was powered by two 600 hp (447 kW) VT600 Cummins diesel main drive engines and had two five-bladed 42 in (1.1 m) propellers. The main drive engines were later replaced by 800 hp (597 kW) VT800 Cummins engines. Water tank capacity was 1,550 U.S. gallons (5,900 L) and fuel tank capacity was 1,840 U.S. gallons (7,000 L) at 95% full. After 1990 she was refit with 800 hp (597 kW) Caterpillar diesel main drive engines. Engine exhaust was ported through the transom rather than through a conventional stack and this permitted a 360-degree view from the bridge; a feature that was very useful in search and rescue work as well as a combat environment.

The design specifications for Point Hope included a steel hull for durability and an aluminum superstructure and longitudinally framed construction was used to save weight. Ease of operation with a small crew size was possible because of the non-manned main drive engine spaces. Controls and alarms located on the bridge allowed one man operation of the cutter thus eliminating a live engineer watch in the engine room. Because of design, four men could operate the cutter; however, the need for resting watchstanders brought the crew size to eight men for normal domestic service. The screws were designed for ease of replacement and could be changed without removing the cutter from the water. A clutch-in idle speed of three knots helped to conserve fuel on lengthy patrols and an eighteen knot maximum speed could get the cutter on scene quickly. Air-conditioned interior spaces were a part of the original design for the Point class cutter. Interior access to the deckhouse was through a watertight door on the starboard side aft of the deckhouse. The deckhouse contained the cabin for the officer-in-charge and the executive petty officer. The deckhouse also included a small arms locker, scuttlebutt, a small desk and head. Access to the lower deck and engine room was down a ladder. At the bottom of the ladder was the galley, mess and recreation deck. A watertight door at the front of the mess bulkhead led to the main crew quarters which was ten feet long and included six bunks that could be stowed, three bunks on each side. Forward of the bunks was the crew's head complete with a compact sink, shower and commode.

== History ==
After delivery in 1960, Point Hope was assigned a homeport of Sabine Pass, Texas, where she served as a law enforcement and search and rescue patrol boat. On 26 February 1968 she towed the disabled FV Hope 60 miles to Sabine Pass. On 6 October 1968 Point Hope towed the disabled FV Miss Cubit 30 miles to Galveston, Texas. On 11 March 1969 she extinguished a fire on tug Gulf Master and towed her to the Port of Sabine. She fought another fire on a gas drilling rig in the Gulf of Mexico on 30 September 1971. Point Hope rescued seven personnel from a capsized jack-up barge on 17 October 1984. In May 1987 she transported endangered loggerhead turtles to deep water.

On 3 May 1991 Point Hope was transferred to the government of Costa Rica, being renamed Colonel Alfonso Monje (SP 821).
