= USCGC Point Brown =

United States Coast Guard Auxiliary patrol boat

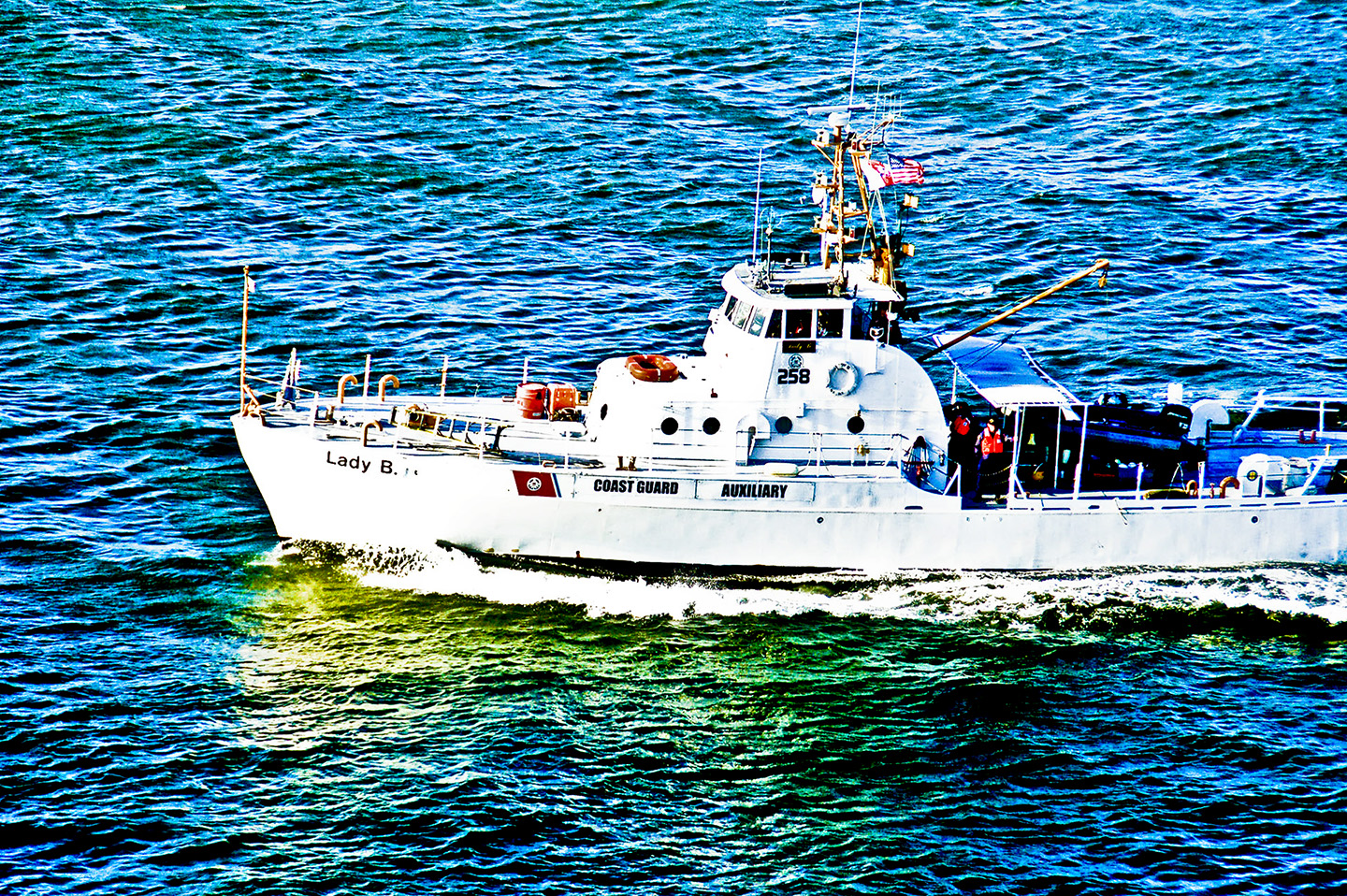
- Former USCGC Point Brown in the service of the Coast Guard Auxiliary as Lady B.

History

United States
- Name: USCGC Point Brown (WPB-82362)
- Namesake: Point Brown near Ocean Shores, Washington
- Builder: J.M. Martinac Shipbuilding Corp.
- Commissioned: 30 March 1967
- Decommissioned: 27 September 1991
- Fate: Donated to Coast Guard Auxiliary as Lady B

General characteristics
- Class & type: Point-class cutter
- Displacement: 60 tons
- Length: 82 ft 10 in (25.25 m)
- Beam: 17 ft 7 in (5.36 m) max
- Draft: 5 ft 11 in (1.80 m)
- Propulsion: 2 × 800 hp (597 kW) Cummins diesel engines; refit in the 1990s with 800 hp Caterpillar diesel engines; 2 × 42 inches (1.1 m) five-bladed propellers
- Speed: 14.45 knots (26.76 km/h; 16.63 mph)
- Range: 590 nmi (1,090 km)
- Complement: 8 men
- Armament: 1967, 1 × Oerlikon 20 mm cannon

USCGC Point Brown (WPB-82362) was an 82-foot (25 m) Point class cutter constructed by J.M. Martinac Shipbuilding Corp. at Tacoma, Washington in 1967 for use as a law enforcement and search and rescue patrol boat.

== Design and construction details ==
Point Brown was built to accommodate an 8-man crew. She was powered by two 800 hp (597 kW) VT800 Cummins diesel main drive engines and had two five-bladed 42 in (1.1 m) propellers. Water tank capacity was 1,550 U.S. gallons (5,900 L) and fuel tank capacity was 1,840 U.S. gallons (7,000 L) at 95% full. After 1990 many in the Point class were refit with 800 hp (597 kW) Caterpillar diesel main drive engines. Engine exhaust was ported through the transom rather than through a conventional stack and this permitted a 360-degree view from the bridge; a feature that was very useful in search and rescue work as well as a combat environment.

The design specifications for Point Brown included a steel hull for durability and an aluminum superstructure and longitudinally framed construction was used to save weight. Ease of operation with a small crew size was possible because of the non-manned main drive engine spaces. Controls and alarms located on the bridge allowed one man operation of the cutter thus eliminating a live engineer watch in the engine room. Because of design, four men could operate the cutter; however, the need for resting watchstanders brought the crew size to eight men for normal domestic service. The screws were designed for ease of replacement and could be changed without removing the cutter from the water. A clutch-in idle speed of three knots helped to conserve fuel on lengthy patrols and an eighteen knot maximum speed could get the cutter on scene quickly. Air-conditioned interior spaces were a part of the original design for the Point class cutter. Interior access to the deckhouse was through a watertight door on the starboard side aft of the deckhouse. The deckhouse contained the cabin for the officer-in-charge and the executive petty officer. The deckhouse also included a small arms locker, scuttlebutt, a small desk and head. Access to the lower deck and engine room was down a ladder. At the bottom of the ladder was the galley, mess and recreation deck. A watertight door at the front of the mess bulkhead led to the main crew quarters which was ten feet long and included six bunks that could be stowed, three bunks on each side. Forward of the bunks was the crew's head complete with a compact sink, shower and commode.

== History ==
Point Brown was homeported at Little Creek, Virginia from 1967 to 1981 where she was used for law enforcement and search and rescue operations. On 7 January 1968, she escorted distressed FV Avalon to Hampton Roads, Virginia On 14 March 1969, she provided escort following the collision between FV Endeavor and MV African Neptune off the Virginia coast. On 5 March 1970, she towed the disabled FV Our Lady of Fatima 60 miles east of Cape Henry to Hampton, Virginia. On 21 April 1970, she towed the disabled FV Sea Queen to Hampton. On 4 July 1970, she helped fight a fire in an oil-storage tank at Sewell's Point, Virginia. On 7 October 1970, she medevaced a crewman from the Argentine MV Rio Dulce off Cape Henry. On 22 November 1970, she towed the pleasure craft Nita Bee to Little Creek, Virginia. On 7 January 1979, she towed the disabled FV Faith to Hampton, VA. On 23 February 1979, she assisted FVs Triton 7 and Margery Snow that were aground on Little Cobb Island, Virginia.

From September 1981 to late 1988, she was stationed at Oregon Inlet, North Carolina. On 23 July 1980, she towed a disabled naval skiff. On 24 April 1984, she seized the pleasure craft Sport Fishing northwest of the Windward Passage with 5,000 lb (2,300 kg) of marijuana on board.

From late 1988 to 1991, she was stationed at Atlantic Beach, North Carolina.

After a refit she was recommissioned as the Lady B, and served as a vessel in the Coast Guard Auxiliary in New York City.
