= USCGC Point Hannon =

History

United States
- Name: USCGC Point Hannon (WPB-82355)
- Owner: United States Coast Guard
- Builder: J.M. Martinac Shipbuilding Corp., Tacoma, Washington
- Commissioned: 23 Jan 1967
- Decommissioned: 11 Jan 2001
- Home port: West Jonesport, Maine 67-01
- Fate: Transferred to Panama

General characteristics
- Type: Patrol boat (WPB)
- Displacement: 60 tons
- Length: 82 ft 10 in (25.25 m)
- Beam: 17 ft 7 in (5.36 m) max
- Draft: 5 ft 11 in (1.80 m)
- Speed: 22.9 knots (42.4 km/h; 26.4 mph)
- Complement: 2 senior enlisted; 8 junior enlisted

USCGC Point Hannon (WPB-82355) was an 82-foot (25 m) Point class cutter constructed in 1967 for use as a law enforcement and search and rescue patrol boat.

== Design and construction details ==
Point Hannon was built to accommodate an 8-man crew. She was powered by two 600 hp (447 kW) VT600 Cummins diesel main drive engines and had two five-bladed 42 in (1.1 m) propellers. The main drive engines were later replaced by 800 hp (597 kW) VT800 Cummins engines. Water tank capacity was 1,550 U.S. gallons (5,900 L) and fuel capacity was 1,840 U.S. gallons (7,000 L) at 95% full. Point-class cutters in service after 1990 were re-powered with Caterpillar main drive engines. Engine exhaust was ported through the transom rather than through a conventional stack permitting a 360 degree view from the bridge a useful feature in search and rescue work.

She had a steel hull, an aluminum superstructure with a longitudinally framed construction to save weight. Controls were located on the bridge which allowed one-man operation and eliminated an engineer watch in the engine room. For short periods, a crew of four men could operate the cutter, however, the need for rest brought the practical crew to eight for normal service. The screws were designed for ease of replacement and could be changed without removing the cutter from the water. A clutch-in idle speed of three knots helped to conserve fuel on lengthy patrols and she had an eighteen knot maximum speed.

Interior access was through a watertight door on the starboard side aft of the deckhouse, which contained the cabin for the officer-in-charge and the executive officer, a small arms locker, scuttlebutt, desk and head. Access to the lower deck and engine room was via a ladder, at the bottom of which was the galley, mess and recreation deck. A watertight door at the front of the mess bulkhead led to the crew quarters which was ten feet long with six stowable bunks, three on each side. Forward of the bunks was the crew's head with sink, shower and commode, interior spaces were air-conditioned.

== History ==
Point Hannon was stationed at West Jonesport, Maine from 1967 to January 2001. She was used for law enforcement and search and rescue operations. On 12 July 1967, while towing F/V Stanley Butler, the tow was hit by F/V Hope II in Great Round Shoals Canal. The cutter commenced a tandem tow until relieved by cutter Cape Horn. On 22 October 1967, she helped fight fire on the Indian M/V Vishva Mangal near Searsport, Maine. On 13 December 1978, she seized the Panamanian tug Tuskewr, which was attempting to smuggle hashish worth about $1 million into the U.S. On 15 January 1984, she rescued a man clinging to a buoy 12 miles off Rockland, Maine.

Point Hannon was transferred to the Naval Force of Panama in 2001 and renamed P-209 5 de Noviembre Since then the ship has played in various missions along the territorial waters of the Republic of Panama as part of the naval fleet, under the aegis of the National Directorate of Operations, Naval Group. Panama has 5 ships of this type.
