= USCGC Point Judith =

United States Coast Guard cutter

History

United States
- Name: USCGC Point Judith (WPB-82345)
- Namesake: Point Judith, Narragansett, Rhode Island
- Owner: United States Coast Guard
- Builder: J.M. Martinac Shipbuilding Corp.
- Commissioned: 26 July 1966
- Decommissioned: 15 January 1992
- Fate: Transferred to Venezuela as Alcatraz (PG-32)

General characteristics
- Type: Patrol Boat (WPB)
- Displacement: 60 tons
- Length: 82 ft 10 in (25.25 m)
- Beam: 17 ft 7 in (5.36 m) max
- Draft: 5 ft 11 in (1.80 m)
- Propulsion: 1962 • 2 × 800 hp (597 kW) Cummins diesel engines; 1990 • 2 × 800 hp (597 kW) Caterpillar diesel engines
- Speed: 22.9 knots (42.4 km/h; 26.4 mph)
- Range: 542 nmi (1,004 km) at 18 kn (33 km/h; 21 mph); 1,500 nmi (2,800 km) at 9.4 kn (17.4 km/h; 10.8 mph)
- Complement: Domestic service : 8 men
- Armament: 1966 • 1 × Oerlikon 20 mm cannon

USCGC Point Judith (WPB-82345) was an 82-foot (25 m) Point class cutter constructed at the J.M. Martinac Shipbuilding Corp. yards at Tacoma, Washington in 1966 for use as a law enforcement and search and rescue patrol boat.

== Construction and design details ==
Point Judith was built to accommodate an 8-man crew. She was powered by two 800 hp (597 kW) VT800 Cummins diesel main drive engines and had two five-bladed 42 in (1.1 m) propellers. Water tank capacity was 1,550 U.S. gallons (5,900 L) and fuel tank capacity was 1,840 U.S. gallons (7,000 L) at 95% full. After 1990 she was refit with 800 hp (597 kW) Caterpillar diesel main drive engines. Engine exhaust was ported through the transom rather than through a conventional stack and this permitted a 360-degree view from the bridge; a feature that was very useful in search and rescue work as well as a combat environment.

The design specifications for Point Judith included a steel hull for durability and an aluminum superstructure and longitudinally framed construction was used to save weight. Ease of operation with a small crew size was possible because of the non-manned main drive engine spaces. Controls and alarms located on the bridge allowed one man operation of the cutter thus eliminating a live engineer watch in the engine room. Because of design, four men could operate the cutter; however, the need for resting watchstanders brought the crew size to eight men for normal domestic service. The screws were designed for ease of replacement and could be changed without removing the cutter from the water. A clutch-in idle speed of three knots helped to conserve fuel on lengthy patrols and an eighteen knot maximum speed could get the cutter on scene quickly. Air-conditioned interior spaces were a part of the original design for the Point class cutter. Interior access to the deckhouse was through a watertight door on the starboard side aft of the deckhouse. The deckhouse contained the cabin for the officer-in-charge and the executive petty officer. The deckhouse also included a small arms locker, scuttlebutt, a small desk and head. Access to the lower deck and engine room was down a ladder. At the bottom of the ladder was the galley, mess and recreation deck. A watertight door at the front of the mess bulkhead led to the main crew quarters which was ten feet long and included six bunks that could be stowed, three bunks on each side. Forward of the bunks was the crew's head complete with a compact sink, shower and commode.

== History ==
After commissioning, Point Judith was stationed at San Pedro, California, from 1966 to 1972 where she was used for law enforcement and search and rescue operations. On 8 March 1970 she fought fire and rescued the operator of the FV Mikki Sue off Long Beach, California. On 13 July she towed the disabled USCGC Point Barrow to San Pedro.

In 1973 Point Judith was transferred to Santa Barbara, California where she was used for search and rescue as well as some aids to navigation work. On 15 June 1983, she helped the United States Customs Service seize the Greenpeace MV Pacific Peacemaker, which was attempting to disrupt a test of the MX Missile off Vandenberg Air Force Base. On 22 November 1984 she seized the yacht Mir 5.5 mi (8.9 km) off Santa Rosa Island with 14,000 lb (6,400 kg) of marijuana on board. On 21 September 1987 Point Judith assisted following a collision between MVs Pacharoness and Atlantic Wing 15 mi (24 km) southwest of Point Conception.

Point Judith was decommissioned 15 January 1992 and transferred to Venezuela. She currently serves as Alcatraz (PG-32).
