= Point-class cutter =

Class of patrol boats

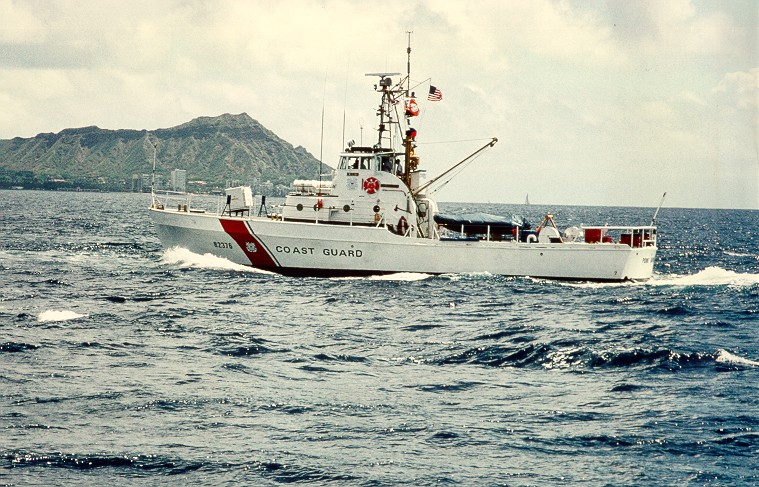

Class overview
- Builders: Coast Guard Yard 1960–1963, 1970; J.M. Martinac Shipbuilding Corp. 1966–1967
- Operators: United States Coast Guard; Panama; Philippines
- Preceded by: Cape class
- Succeeded by: Marine Protector class
- Built: 1960–1970
- In commission: 1960–2003
- Completed: 79
- Retired: 79

General characteristics (1960)
- Type: Patrol boat (WPB)
- Displacement: 60–69 tons
- Length: 82 ft 10 in (25.25 m)
- Beam: 17 ft 7 in (5.36 m) max
- Draft: 5 ft 11 in (1.80 m)
- Propulsion: Originally (2) 600 hp (450 kW) Cummins diesel, thru hull number 82330 ex. hulls 82314, 82318; (2) 800 hp (600 kW) Cummins diesel, hulls 82331 and up and hull 82318; (2) 1,000 hp (750 kW) gas turbine, hull 82314
- Speed: 16.8 kn (31.1 km/h; 19.3 mph) (1960)
- Range: 577 miles at maximum sustained speed of 14.5 knots; 1271 miles at 10.7 knots economic speed (1960)
- Complement: domestic service, 1 officer and 9 enlisted; Vietnam service, 2 officers, 8 enlisted
- Armament: 1960; 1 × Oerlikon 20 mm cannon; Vietnam service; 5 × M2 Browning machine guns; 1 × 81 mm M29 mortar

The Point-class cutter was a class of 82-foot patrol vessels designed to replace the United States Coast Guard's aging 83-foot wooden hull patrol boat being used at the time. The boats had a mild steel hull and an aluminum superstructure. The Coast Guard Yard discontinued building the 95-foot Cape-class cutter to have the capacity to produce the 82-foot Point-class patrol boat in 1960. They served as patrol vessels used in law enforcement and search and rescue along the coasts of the United States and the Caribbean. They also served in Vietnam during the Vietnam War. They were replaced by the 87-foot Marine Protector-class patrol boats beginning in the late 1990s.

== Naming the class ==
Following the Coast Guard custom in place in 1960 of not naming vessels under 100 feet in length, the first 44 Point-class patrol boats were only identified by their hull number using the scheme of WPB-823xx, where 82 was the design length of the hull. Beginning in January 1964, the Coast Guard started naming all vessels 65 feet in length and over. The 82-foot patrol boats were all given geographical "Point" names.

== Design and production ==
The design of the 82-foot patrol boat actually began in the early 1950s with the introduction of the 95-foot patrol boat, which was introduced to replace the aging wooden gasoline-powered 83-foot patrol boats produced during World War II. The 95-foot patrol boat was originally developed as a search and rescue boat to replace the less capable 83-foot boat. With the outbreak of the Korean War and the requirement by the Coast Guard to secure port facilities in the United States under the Moss-Magnuson Act, the complete replacement of the 83-foot boat was deferred and the 95-foot boat was used for harbor patrols.

With the goal of reducing manning requirements, the Point-class patrol boat was designed to accommodate an eight-man crew, a reduction from the 15-man crews of the Cape-class cutter. Production started in early 1960 at the Coast Guard Yard at Curtis Bay, Maryland and continued through late December 1963, producing 44 boats. The first 30 boats were powered by two 600 horsepower (450 kW) Cummins diesel engines, except for 82314 (later Point Thatcher), which was powered by two 1,000 horsepower (750 kW) gas turbine engines with controllable pitch propellers and 82318 (later Point Herron) which had two 800 horsepower (600 kW) Cummins diesels installed. Beginning in March 1962 with 82331 (later Point Marone), all boats were equipped with two 800-horsepower Cummins diesel engines. All were equipped with twin propellers. Eventually all boats were upgraded to the same 800-horsepower main engines used in the later production.

In 1966 a contract for the production of 25 additional boats was awarded to J.M. Martinac Shipbuilding Corp. of Tacoma, Washington. All 25 were equipped with the twin 800-horsepower engines of the 1962 and later Yard production. In 1970, the last nine boats of the class were produced at the Yard utilizing the 800-horsepower design of the remainder of the class. Those boats in service in 1990 were refit with Caterpillar diesel main drive engines. Engine exhaust was ported through the transom rather than through a conventional stack permitting a 360-degree view from the bridge, a useful feature in search and rescue work.

The design specifications for the 82-foot cutter included a steel hull, an aluminum superstructure with a longitudinally framed construction to save weight. Controls were located on the bridge which allowed one-man operation and eliminated an engineer watch in the engine room. For short periods, a crew of four men could operate the cutter, however, the need for rest brought the practical crew to eight for normal service. Berthing spaces were provided for 13 so that requirements were met for passengers and extra wartime manning needs.

The screws were designed for ease of replacement and could be changed without removing the cutter from the water. A clutch-in idle speed of three knots helped to conserve fuel on lengthy patrols and she had an eighteen knot maximum speed. Already part of the design, crews stationed in Vietnam found the air-conditioned interior especially helpful. Interior access to the deckhouse was through a watertight door on the starboard side aft of the deckhouse. The deckhouse contained the cabin for the officer-in-charge and the executive petty officer but for Vietnam service the spaces quartered the commanding officer, the executive officer and chief boatswain's mate as well as the chief engineman. The deckhouse also included a small arms locker, scuttlebutt, desk and head. Access to the lower deck and engine room was via a ladder, at the bottom of which was the galley, mess and recreation deck. A watertight door at the front of the mess bulkhead led to the crew quarters which was ten feet long with six stowable bunks, three on each side. Forward of the bunks was the crew's head with sink, shower and commode, interior spaces were air-conditioned. Accommodation for a 13-man crew were installed for Vietnam War service.

== History ==
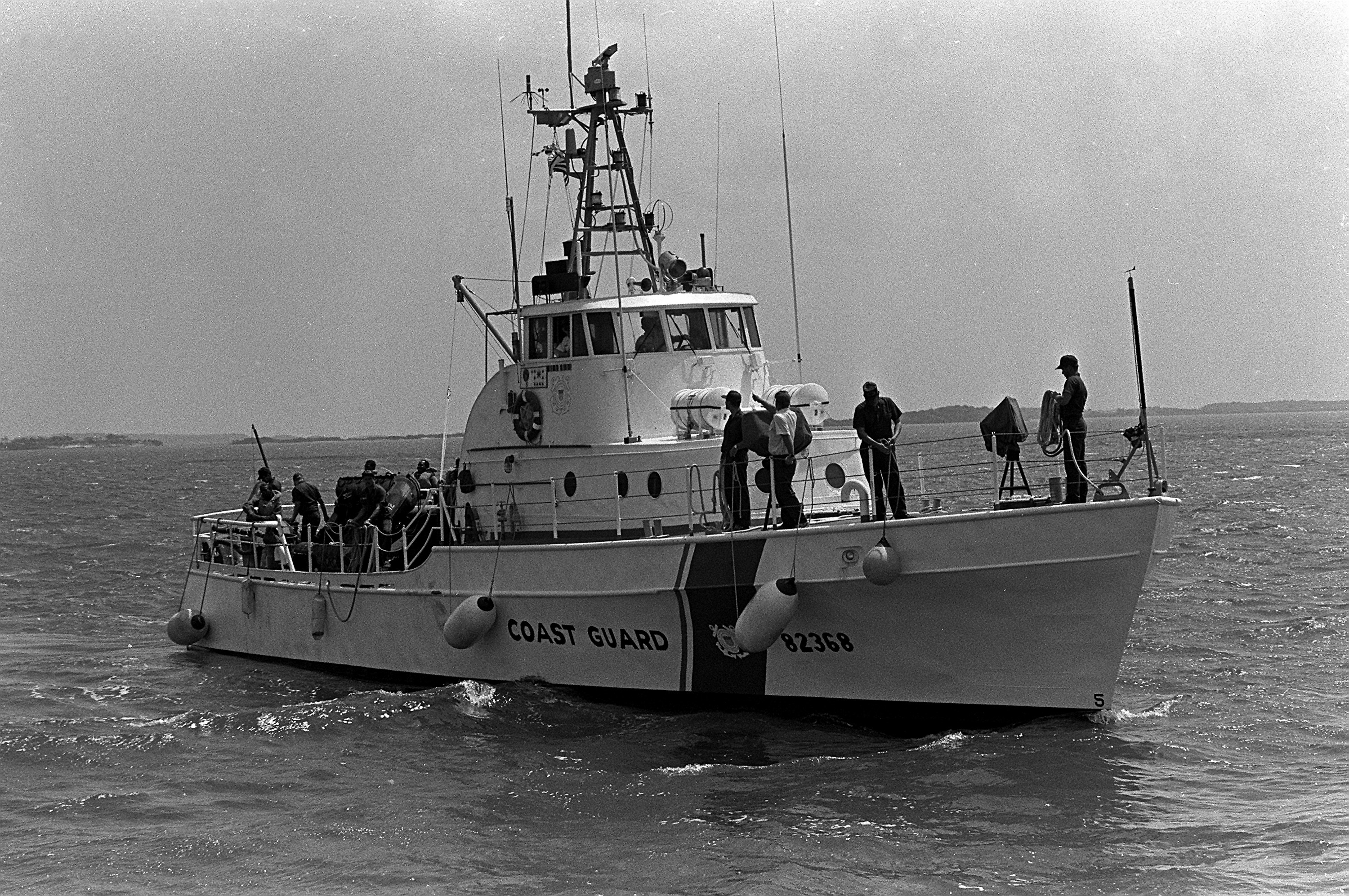
U.S. Coast Guard patrol boat Point Warde (WPB-82368) off the coast during Upward Key '87, a joint exercise of U.S. and Antigua and Barbuda Defense Forces

=== Domestic service ===
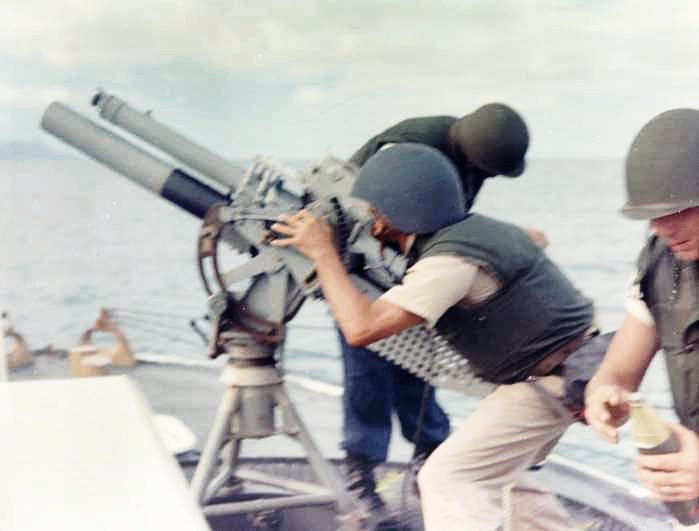
Gun crew on board USCGC Point Comfort (WPB-82317) firing 81mm mortar during bombardment of suspected Viet Cong staging area one mile behind An Thoi, August 1965

A total of 79 Point-class cutters were used for law enforcement and search-and-rescue patrol boats beginning in 1960. The cutters were mostly co-located with Coast Guard stations along the Atlantic, Pacific and Gulf coasts. Point-class cutters were phased out in the late 1990s by the introduction of the Marine Protector-class coastal patrol boat with the last Point-class cutter being decommissioned in 2003.

=== Vietnam service ===
At the request of the U.S. Navy, 26 of the Point-class cutters were transported to Vietnam to serve with Coast Guard crews under U.S. Navy control during Operation Market Time. Coast Guard Squadron One was commissioned at Alameda, California on 27 May 1965. Crews immediately began training and preparation for overseas deployment. All USCG Point-class cutters in Vietnam were later turned over to the South Vietnamese Navy as part of the Vietnamization of the war effort.

When North Vietnam overtook the South the then-South Vietnamese Navy cutters had varied fates. Some were captured and incorporated into the Vietnam People's Navy. A few South Vietnamese boats were scuttled, and some by fleeing South Vietnamese military and civilians to successfully escape to the Philippines. The boats that sailed to the Philippines were pressed into service by the Philippine Navy, boats decommissioned in the 1980s, at which time the boats sold for scrap or to the private market.

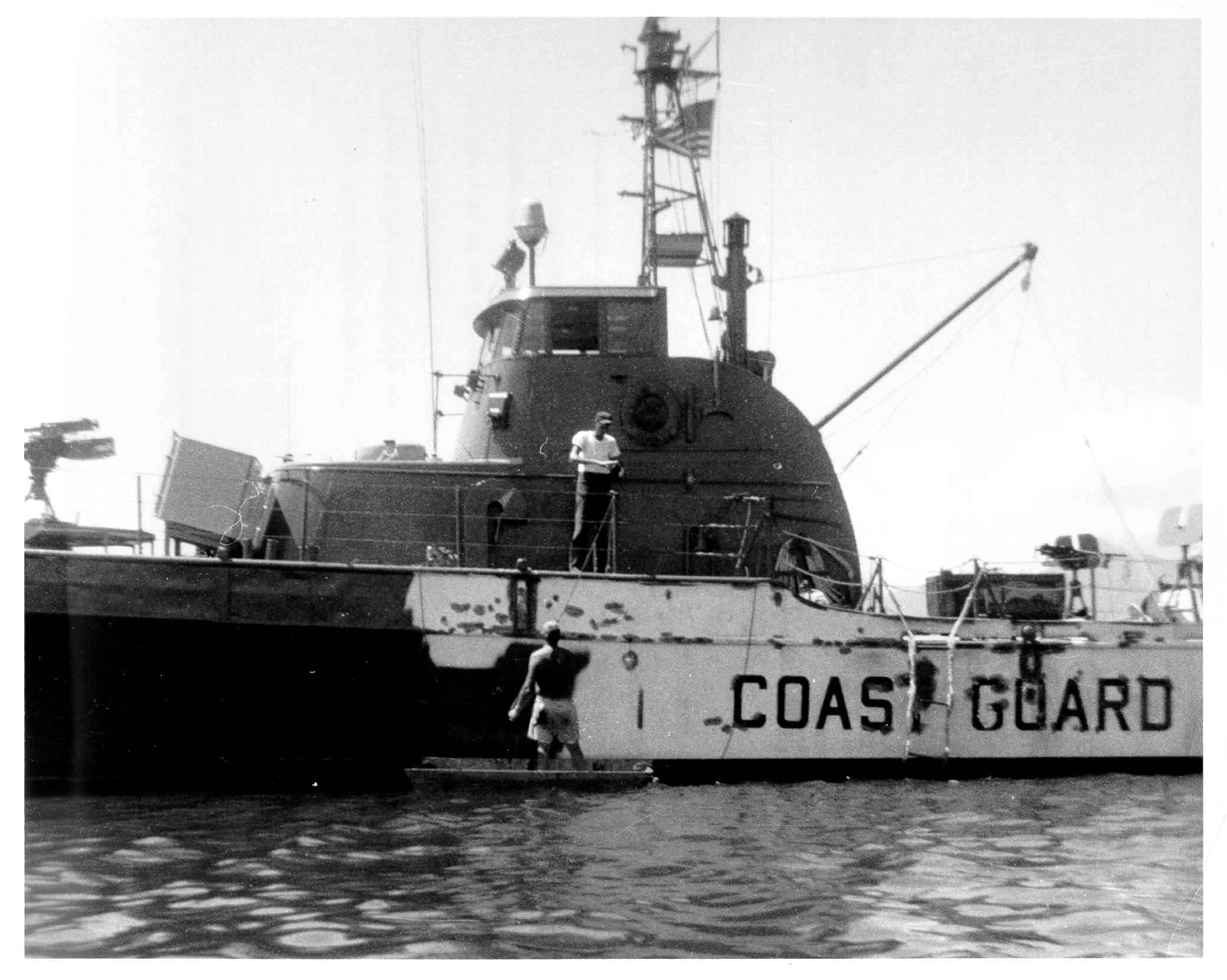
Point Gammon gets a camouflage coat of dark grey paint at Da Nang, October 1965, for its conversion from Coast Guard use to Vietnam War river patrol duties.

== Replacement ==
When planning the replacement for the Point-class cutter, designers took into consideration the need for different berthing arrangements that would accommodate a mixed-gender crew. Another important feature lacking on the Point-class cutter that was desired on a replacement was a stern launch ramp for the rapid deployment of the cutter's small boat for use in search-and-rescue missions and in law-enforcement work. Both of these requirements were designed into the Marine Protector-class that began replacing the Point-class cutters during the late 1990s. The last Point-class cutter was replaced in 2003.

== Commissioning, homeport, and disposition information ==
Legend: Denotes Vietnam service Denotes construction by J.M. Martinac Shipbuilding Corp.

Name	Hull number	Commissioned	Decommissioned	Homeport	Disposition
Point Caution	WPB-82301	5 October 1960	29 April 1970	Galveston, Texas 61-65; Division 12, RVN 65-70	Transfer to RVN as RVNS Nguyễn An (HQ-716) 29 April 1970
Point Hope	WPB-82302	5 October 1960	3 May 1991	Sabine Pass, Texas 61-91	Transfer to Costa Rica 3 May 1991
Point Young	WPB-82303	26 October 1960	16 March 1970	Grand Isle, Louisiana 61-65; Division 11, RVN 65-70	Transfer to RVN as RVNS Trần Lo (HQ-714) 16 March 1970
Point League	WPB-82304	9 November 1960	16 May 1969	Morgan City, Louisiana 61-65; Division 13, RVN 65-69	Transfer to RVN as RVNS Lê Phước Đức (HQ-700) 16 May 1969
Point Partridge	WPB-82305	23 November 1960	27 May 1970	Beals and West Jonesport, Maine 61-65; Division 13, RVN 66-70	Transfer to RVN as RVNS Bùi Viết Thành (HQ-715) 27 May 1970
Point Jefferson	WPB-82306	7 December 1960	21 February 1970	Nantucket, Massachusetts 61-65; Division 13, RVN 65-70	Transfer to RVN as RVNS Lê Ngọc Ẩn (HQ-712) 21 February 1970
Point Glover	WPB-82307	7 December 1960	14 February 1970	Fort Hancock, New Jersey 61-65; Division 11, RVN 65-70	Transfer to RVN as RVNS Đào Văn Đặng (HQ-711) 14 February 1970
Point White	WPB-82308	18 February 1961	12 January 1970	New London, Connecticut 61-65; Division 13, RVN 66-70	Transfer to RVN as RVNS Lê Đình Hùng (HQ-708) 12 January 1970
Point Arden	WPB-82309	1 February 1961	14 February 1970	Pt. Pleasant, New Jersey 61-65; Division 12, RVN 65-70	Transfer to RVN as RVNS Phạm Ngọc Châu (HQ-710) 14 February 1970
Point Garnet	WPB-82310	15 March 1961	16 May 1969	Norfolk, Virginia 61-65; Division 11, RVN 65-69	Transfer to RVN as RVNS Lê Văn Ngà (HQ-701) 16 May 1969
Point Verde	WPB-82311	15 March 1961	12 May 1991	Venice, Louisiana 61-68; Dauphin Island, Louisiana 69-79; Pensacola, Florida 80-91	Transfer to Mexico 12 June 1991
Point Swift	WPB-82312	22 March 1961	30 March 1995	St. Petersburg, Florida 61-68; Clearwater Beach, Florida 69-91	Stored at CG Yard at least through Jun 1997. Sunk as an artificial reef near Cape May, New Jersey, 30 March 2000
Point Slocum	WPB-82313	12 April 1961	11 December 1969	St. Thomas, VI 61-65; Division 13, RVN 66-69	Transfer to RVN as RVNS Nguyễn Ngọc Thạch (HQ-706) 11 December 1969
Point Thatcher	WPB-82314	13 September 1961	13 May 1992	Miami Beach, Florida 61-63, 66-71; Norfolk, Virginia 64-65; Sarasota, Florida 71-84; Nokomis, Florida 85-92	Sunk as artificial reef
Point Clear	WPB-82315	26 April 1961	15 September 1969	San Pedro, California 61-65; Division 11, RVN 65-69	Transfer to RVN as RVNS Huỳnh Văn Đức (HQ-702) 15 September 1969
Point Mast	WPB-82316	10 May 1961	15 June 1970	Long Beach, California 61-65; Division 11, RVN 65-70	Transfer to RVN as Ho Dang La 15 June 1970 (Note: The Coast Guard Historian's Office cites Point Mast being recommissioned Ho Dang La and no hull number. Scotti cites Dam Thoai and a hull number of HQ-721.)
Point Comfort	WPB-82317	24 May 1961	17 November 1969	Benicia, California 61-65; Division 11, RVN 65-69	Transfer to RVN as RVNS Đào Thức (HQ-704) 17 November 1969
Point Herron	WPB-82318	14 June 1961	27 July 1991	Lewes, Delaware 61-64; Cape May, New Jersey 65; Bay Shore, New Jersey 66-81; Babylon, New York 82-91	Transfer to Mexico 27 July 1991
Point Orient	WPB-82319	28 June 1961	14 July 1970	Ft. Pierce, Florida 61-65; Division 12, RVN 65-70	Transfer to RVN as RVNS Nguyễn Kim Hưng (HQ-722) 14 July 1970
Point Kennedy	WPB-82320	19 July 1961	16 March 1970	San Juan, PR 61-65; Division 13, RVN 66-70	Transfer to RVN as RVNS Huỳnh Văn Ngan (HQ-713) 16 March 1970
Point Lomas	WPB-82321	9 August 1961	23 May 1970	Port Aransas, Texas 61-65; Division 12, RVN 65-70	Transfer to RVN as HQ-718 23 May 1970 (Note: The Coast Guard Historian's Office cites Point Lomas being recommissioned with only a hull number of HQ-718. Scotti cites Van Dien and a hull number of HQ-719.)
Point Hudson	WPB-82322	30 August 1961	11 December 1969	Panama City, Florida 61-65; Division 13, RVN 65-69	Transfer to RVN as RVNS Đặng Văn Hoành (HQ-707) 11 December 1969
Point Grace	WPB-82323	27 September 1961	15 June 1970	Crisfield, Maryland 61-65; Division 13, RVN 66-70	Transfer to RVN as Dam Thoai 15 June 1970 (Note: The Coast Guard Historian's Office cites Point Grace being recommissioned Dam Thoai and no hull number. Scotti cites Ho Dang La and a hull number of HQ-720.)
Point Grey	WPB-82324	11 October 1961	14 July 1970	Norfolk, Virginia 61-65; Division 11, RVN 65-70	Transfer to RVN as RVNS Huỳnh Bộ (HQ-723) 14 July 1970
Point Dume	WPB-82325	1 November 1961	14 February 1970	Fire Island, New York 61-65; Division 12, RVN 65-70	Transfer to RVN as RVNS Trường Tiền (HQ-709) 14 February 1970
Point Cypress	WPB-82326	22 November 1961	15 August 1970	Boston, Massachusetts 61-65; Division 13, RVN 66-70	Transfer to RVN as RVNS Hồ Duy (HQ-724) 15 August 1970 (Note: Larzelere cites 15 August 1970 as decommissioning date of Point Cypress while the Coast Guard Historian's Office and Scheina cite a decommissioning date of 11 November 1969. Larzelere cites picture of event on page 239 and an extract of the August 1970 monthly historical summary of Commander, Naval Forces Vietnam on page 240 as his source.)
Point Banks	WPB-82327	13 December 1961	26 March 1970	Woods Hole, Massachusetts 61-65; Division 13, RVN 66-70	Transfer to RVN as HQ-719 26 March 1970 (Note: The Coast Guard Historian's Office cites Point Banks being recommissioned with only a hull number of HQ-719. Scotti cites Ngo Van Quyen and a hull number of HQ-718.)
Point Gammon	WPB-82328	31 January 1962	11 November 1969	Ft. Bragg, California 62-65; Division 12, RVN 65-69	Transfer to RVN as RVNS Nguyễn Đao (HQ-703) 11 November 1969
Point Welcome	WPB-82329	14 February 1962	29 April 1970	Everett, Washington 62-65; Division 12, RVN 65-70	Transfer to RVN as RVNS Nguyễn Hấn (HQ-717) 29 April 1970
Point Ellis	WPB-82330	28 February 1962	9 December 1969	Port Townsend, Washington 62-65; Division 12, RVN 65-69	Transfer to RVN as RVNS Lê Ngọc Thanh (HQ-705) 9 December 1969
Point Marone	WPB-82331	14 March 1962	15 August 1970	San Pedro, California 62-65; Division 11, RVN 65-70	Transfer to RVN as RVNS Trương Ba (HQ-725) 15 August 1970
Point Roberts	WPB-82332	6 June 1962	1 February 1992	Mayport, Florida 62-92	Transfer to EPA as Lake Explorer Duluth, Minnesota
Point Highland	WPB-82333	27 June 1962	24 February 2001	Little Creek, Virginia 62-65; Crisfield, Maryland 65-81; Chincoteague, Maryland 81-97; Cape May, New Jersey 97-01	Transfer to Trinidad & Tobago as Bacolet Point 30 September 1
Point Ledge	WPB-82334	18 July 1962	3 August 1998	Ft. Bragg, California 62-94; St. Thomas, VI 94-96; Mobile, Alabama 96-98	Transfer to Venezuela 30 August 1998
Point Countess	WPB-82335	8 August 1962	25 May 2000	Bellingham, Washington 62-65; Everett, Washington 66-67; Port Angeles, Washington 68-88; Nokomis Beach, Florida 88-00	Transfer to Republic of Georgia 29 June 2000
Point Glass	WPB-82336	29 August 1962	3 April 2000	Tacoma, Washington 62-70; Gig Harbor, Washington 71-89; Ft. Lauderdale, Florida 90-00	Transfer to NOAA 3 April 2000
Point Divide	WPB-82337	19 September 1962	31 March 1995	Newport Beach, California 62-65; Corona del Mar, California 66-95	Donated to Seattle Maritime Academy renamed Maritime Instructor.
Point Bridge	WPB-82338	10 October 1962	19 September 2001	San Pedro, California 62-64; Venice, California 65-78; Marina del Rey, California 79-01	Transfer to Costa Rica
Point Chico	WPB-82339	29 October 1962	24 June 2001	Sausalito, California 63-65; Benicia, California 66-74; Yerba Buena Island, California 74-80; Bodega Bay, California 80-01	Transfer to Costa Rica
Point Batan	WPB-82340	22 November 1962	22 September 1999	Fort Hancock, New Jersey 62-65; Pt. Pleasant, New Jersey 66-84; Cape May, New Jersey 85-99	Transfer to Dominican Republic 22 September 1999
Point Lookout	WPB-82341	12 December 1962	24 March 1994	Pascagoula, Mississippi 62-64; Morgan City, Louisiana 65-94	Sunk as artificial reef at Ocean City, Maryland 4 April 1997
Point Baker	WPB-82342	30 October 1963	6 February 2002	Port Isabel, Texas 63-65; Port Aransas, Texas 66-91, Sabine Pass, Texas 92-02	Transfer to Republic of Georgia
Point Wells	WPB-82343	20 November 1963	13 October 2000	Montauk, New York 64-00	Transfer to Colombia
Point Estero	WPB-82344	11 December 1963	6 February 2001	Gulfport, Mississippi 63-01	Transfer to Colombia
Point Judith	WPB-82345	26 July 1966	15 January 1992	San Pedro, California 66-72; Santa Barbara, California 73-92	Transfer to Venezuela as Alcatraz (PG-32) 15 January 1992
Point Arena	WPB-82346	26 August 1966	30 March 1995	Little Creek, Virginia 66-95	Stored at CG Yard at least through Jun 1997
Point Bonita	WPB-82347	12 September 1966	14 November 2000	Nantucket, Massachusetts 66-71; Woods Hole, Massachusetts 72-88; South Portland, Maine 88-00	Transfer to Trinidad & Tobago 14 November 2000
Point Barrow	WPB-82348	4 October 1966	7 June 1991	San Francisco, California 66-80; Monterey, California 81-91	Transfer to Panama as Tres de Noviembre (P-204) 7 June 1991. In 2004 the name was changed to "TF CARLOS JACOME" in honor of Lieutenant Carlos Jacome Rodriguez, who suffered a fatal car accident five years after his graduation from the Venezuela Naval Academy.
Point Spencer	WPB-82349	20 October 1966	12 December 2000	New Orleans, Louisiana 67-85; Galveston. TX 85-00	Transfer to Dominican Republic 12 December 2000
Point Franklin	WPB-82350	14 November 1966	23 June 1998	Cape May, New Jersey 66-98	Transfer to Venezuela as Pelicano (PG-34) 3 August 1998
Point Bennett	WPB-82351	19 December 1966	12 February 1999	Port Townsend, Washington 67-99	Transfer to Trinidad and Tobago 12 February 1999
Point Sal	WPB-82352	5 December 1966	29 May 2001	Grand Isle, Louisiana 67-01	Transfer to Colombia 29 May 2001
Point Monroe	WPB-82353	27 December 1966	21 August 2001	Galveston, Texas 67-68; Freeport, Texas 69-01	Transfer to NOAA
Point Evans	WPB-82354	10 January 1967	1 December 1999	Long Beach, California 67-92; Kauai, HI 92-99	Transfer to Philippines
Point Hannon	WPB-82355	23 January 1967	11 January 2001	West Jonesport, Maine 67-01	Transfer to Panama
Point Francis	WPB-82356	2 February 1967	5 March 1999	Fort Hancock, New Jersey 67-76; Highlands, New Jersey 76-99	Transfer to Panama as 10 de Noviembre (P-207) 21 April 1999
Point Huron	WPB-82357	17 February 1967	12 April 1999	Norfolk, Virginia 67-99	Transfer to Panama as 28 de Noviembre (P-206)
Point Stuart	WPB-82358	17 March 1967	27 April 2001	Long Beach, California 67-95; Newport Beach, California 95-01	Transfer to El Salvador
Point Steele ex-Point Buchon	WPB-82359	26 April 1967	9 July 1998	Rockaway, New York 67-70, Oswego, New York 70-80; Key West, Florida 80; Fort Myers Beach, Florida 82-98	Transfer to Antigua-Barbuda as Hermitage (P-03) 17 July 1998
Point Winslow	WPB-82360	3 March 1967	22 September 2000	San Francisco, California 67-80; Eureka, California 81-86; Morro Bay, California 87-94, Morgan City, Louisiana 94-00	Transfer to Panama 22 September 2000
Point Charles	WPB-82361	5 May 1967	13 December 1991	Cape Canaveral, Florida; 67-88; West Palm Beach, Florida 88-91	Transfer to Texas A&M University
Point Brown	WPB-82362	30 March 1967	27 September 1991	Little Creek, Virginia 67-81; Oregon Inlet, North Carolina 81-88; Atlantic Beach, North Carolina 88-91	Donated to Coast Guard Auxiliary as Lady B, New York 30 September 1991
Point Nowell	WPB-82363	13 June 1967	15 October 1999	Port Isabel, Texas 67-99	Transfer to Jamaica as Savanna Point 15 October 1999
Point Whitehorn	WPB-82364	13 July 1967	30 March 1995	St. Thomas, VI 67-95	Scuttled Mar 1997
Point Turner ex-Point Houghton	WPB-82365	14 April 1967	3 April 1998	Newport, Rhode Island 67-98	Transfer to St. Lucia as Alphonse Reynolds (P-05) 15 April 1998
Point Lobos	WPB-82366	29 May 1967	?	Panama City, Florida 67-?	Transfer to NOAA, 2001
Point Knoll	WPB-82367	27 June 1967	11 September 1991	New London, Connecticut 67-91	Transfer to Venezuela as Petrel (PG-31) 20 December 1991
Point Warde	WPB-82368	14 August 1967	29 June 2000	San Juan, PR 67-87; Wrightsville Beach, North Carolina 87-00	Transfer to Colombia 29 June 2000
Point Heyer	WPB-82369	3 August 1967	17 December 1998	San Francisco, California 67-86; Morro Bay, California 87-98	Transfer to Trinidad and Tobago 12 February 1999
Point Richmond	WPB-82370	25 August 1967	30 September 1997	Anacortes, Washington 67-87	Transfer to Ecuador as 23 de Mayo 1997
Point Barnes	WPB-82371	21 April 1970	12 January 2000	Miami Beach, Florida 70-75; Fort Pierce, Florida 75-00	Transfer to Jamaica
Point Brower	WPB-82372	21 April 1970	28 March 2003	San Diego, California 70-89; San Francisco, California 89-	Transfer to Azerbaijan as Marine Brigade Ship S-201
Point Camden	WPB-82373	4 May 1970	15 December 1999	San Pedro, California 70-92; Santa Barbara, California 92-99	Transfer to Costa Rica
Point Carrew	WPB-82374	18 May 1970	22 August 2000	San Pedro, California 70-84; Oxnard, California 85-00	Transfer to Argentina as ARA Río Santiago (P-66)
Point Doran	WPB-82375	1 June 1970	22 March 2000	Everett, Washington 70-00	Transfer to Philippines
Point Harris	WPB-82376	22 June 1970	12 April 1992	Bodega Bay, California 70-77; Guam 78-80; Honolulu, HI 80-90; Nawiliwili, HI 90-92	Sold to private owner
Point Hobart	WPB-82377	13 July 1970	8 July 1999	Oceanside, California 70-99	Transfer to Argentina as ARA Punta Mogotes (P-65)
Point Jackson	WPB-82378	3 August 1970	30 May 2000	Woods Hole, Massachusetts 70-00	Transfer to Turkmenistan as Merjin 30 May 2000
Point Martin	WPB-82379	20 August 1970	6 August 1999	Norfolk, Virginia 70-73; Wrightsville Beach, North Carolina 74-83; Atlantic Beach, North Carolina 83-99	Transfer to Dominican Republic 1 October 1999

== Notes ==
=== References cited ===
- Flynn, James T. "U.S. Coast Guard Small Cutters and Patrol Boats" (PDF). U.S. Coast Guard Historian's Office. pp. 46–42.
- Green, D.L. (March–April 1962). "The 82-foot Class Patrol Boat" (pdf). The Engineer's Digest. U.S. Coast Guard Historian's Office. pp. 2–5.
- Johnson, Robert Irwin (1987). Guardians of the Sea, History of the United States Coast Guard, 1915 to the Present. Naval Institute Press, Annapolis. ISBN 978-0-87021-720-3.
- Larzelere, Alex (1997). The Coast Guard at War, Vietnam, 1965-1975. Naval Institute Press, Annapolis. ISBN 978-1-55750-529-3.
- Scheina, Robert L. (1990). U.S. Coast Guard Cutters & Craft, 1946-1990. Naval Institute Press, Annapolis. ISBN 978-0-87021-719-7.
- Scotti, Paul C. (2000). Coast Guard Action in Vietnam: Stories of Those Who Served. Hellgate Press, Central Point, OR. ISBN 978-1-55571-528-1.
- Wells II, William R. (August 1997). "The United States Coast Guard's Piggyback 81mm Mortar/.50 cal. machine gun". Vietnam Magazine. Archived from the original on 26 November 2025.
