= BRP Abraham Campo =

United States Coast Guard cutter

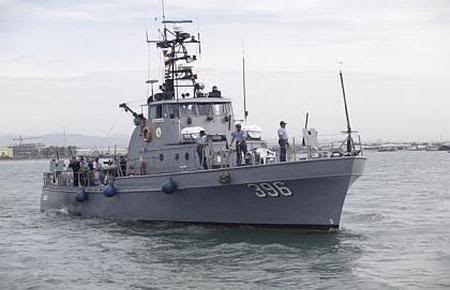
- BRP Abraham Campo

History

United States
- Name: Point Doran
- Namesake: Point Doran
- Builder: Coast Guard Yard
- Commissioned: 1 June 1970
- Decommissioned: 2 March 2001
- Home port: Everett
- Identification: Callsign: NLLX; Hull number: WPB-82375
- Fate: Transferred to Philippines, 2001

Philippines
- Name: Abraham Campo
- Namesake: Abraham Campo
- Acquired: 6 March 2001
- Commissioned: 22 March 2001
- Reclassified: PG-396
- Identification: MMSI number: 548000396; Callsign: DUQW; Pennant number: PC-396
- Status: Active

General characteristics
- Class & type: Point-class cutter
- Displacement: 60 t (59 long tons), light; 69 t (68 long tons), full load
- Length: 82 ft 10 in (25.25 m)
- Beam: 17 ft 7 in (5.36 m) max
- Draft: 5 ft 11 in (1.80 m)
- Installed power: 1,600 hp (1,193 kW)
- Propulsion: 2 × Cummins diesel engines
- Speed: 22.9 knots (42.4 km/h; 26.4 mph)
- Range: 542 mi (872 km) at 18 kn (33 km/h; 21 mph); 1,500 mi (2,400 km) at 9.4 kn (17.4 km/h; 10.8 mph)
- Complement: 8 (1960); 10 (1965); 12 (1990)
- Sensors & processing systems: AN/SPN-11 navigation radar; CR-103 radar (1960); AN/SPS-64 surface-search radar
- Armament: 1 × Oerlikon 20 mm cannon; 5 × M2 Browning machine guns; 1 × M252 mortar

USCGC Point Doran (WPB-82375) was a Point-class cutter built in 1970 and operated by the United States Coast Guard. She was later transferred to the Philippines as BRP Abraham Campo (PC-396). The ship was named after a location in the Chugach Mountains.

== Construction and career ==
Point Doran was built at the Coast Guard Yard, in Baltimore, Maryland in 1970. She was commissioned on 1 June 1970 and was stationed at Everett, Washington. She was used for law enforcement and search and rescue operations primarily in the waters of Puget Sound.

=== Service in the United States Coast Guard ===
During the Vietnam War, she patrolled the Hood Canal to prevent protestors from entering Naval Submarine Base Bangor and Naval Station Bremerton.

On 23 November 1987, at 03:15, Coast Guard Group Seattle received a report that a sailing vessel was on fire south of Cypress Island. Star Fire, a vessel in the vicinity, picked up two people from their life raft as Point Doran put out the fire and dewatered the vessel. She then embarked the two survivors and towed the vessel to Cape Sante Marina, Anacortes.

Point Doran was the lead boat during the Seattle Yacht Club Opening Day Parade, on 4 August 1989. Later on 6 November, a US Navy Grumman A-6 Intruder ditched into the sea off Whidbey Island. Point Doran was dispatched and retrieved parts of the aircraft.

She was decommissioned on 2 March 2001 at Pier 36, and was then donated to the Philippines on the 6th.

=== Service in the Philippine Navy ===
On 22 March 2001, the boat was commissioned as BRP Abraham Campo (PC-396).

In December 2020, she participated in the 85th Anniversary Fleet Review in Morong, Bataan.

On 24 November 2021, the ship conducted a live-firing exercise in the Camotes Sea. The Philippine Navy deployed 19 warships including Abraham Campo for humanitarian aid in Typhoon Odette stricken areas.
