= Floodability =

Floodability may refer to:

- Ship floodability, the susceptibility of a ship's construction to flooding
- the susceptibility of land areas to flooding
