= USCGC Resolute =

US Coast Guard vessel

USCGC Resolute (WMEC-620)
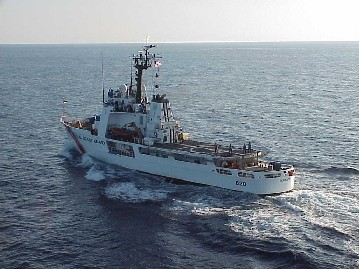
- USCGC Resolute (WMEC-620)

History

United States
- Builder: United States Coast Guard Yard, Curtis Bay, Maryland
- Laid down: May 1965
- Commissioned: 8 December 1966
- Home port: Portsmouth, Virginia
- Identification: MMSI number: 367296000; Callsign: NRLT
- Motto: Fama Extendere Factis; Fame Through Good Deeds
- Status: Active

General characteristics
- Class & type: Reliance-class cutter
- Displacement: 759 tons
- Length: 210 ft 6 in (64.16 m)
- Beam: 34 ft (10 m)
- Draft: 10 ft 6 in (3.20 m) max
- Propulsion: 2 × V16 2,550 hp (1,900 kW) ALCO diesel engines
- Speed: 18 knots (33 km/h; 21 mph)
- Range: 2,700 mi (4,300 km) at 18 knots (33 km/h; 21 mph); 6,100 mi (9,800 km) at 14 knots (26 km/h; 16 mph)
- Complement: 12 officers, 63 enlisted
- Sensors & processing systems: 2 × AN/SPS-78
- Armament: 1 × Mk 38 25mm machine gun; 2 × M2HB .50 caliber machine gun
- Aircraft carried: HH-65 Dolphin

USCGC Resolute (WMEC-620) is a United States Coast Guard medium endurance cutter.

== History ==
The Coast Guard's first cutter Resolute was a top-sail schooner built and commissioned in 1867. This first Resolute was homeported in Key West, Florida, and took on the missions of smuggling interdiction as well as search and rescue.

The current cutter Resolute is very different in size and construction but the missions remain the same. The sixth of sixteen Reliance-class cutters, Resolute was the first of her class to be powered by two 2,500 horsepower (1,900 kW) Alco-B diesel engines. Resolute's keel was laid at the United States Coast Guard Yard, Curtis Bay, Maryland, in May 1965. She was commissioned 8 December 1966. Since that time she has seen several different homeports including San Francisco, California; Alameda, California; Astoria, Oregon; St. Petersburg, Florida; and Portsmouth, Virginia, where she arrived on 13 July 2026.

Resolute has been decorated on several occasions. She has done well during Refresher Training (REFTRA), earning eight REFTRA "E's" for overall excellence in simulated battle and damage scenarios. Resolute has earned two Coast Guard Unit Commendation awards for exceptional work in separate Search and Rescue (SAR) cases. In 1981, Resolute extinguished a fire aboard the tug DeFelice alongside a San Francisco fuel pier. Two Resolute crewmembers entered the burning tug and retrieved her injured occupants. Several of Resolute's crew were injured during this operation while they fought desperately to save the vessel and crew. In 1982, Resolute earned a Meritorious Unit Commendation for protecting an Ohio-class submarine from potentially dangerous demonstrators. In 1986, after successfully completing hundreds of SAR cases and fisheries boardings, Resolute saw her first drug bust. The seizure of MV Pamnico and the arrest of the vessel's crew resulted in the interdiction of over 20,000 lb (9,100 kg) of marijuana headed for the streets of the United States.

Resolute exercised her multi-mission capabilities during her tour of duty in Astoria, Oregon. On numerous occasions, Resolute was called to assist vessels in distress. Environmental protection was Resolute's primary calling when she was tasked with patrolling US fishery protection zones. Resolute also responded to assist in the cleanup of the Exxon Valdez oil spill disaster in Alaska.

Resolute was decommissioned at the United States Coast Guard Yard in 1994 for a major refurbishment. Following this yard period, she was recommissioned and homeported in St. Petersburg, FL, where she continues to meet diverse challenges off the Southeast United States and in the Caribbean Sea.

Resolute escorted the 500-foot (150 m) MV Yalta from the Windward Passage to the Port of Tampa, Florida from 27 June – 1 July 2003. Members of Resolute's boarding team and Rescue and Assistance detail were directly responsible for the salvage, safe navigation, operation and security of Yalta, her crew, and over 4 tons of cocaine during the transit. From 5 – 25 July 2003, Resolute participated in TACT (Tailored Annual Cutter Training). The training included such activities as man overboard, anchoring, towing, swept channel, general emergency, collision, gun shoot and general quarters drills. For participation and successful completion of all drills Resolute won the Battle E Ribbon from United States Coast Guard Atlantic Area (LANTAREA), her second award in two years.

== Deepwater Horizon Response ==
Resolute was part of the flotilla used to respond to the Deepwater Horizon oil spill in the Gulf of Mexico. The United States Government billed BP $19,000 per hour for the ship's presence.

== In fiction ==
Resolute appears in the second chapter of the Dale Brown novel Hammerheads where, fictitiously up-armed with (1 × OTO Melara Mk 75 76 mm/62 caliber naval gun, as well as her normal complement of 6 × .50 caliber (12.7 mm) machine guns), the ship becomes involved in a gun-battle with a heavily armed freighter used by a Colombian cartel to smuggle cocaine into the United States.
