= United States Coast Guard Yard =

- U.S. Coast Guard Yard Curtis Bay
- U.S. National Register of Historic Places
- U.S. Historic district
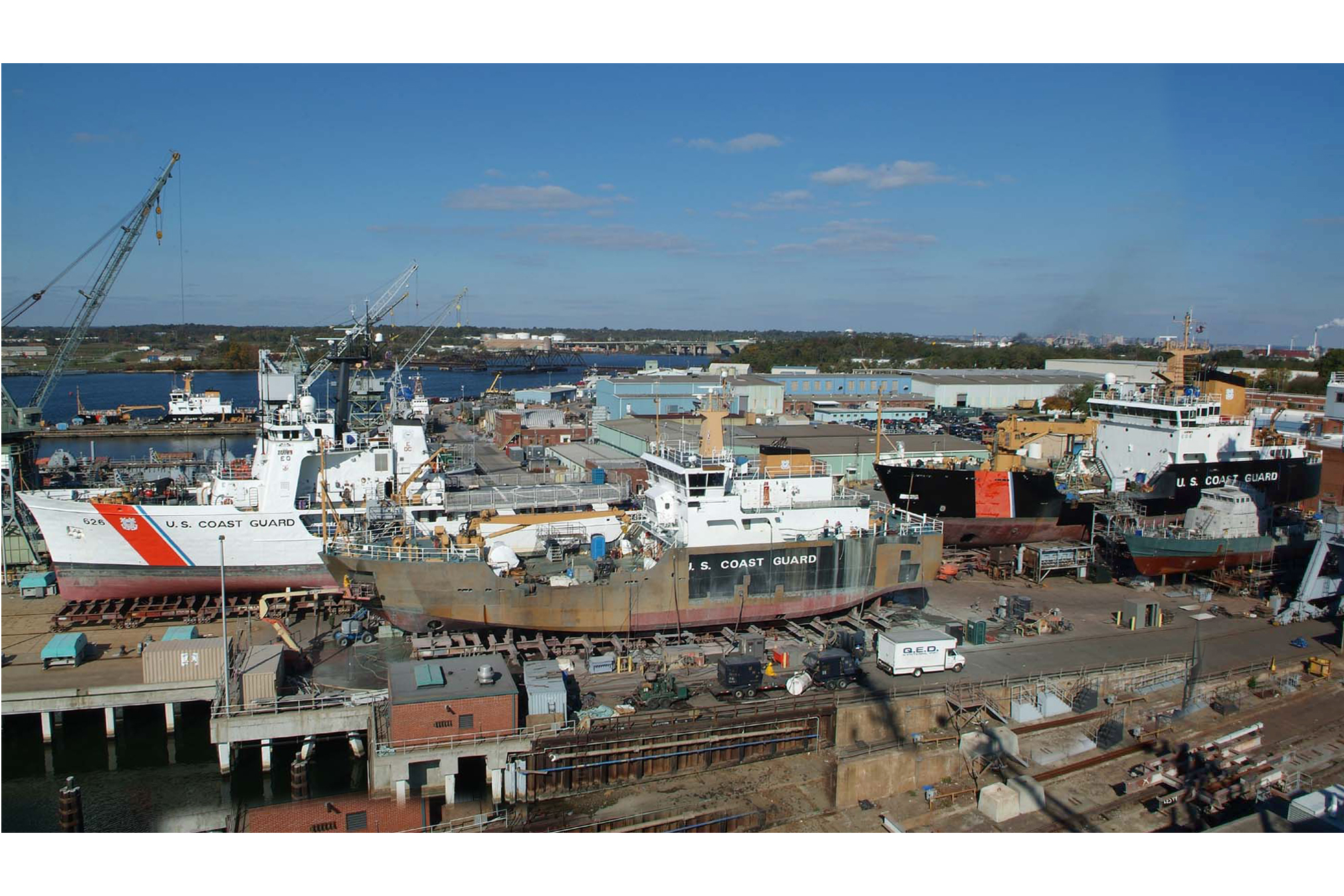
- Coast Guard Yard showing USCGCs Dependable, Abbie Burgess, Willow, and Tybee

- Location within Baltimore
- Nearest city: Baltimore, Maryland
- Coordinates: 39°11′59″N 76°34′2″W
- NRHP reference No.: 83002924
- Added to NRHP: August 05, 1983

The United States Coast Guard Yard or just Coast Guard Yard is a United States Coast Guard operated shipyard located on Curtis Bay in northern Anne Arundel County, Maryland, just south of the Baltimore city limits. It is the Department of Homeland Security's largest industrial facility. It is a division of the Coast Guard's Surface Forces Logistics Center command. It is the Coast Guard's sole shipbuilding and major repair facility, and part of the Coast Guard's core industrial base and fleet support operations. Engineering, logistics, and maintenance responsibilities and complete life-cycle support; installation, operations, maintenance and ultimately replacement. Its annual budget is $100 million.

== History ==
=== 1899–1909 ===
Since 1899, the United States Coast Guard Yard has built, repaired and renovated ships for the U.S. Coast Guard. It is the service's sole shipbuilding and major repair facility. The Coast Guard Yard was established on the shores of Arundel Cove off of Curtis Creek and Curtis Bay in south Baltimore, Maryland and neighboring northern Anne Arundel County. In April, 1899, the former United States Revenue Cutter Service (RCS) leased 36 acres (150,000 m^{2}) of farmland surrounding Arundel Cove. Two months later, Lieutenant John C. Moore, USRCS, arrived aboard the side-wheeler steamboat USRC Colfax to begin establishing a shipyard. Lieutenant Moore set up four small buildings including a lumber mill. The following year saw the arrival of the Salmon P. Chase, a training ship for the USRCS. The crew set up permanent quarters, marking also the beginning of the United States Coast Guard Academy. Five years later, in 1905, the United States Congress authorized the purchase of the land on which the depot sat and with additional surrounding properties ending the previous leasing arrangements. Throughout its first decade, the depot repaired many lifesaving boats, constructed a variety of small boats, conducted overhauls and painted USRCS cutters.

=== 1909–1919 ===
The depot's facilities were consistently improved during the 1910s. New construction included a boiler and pump house, a foundry, boat, sheetmetal, electrical, paint, upholstery and blacksmith shops, new mess halls, barracks, garages, recreation building and storage structures. In 1915, when the Revenue Cutter Service and Lifesaving Service combined to form the U. S. Coast Guard, the depot was selected as the site to train surfmen in the care and operation of gasoline engines. The engine school was housed in a shed along the west depot boundary.

=== 1919–1929 ===
During the 1920s, production of boats, canvas work and numerous other articles for the needs of the service were stepped up. Extensive overhauls and repairs were performed on the then-modern vessels Yamacraw, Seneca, Seminole and many 100', 125' patrol boats and tugs. The 500 workers of the depot included civilian employees along with enlisted men. In 1928, there were 245 wage board and 2 classified employees on the civilian payrolls while the military complement was 250. The work load was flexible, increasing considerably in the summer months and decreasing in the winter months.

=== 1929–1939 ===
By the 1930s, many of the original buildings and equipment at the depot had become outdated. New boat, gas engine and machine shops were built and a 40-ton marine railway was installed. With the transfer of the United States Lighthouse Service of the Department of Commerce to the Coast Guard in 1939, buoy construction became another major depot function.

=== 1939–1949 ===
With the onset of World War II, the depot underwent extensive expansion. Improvements included a 3000-ton floating drydock, two shipways and a 320' x 60' concrete pier with tower crane. The depot, now comparable in size and functions to a medium-size navy shipyard, was officially designated the U.S. Coast Guard Yard. Work involved repair of vessels including submarines, buoy manufacturing, production of canvas work for the Coast Guard and building over 300 small wooden boats annually. Additional work included the construction of the largest cutters ever built at the yard – the 255' cutters Mendota and Pontchartrain. The yard employed 3100 civilian workers during World War II. Besides the assigned military complement, the Coast Guard's wartime training station or boot camp added to the number of personnel at the yard.

=== 1949–1959 ===
As the yard reduced its work force to fit the service's post war needs, vessel overhaul, gun repair work, buoy construction and miscellaneous manufacturing made up much of the yard's work load. The 1950s saw the construction of three hundred 40' steel lifesaving patrol boats, the Coast Guard lightships San Francisco and Ambrose and small craft like the 36'8" motor lifeboats. In February, 1953, the first of the 95' steel patrol boats was launched at the yard. In total, fifty-eight 95-footers were built for the Coast Guard and the Navy throughout the 1950s and early-1960s. The yard continued to overhaul aging Coast Guard and Navy ships. Such cutters were Chilula, Avoyel, Dexter, and Commanche. In March, 1958, the Coast Guard Cutter Azalea, a 100' buoy tender, was launched at the yard.

=== 1959–1969 ===
The first of 53 cutters built at the yard under the 82' patrol boat program was launched in February, 1960. During the Vietnam War, 26 of the yard-built 82-footers served with Coast Guard Squadron One as a part of the Navy's Operation Market Time. In April, 1962, the prototype of the 44' steel self-righting motor lifeboats (MLB) was launched. One of these was later built for the Royal National Lifeboat Institution in the United Kingdom as the prototype for their Waveney-class. During the next 10 years, the yard built 110 44' MLBs. In May, 1965, the yard sent its first 210' USCG Medium Endurance Cutter down the shipways, Confidence. The 210' cutters Resolute, Durable, Decisive and Alert were also constructed at the yard. During the 1960s and into the early-1970s, the yard constructed five 157' buoy tenders – Red Wood, Red Beech, Red Birch, Red Cedar and Red Oak. Construction began on the Red Cedar in July, 1969. Small boat construction during the 60's, included 206 25'8" fiberglass motor surfboats.

=== 1969–1979 ===
The 1970s engaged the yard in a flurry of activity. The trades continued the manufacturing of the Coast Guard's lighted buoys, a program which began at the yard during the Second World War. Constructed in an assembly-line mode, lighted reflector buoys – large, steel buoys used for around-the-clock aids-to-navigation and lighted ice buoys used for heavy ice conditions were manufactured at the yard. Begun in 1975, the yard became the sole source for overhaul of the Coast Guard's 5" 38 caliber gun mount. The 5" gun mounts were used on the service's 378' cutters. In 1971, the yard completed construction of a prototype 41' utility boat (UTB) which had an aluminum hull and fiberglass superstructure. The yard-built boat was adopted and from 1973 through the early-1980s, the yard constructed 207 41' UTB's. The craft was well known to recreational and commercial boaters throughout the United States and was used primarily for search and rescue. The yard had a proven record for the design of experimental maritime projects. The construction of the prototype Stable Semi-Submerged Platform, or SSP, was the highlight of the 1970s. The SSP Kailmalino used the SWATH concept – Small Waterplane Area Twin Hull. The craft operated successfully for many years in the Hawaiian Islands. In 1974, the yard laid the keel for a 160' single unit construction tender, the CGC Pamlico. Throughout the remainder of the decade, 3 more 160' construction tenders were built at the Yard: the CGC Hudson, CGC Kennebec, and CGC Saginaw. From the late 1970s into the early 1980s, the yard renovated sixteen 95' patrol boats. Built at the yard in the 1950s, the cutters were in need of modernization or repair.

=== 1979–1989 ===
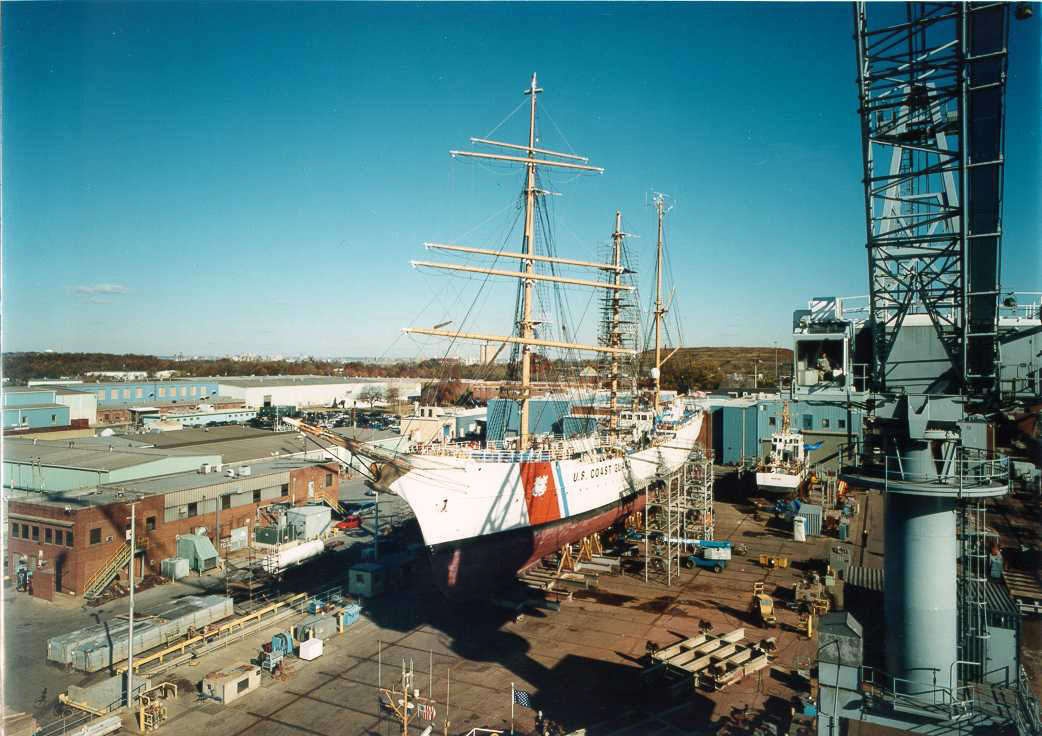
USCGC Eagle repaired at the Coast Guard Shipyard.

Entering the 1980s, the yard constructed a prototype oil skimmer used to clean up oil spills. The Zero Relative Velocity Skimmer (ZRV) represented the best available technology in the Coast Guard's field of fast current pollution control research. The first of the new 270' medium endurance cutters, the Bear, arrived at the yard in 1983 to begin post-construction and electronics work. The yard accomplished a retrofit on 12 additional 270' cutters throughout the 1980s. Beginning in 1984, the yard began the Service Life Extension Program (SLEP) for nine 180' buoy tenders in the Coast Guard fleet. From the mid-1980s through the early-1990s, the cutters Sorrrel, Gentian, Cowslip, Conifer, Madrona, Laurel, Papaw, Sweetgum and Buttonwood. received mid-life overhauls and given an anticipated 20 additional years of service life as a result of the yard's renovation. In 1984, the yard recommissioned the first 210' medium endurance cutter under the Coast Guard's Major Maintenance Availability Program (MMA). The cutters Active, Confidence and Reliance received their upgrades during the 1980s. Eleven more vessels would undergo renovation throughout the 1990s before the program came to a close. The yard's overhaul gave each MMA cutter an anticipated additional 15 years of service life. In 1985, the yard completed a major renovation of a ferryboat for Coast Guard use at Governor's Island, New York. The Kulshan, a 30-year-old vessel bought by the Coast Guard from the State of Washington's ferry system, was renamed the Governor following renovation at the yard. As the 1980s came to a close, the Coast Guard tasked the yard with construction of six river barges for Coast Guard use on the Mississippi and Missouri Rivers. The project was transferred to the yard when the awarded private contractor filed for bankruptcy prior to contract completion.

In 1983, the U.S. Coast Guard Yard at Curtis Bay was listed on the National Register of Historic Places.

=== 1990–Present ===
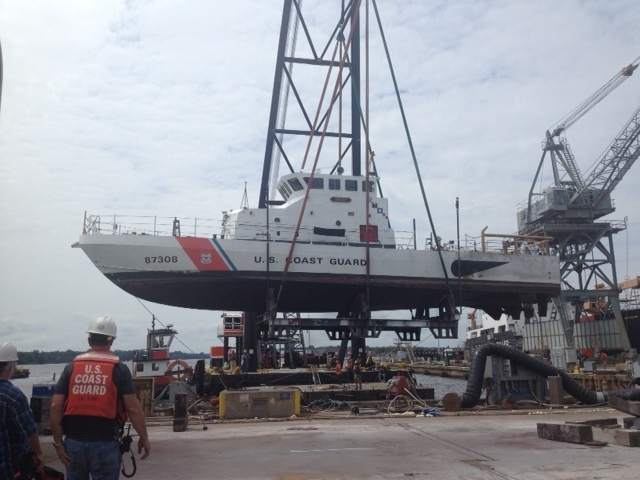
Coast Guard Yard dry-docks Cutter Chinook

After completing an extensive, four-year repair project on the barque USCGC Eagle in the 1980s, the cutter returned to the yard in 1995 and 1998 for repair availabilities. The yard is building an anticipated 26 small aids-to-navigation workboats, the 49' BUSLs, through the year 2000. The first BUSL was launched in August, 1997. The yard completed the 210' Major Maintenance Availability Program in October, 1998, with the recommissioning of the cutter Decisive. Fourteen of the Coast Guard's 210' cutters underwent, respectively, an 18-month, $21 million renovation at the yard since the program began in 1984. With the dedication of the new $18 million shiplift in November, 1997, the yard increased its capability to accommodate repairs of Coast Guard vessels. The land-based shiphandling facility replaced the yard's nearly 60-year-old drydocks. It is environmentally-friendly and offers lower maintenance costs. The yard is the sole source for major repair of naval weapons systems used by the Coast Guard. Topping the list is the repair of the MK 75 76 mm guns and includes a contract with the Naval Sea Systems Command for the overhaul of the Saudi Arabian MK 75 weapons systems. The yard expanded its market base in the mid-1990s to include the overhaul of the Paxman engine, the main propulsion engine in the 110' patrol boat. The work is considered a primary example of core work for the shipyard. The yard became the first organization in the United States government to achieve ISO 9001 certification in 1995 and ISO 9001 recertification in 1998. ISO 9001 is a set of internationally recognized standards for quality management systems.
