= Scuttlebutt =

Slang term for rumor or gossip

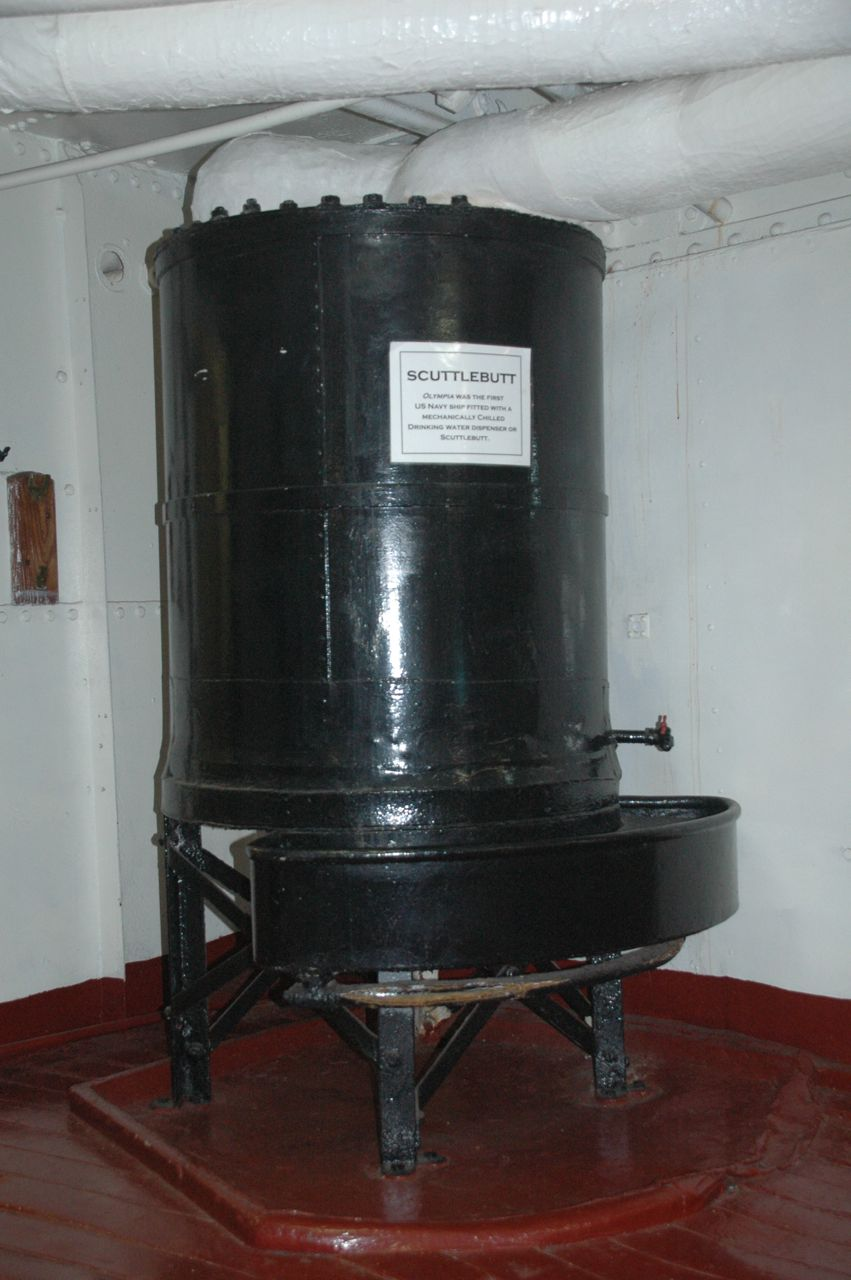
A US Navy scuttlebutt

Scuttlebutt in slang usage means rumor or gossip, deriving from the nautical term for the cask used to serve water (or, later, a water fountain).

The term corresponds to the colloquial concept of a water cooler in an office setting, which at times becomes the focus of congregation and casual discussion. Water for immediate consumption on a sailing ship was conventionally stored in a scuttled butt: a butt (cask) which had been scuttled by making a hole in it so the water could be withdrawn. Since sailors exchanged gossip when they gathered at the scuttlebutt for a drink of water, scuttlebutt became Navy slang for gossip or rumours.

== Competition ==
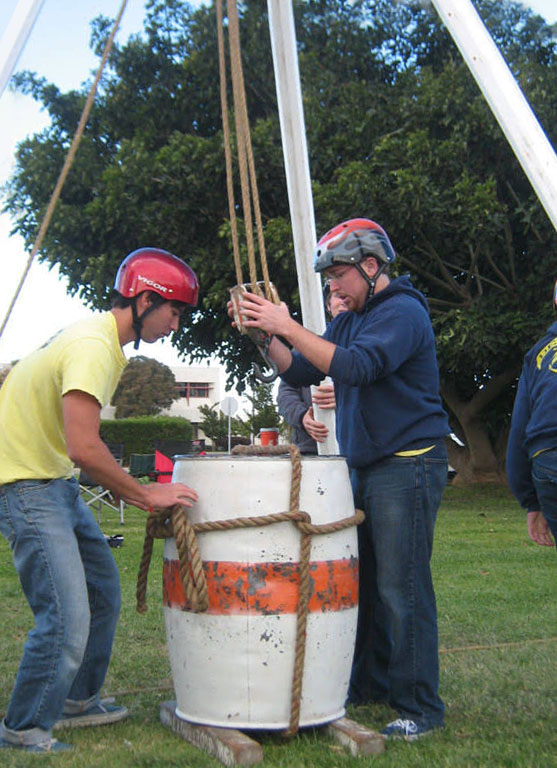
A hoisting competition

Hoisting the scuttlebutt is an event that Sea Scouts participate in during regattas such as the Old Salts Regatta. In the event a 50-gallon drum of water is lifted 3 feet off the ground using a block and tackle and a tripod. The tripod is constructed from three spars, which are tied together by "head-lashing." The block and tackle is suspended from the top of the tripod, which is then erected by the crew. A barrel hitch is tied around the drum, which is then lifted off the ground. It must then be lowered and the equipment "broken down" back to its original condition. Time stops when all crew members are back in line and called to attention by the coxswain. There are three runs per crew, and the crew with the fastest time wins. Disqualification can occur when water is spilled or if crew other than the coxswain (and sometimes the barrel hitchers) talk. A run under a minute is generally considered good, though times much lower than this have been seen in competition.

=== History ===
This event is based on activities that crews used to have to perform on ships frequently. Water or other goods such as cargo would be stored below deck. A tripod would be put up on the deck over an open hatch, and the cargo lifted up out of the stores. The modern event is based on this practice.

== See also ==
- Furphy, World War I Australian Army slang having the same meaning and similar provenance as above.
- Scuttlebutt (software), an open-source program for a social network (scuttlebutt.nz), also used in Manyverse (an off-the-grid social network)
