= Watchkeeping =

Assignment of sailors to tasks

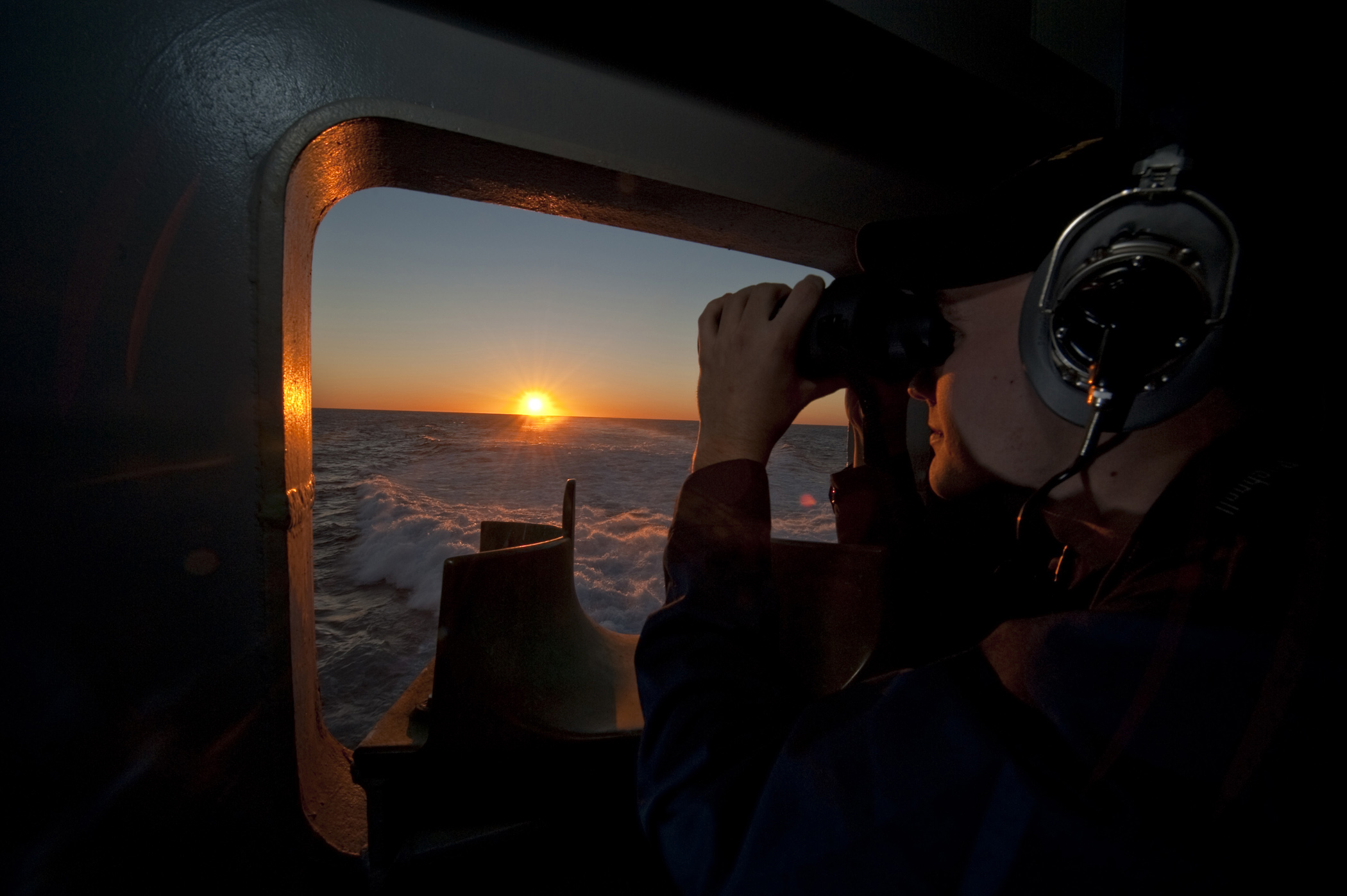
A sailor keeps watch aboard USS George H.W. Bush.

Watchkeeping or watchstanding is the assignment of sailors to specific roles on a ship to operate it continuously. These assignments, also known at sea as watches, are constantly active as they are considered essential to the safe operation of the vessel and also allow the ship to respond to emergencies and other situations quickly. These watches are divided into work periods to ensure that the roles are always occupied at all times, while those members of the crew who are assigned to work during a watch are known as watchkeepers.

On a typical seafaring vessel, be it naval or merchant, personnel "keep a watch" in various locations and duties across the ship, such as the bridge and engine room. Typical bridge watchkeepers include a lookout and a deck officer who is responsible for the safe navigation of the ship; whereas in the engine room, an engine officer ensures that running machinery continues to operate within tolerances.

== Types of watches ==
A wide variety of types of watches have developed due to the different needs aboard merchant and naval vessels. This table gives some examples:

	Naval	Merchant
Navigational	Officers: Command duty officer; Officer of the deck; Junior officer of the deck; Junior officer of the watch; Conning officer; Enlisted: Quartermaster of the watch; Boatswain's mate of the watch; Helmsman; Lee helmsman; After steering watch; Lookout; Low-visibility lookout	Officer of the watch; Helmsman; Lookout
Engineering	Officers: Engineering officer of the watch; Enlisted: Damage control watch; Boiler watch; Electrical and auxiliary systems watch; Propulsion watch	Engineering officer of the watch
Security	Petty officer of the watch; Gangway watch; Security watch; Sounding and security patrol; Barracks security watch; Sentry	Gangway watch; Anti-piracy watch
Communications	Communications watch officer; Radio watch; Message center; Signal bridge watches; Messenger of the watch	Radio watch
Combat	Tactical action officer; Combat information center watch officer; Other CIC watches	
Others	Anchor watch; In-port boat officer; Department duty officer; Fire watch	Cargo watch; Anchor watch

== Watch systems ==
A watch system, watch schedule, or watch bill is a method of assigning regular periods of watchkeeping duty aboard ships and some other areas of employment. A watch system allows the ship's crew to operate the ship 24 hours a day while also allowing individual personnel adequate time for rest and other duties.

Watch durations vary between vessels due to some reasons and restrictions; some watch systems aim to ensure that each team takes turns to work late at night, while other systems ensure the same team consistently works at the same hours every day.

Many watch systems incorporate the concept of a dog watch, whereby one watch is split into two shorter watches so that there is an odd number each day. Doing so allows crew members to have a different watch schedule each day. Often, the dog watches are set at dinner time to allow the entire crew to be fed in short order.

=== Traditional system ===
A 2-section dogged watch
Name	Time	Day 1	Day 2	Day 3
First watch	2000–0000	Team 1	Team 2	Team 1
Middle watch	0000–0400	Team 2	Team 1	Team 2
Morning watch	0400–0800	Team 1	Team 2	Team 1
Forenoon watch	0800–1200	Team 2	Team 1	Team 2
Afternoon watch	1200–1600	Team 1	Team 2	Team 1
First dog watch	1600–1800	Team 2	Team 1	Team 2
Second dog watch	1800–2000	Team 1	Team 2	Team 1

The traditional watch system arose from sailing ships of the late 19th century and was used by the Royal Navy and many other Commonwealth navies. It consisted of 5 four-hour periods and 2 two-hour periods. Those members of the crew whose work must be done at all times of the day were assigned to one of two divisions: the starboard or the port division. These can be further divided into two parts, e.g., First Port, Second Starboard.

The Royal Navy traditional submarine three watch system is 2 on 4 off during the day (8 a.m. to 8 p.m.) and 3 on 6 off during the night (8 p.m. to 8 a.m.).

=== Traditional system with three sections ===
A 3-section dogged watch
Name	Time	Day 1	Day 2	Day 3
First watch	2000–0000	Team 1	Team 2	Team 3
Middle watch	0000–0400	Team 2	Team 3	Team 1
Morning watch	0400–0800	Team 3	Team 1	Team 2
Forenoon watch	0800–1200	Team 1	Team 2	Team 3
Afternoon watch	1200–1600	Team 2	Team 3	Team 1
First dog watch	1600–1800	Team 3	Team 1	Team 2
Last dog watch	1800–2000	Team 1	Team 2	Team 3

The same arrangement of watch times can also be used with a crew divided into three sections. This gives each sailor more time off-duty, sometimes allowing sleeping periods of over seven hours. Names for the three watches—instead of Port and Starboard—vary from ship to ship. Naming schemes such as "Foremast", "Mainmast" and "Mizzen"; and "Red", "White" and "Blue" are common.

=== Five and dime ===
1× 4-hour and 4× 5-hour watch sections
	Day 1	Day 2	Day 3
2200–0200	Team 1	Team 3	Team 2
0200–0700	Team 2	Team 1	Team 3
0700–1200	Team 3	Team 2	Team 1
1200–1700	Team 1	Team 3	Team 2
1700–2200	Team 2	Team 1	Team 3

The so-called "five-and-dime" arrangement splits the day into five-hour watches, with the exception of a four-hour watch from 22:00 to 02:00.

=== Six-hour shift ===
Six-hour watch sections
	Day 1	Day 2	Day 3
0100–0700	Team Blue	Team Gold	Team White
0700–1300	Team Gold	Team White	Team Blue
1300–1900	Team White	Team Blue	Team Gold
1900–0100	Team Blue	Team Gold	Team White

The "six-hour shift" splits the day into four six-hour watches, permitting a three-section crew to maximize rest time in a three-day working cycle. Also, this watch system takes into better account the meal times (of a four-meals-a-day system), so that the ingoing team will be fed first, then keep watch, while the outgoing team will be relieved of watch, and then proceed to the mess deck.

=== US submarine system with three sections ===
Former 18-hr 3-section submarine watch
Name	Time	Day 1	Day 2	Day 3
Mid watch	2330–0530	Team 1	Team 2	Team 3
Morning watch	0530–1130	Team 2	Team 3	Team 1
Afternoon watch	1130–1730	Team 3	Team 1	Team 2
Evening watch	1730–2330	Team 1	Team 2	Team 3

Aboard United States submarines, the crew is typically divided into three sections, with each section keeping 8 hours of watch followed by 16 hours off-watch. This schedule has been a fairly recent change to submariner work and rest routines. For nearly 45 years before 2015, submariners were on 18-hour days with 6 hours of watch followed by 12 hours off watch. The 12 hours off-watch were further divided into the first 6 hours being used for maintenance, cleaning, and entertainment; while the second 6 hours were usually for sleeping.

Note that this arrangement resulted in one of the sections having two watches in one (24-hour) day, and there were no dog watches. Also, watch reliefs occurred no later than the bottom of the hour (2330, 0530, 1130, 1730). Typically, the first 30 minutes of the hour were used for the oncoming section to eat while the second 30 minutes of the hour were used for the off-going section to eat.

=== One-in-two watch system ===
A one-in-two watch
	Day 1	Day 2	Day 3
0000–0700	Team 1	Team 1	Team 1
0700–1200	Team 2	Team 2	Team 2
1200–1700	Team 1	Team 1	Team 1
1700–0000	Team 2	Team 2	Team 2

Some warships now use the one-in-two system, also known as 7s and 5s, for the duration of the watches. This watch system is also sometimes referred to as Port and Starboard watches. This gives the sailors a longer sleeping period than the traditional two-watch system, while still maintaining the ability for the ship to function. Meals are generally scheduled around the watch turnovers at 0700, 1200, and 1700; sometimes a light midnight meal known as mid-rats (midnight rations) is provided for the 0000 turnover.

=== Swedish system ===
A 3-section Swedish watch
	Day 1	Day 2	Day 3
0000–0600	Team 1	Team 1	Team 1
0600–1000	Team 2	Team 2	Team 2
1000–1200	Team 1	Team 1	Team 1
1200–1400	Team 3	Team 3	Team 3
1400–1800	Team 2	Team 2	Team 2
1800–2400	Team 3	Team 3	Team 3

Various alternative watch schedules have been devised, which are typically referred to as Swedish watches. Although there is no standard for what constitutes a Swedish watch, the variations all feature some element of extended watches to accommodate longer time off. Like the traditional watch system, they begin at 0000 hours. Some popular variations have durations of 6, 6, 4, 4, 4 and 5, 5, 5, 5, 4.

=== Merchant ships ===
Standard merchant watch system
	Day 1	Day 2	Day 3
0400–0800	Team 1	Team 1	Team 1
0800–1200	Team 2	Team 2	Team 2
1200–1600	Team 3	Team 3	Team 3
1600–2000	Team 1	Team 1	Team 1
2000–0000	Team 2	Team 2	Team 2
0000–0400	Team 3	Team 3	Team 3

On merchant ships, watchkeepers typically keep watch for six periods of four consecutive hours. This system has a couple of advantages: it is easy to remember and it is consistent. For example, a member of watch team 1 will only have to remember that he is on the "4–8" watch, and knows that he goes on watch at 4 a.m. and 4 p.m. This scheme also allows inexperienced watchkeepers to keep watch from 8–12 a.m. and 8–12 p.m., when senior watchkeepers are likely to be awake and ready to assist in case of trouble.

By custom, in a ship with five deck officers the junior third mate takes the 8 to 12 watch, the senior third mate the 12 to 4 watch, and the second mate the 4 to 8 watch. This enables the second officer, who is the ship's navigator, to take morning and evening star sights. In ships with only four deck officers, the third officer will keep the 8 to 12 (Substituted for the Captain in the case of a ship with only three deck officers), the second officer the 12 to 4, and the chief mate (equivalent to the executive officer in a navy ship) the 4 to 8 watch. The reason for this is to enable the chief mate to assign work to the deck gang before the ship's day begins, and to inspect it before going on watch at 1600 hours.

== Ship's bell ==
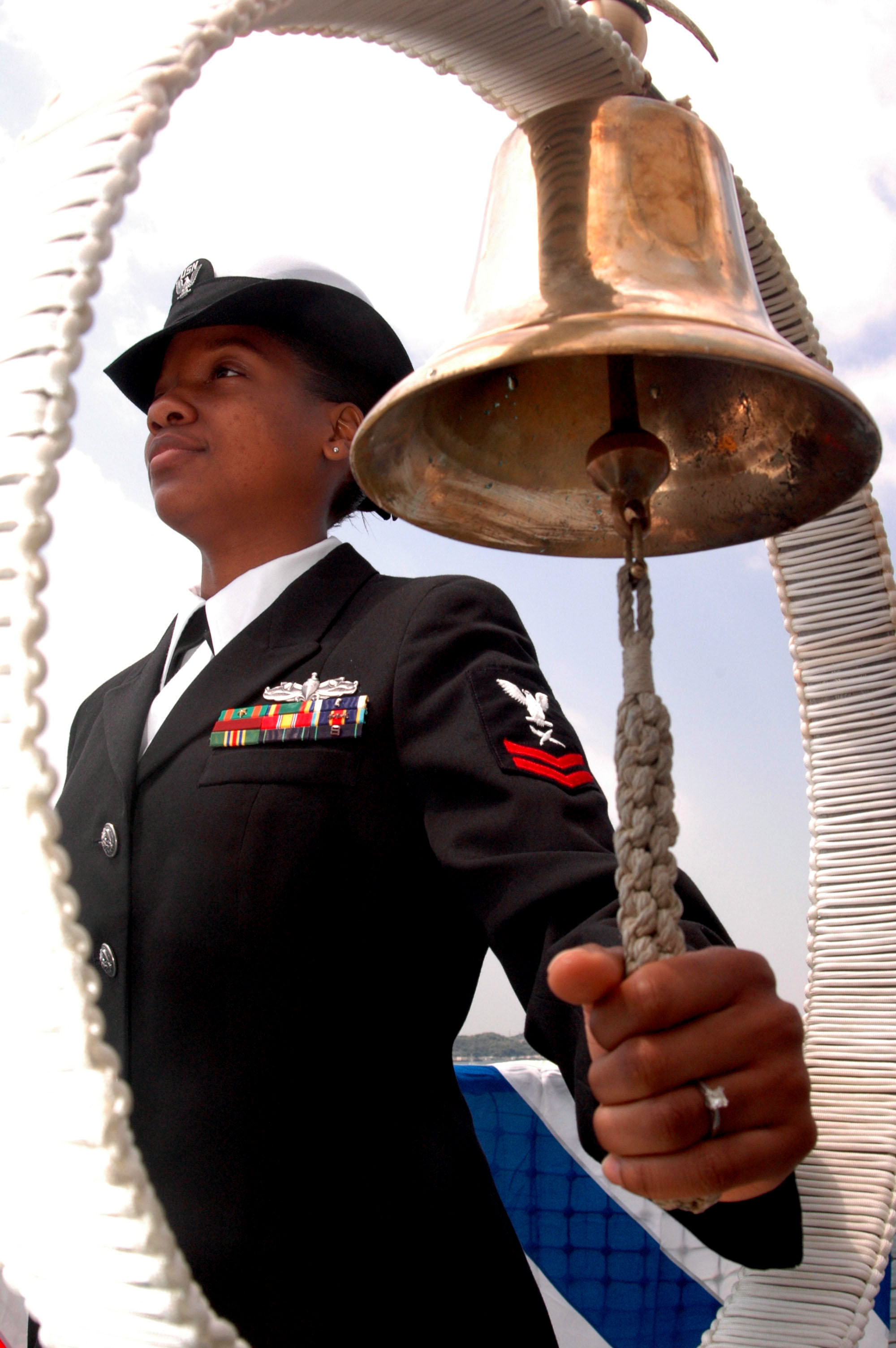
Ringing the bell on the aft flight deck

A ship's bell is used in concert with a watch system to indicate the time using bell strikes to mark the time and help sailors know when to change watches. Unlike civil clock bells, the strikes of a ship's bell do not accord to the number of the hour. Instead, there are eight bells, one for each half-hour of a four-hour watch. Bells would be struck every half-hour, and in a pattern of pairs for easier counting, with any odd bells at the end of the sequence.

== See also ==
- Canonical hours
- Duty officer
- USS Fitzgerald and MV ACX Crystal collision
- Melbourne–Evans collision
- Work shift

== Sources ==
- United States Naval Institute (2017) [1902]. The Bluejackets' Manual (25th ed.). Annapolis, MD: United States Naval Institute. ISBN 978-1612519746.
- James Stavridis; Robert Girrier (2007). Watch Officer's Guide: A Handbook for All Deck Watch Officers (15th ed.). Annapolis, MD: United States Naval Institute. ISBN 978-1-59114-936-1.
