= Ship floodability =

Susceptibility of a ship's construction to flooding

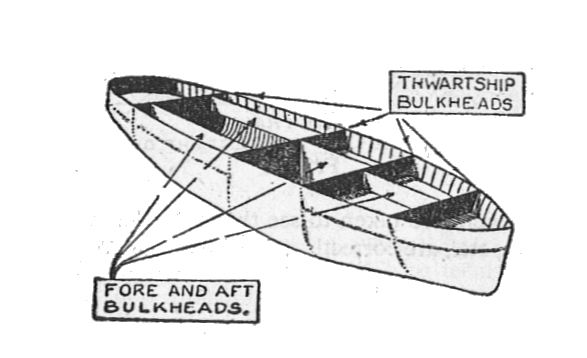
Compartmentalisation of a ship, to reduce floodability

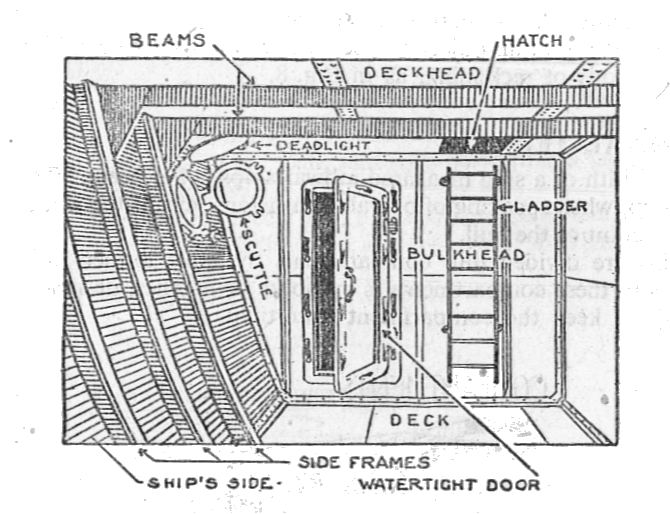
Parts of a water-tight compartment

Floodability is the susceptibility of a ship's construction to flooding. It also refers to the ability to intentionally flood certain areas of the hull for damage control purposes, or to increase stability, which is particularly important in combat vessels, which often face the possibility of serious hull breach due to enemy action, and which rely on well-trained damage controlmen to equalize and then stop flooding of the hull.

Floodability is reduced by dividing the volume of the hull into watertight compartments with decks and bulkheads (which also increase the strength of ships), use of double bottom (or double hull), and by other means. If a ship's hull is divided into watertight compartments, any flooding resulting from a breach of the hull can be contained in the compartments where the flooding occurs. In most cases, the watertight compartments are fitted with a system of automatic doors, which can be triggered either remotely or locally as soon as flooding is detected (an early example of such a system was used on the RMS Titanic, which sank in spite of its watertight bulkheads). Smaller vessels and submarines generally feature watertight hatches between compartments, which are closed manually to block water from escaping the flooded compartment. As long as the flooding is localised, this can allow a ship to retain sufficient buoyancy to remain afloat, but if numerous compartments are opened to the sea, the ship can sink regardless. If a ship is fitted with longitudinal bulkheads (running fore and aft) as well as transverse bulkheads, flooding along one side of the ship can cause a serious list, which can threaten to capsize the vessel. In such cases, damage control parties can intentionally flood the corresponding compartment on the other side, equalizing the list (although this can happen in ships without longitudinal bulkheads, as well). Such techniques can work fore-and-aft as well; for example, if a flooded bow is holding the rudder and propellers out of the water. Some types of ships, such as certain heavy lift vessels, can intentionally flood their own hulls or tanks within their hulls, to sink below the water, and then pump all of the water back out and re-float themselves with the salvaged object on deck. Similarly, submersibles and submarines also produce negative buoyancy by allowing compartments (called "ballast tanks") to flood.

== History ==
The Song dynasty Chinese author Zhu Yu wrote of Song Chinese-invented watertight compartments in his book, Pingzhou Table Talks, written from AD 1111 to 1117 and published in 1119. Chinese shipbuilders made sailboats with bulkheads and watertight compartments as early as the second century AD. Bulkhead watertight compartments improved buoyancy and protected cargo. Development of watertight compartments continued during the Song dynasty in China. The watertight compartments were there to ensure that if one part of the ship was leaking, the ship itself would not sink. Song Chinese naval engineers came up with this idea by cutting up bamboo plants. In a bamboo plant, the stem is split into sections and at the end of a section there is a plug-like device that lets in water, but does not let it out. By using this as a model, they were able to make a large scale version that would protect the ship. In addition, the compartments were used as storage tanks in which fresh water could be stored for sailors on board. Compartments were also used to help control the masts and sails so they could all be used at once. The wide application of Chinese watertight compartments soon spread across East Asia and later to the Europeans through contacts with Indian and Arab merchants.

Watertight compartments were frequently implemented in East Asian ships, and had been implemented in the Mongolian Yuan dynasty maritime warships of Kublai Khan. Chinese seagoing junks often had 14 crosswalls, some of which could be flooded to increase stability or for the carriage of liquids.

Russian naval engineer and mathematician Alexei Krylov and Russian vice-admiral Stepan Makarov worked extensively on the research of ship floodability in the early 20th century.
