= List of United States Coast Guard cutters =

The List of United States Coast Guard Cutters is a listing of all cutters to have been commissioned by the United States Coast Guard during the history of that service. It is sorted by length down to 65', the minimum length of a USCG cutter.

== 420' Healy-class Icebreaker (WAGB) ==
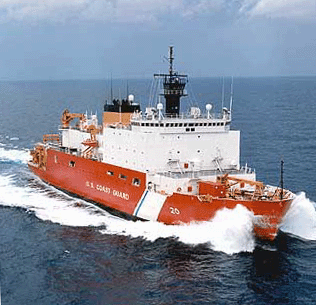
USCGC Healy (WAGB-20)

- USCGC Healy (WAGB-20)

== 418' Legend-class National Security Cutter, Large (WMSL) ==
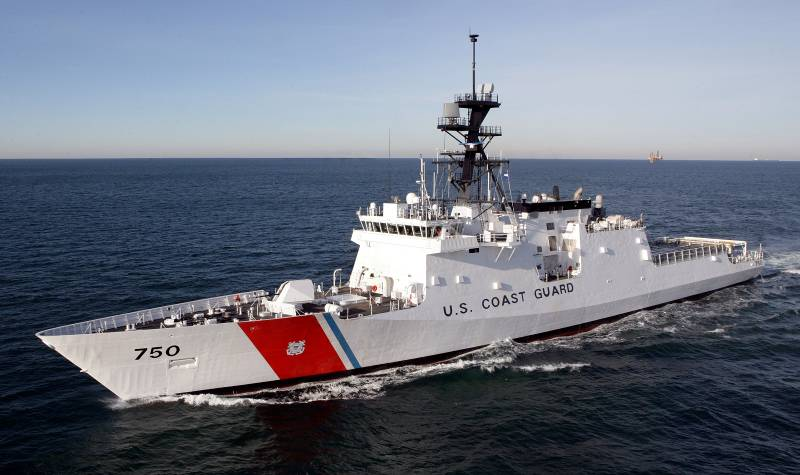
USCGC Bertholf (WMSL-750)

- USCGC Bertholf (WMSL-750)
- USCGC Waesche (WMSL-751)
- USCGC Stratton (WMSL-752)
- USCGC Hamilton (WMSL-753)
- USCGC James (WMSL-754)
- USCGC Munro (WMSL-755)
- USCGC Kimball (WMSL-756)
- USCGC Midgett (WMSL-757)
- USCGC Stone (WMSL-758)
- USCGC Calhoun (WMSL-759)
- USCGC Friedman (WMSL-760)

== 399' Polar-class Heavy Icebreaker (WAGB) ==
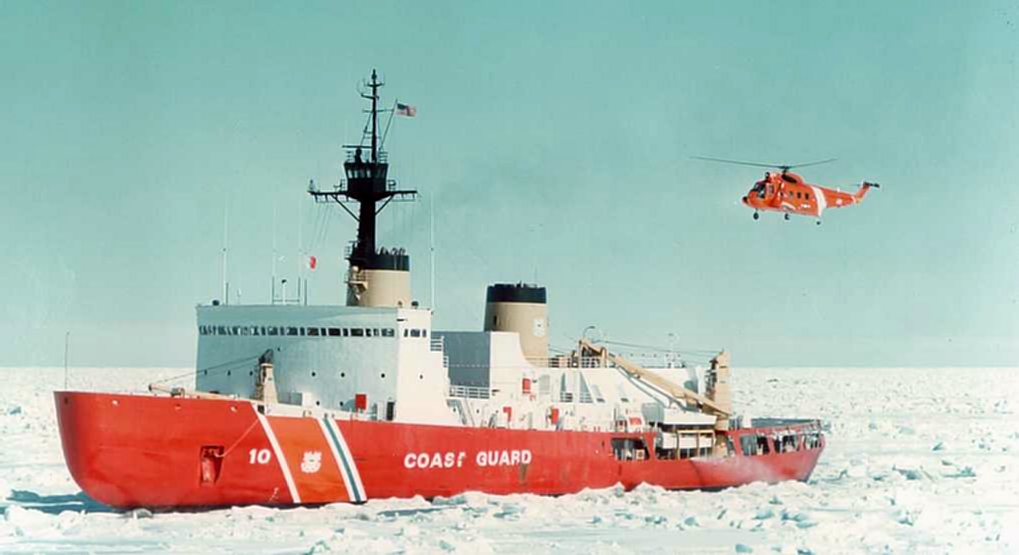
Polar Star, a USCG Polar Class Icebreaker

- USCGC Polar Star (WAGB-10)
- USCGC Polar Sea (WAGB-11)

== 378' High Endurance Cutter (WHEC) ==
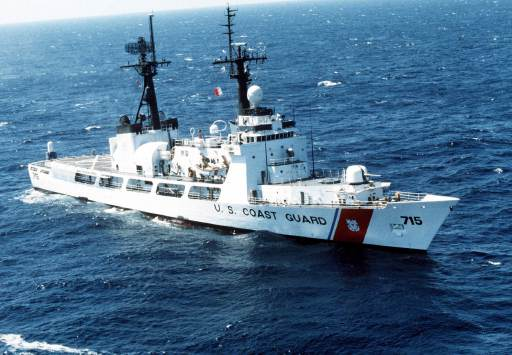
USCGC Hamilton (WHEC-715), a Hamilton class cutter

- USCGC Hamilton (WHEC-715)
- USCGC Dallas (WHEC-716)
- USCGC Mellon (WHEC-717)
- USCGC Chase (WHEC-718)
- USCGC Boutwell (WHEC-719)
- USCGC Sherman (WHEC-720)
- USCGC Gallatin (WHEC-721)
- USCGC Morgenthau (WHEC-722)
- USCGC Rush (WHEC-723)
- USCGC Munro (WHEC-724)
- USCGC Jarvis (WHEC-725)
- USCGC Midgett (WHEC-726)

== 360' Maritime Security Cutter, Medium (WMSM) ==
As of July 2022: 5 cutters ordered; 10 more optioned; 25 cutters total in program of record

- USCGC Argus (WMSM-915)
- USCGC Chase (WMSM-916)
- USCGC Ingham (WMSM-917)
- USCGC Rush (WMSM-918)
- USCGC Pickering (WMSM-919)
- USCGC Icarus (WMSM-920)
- USCGC Active (WMSM-921)
- USCGC Diligence (WMSM-922)
- USCGC Alert (WMSM-923)
- USCGC Vigilant (WMSM-924)
- USCGC Reliance (WMSM-925)

== 338' Alamosa-class Cutter (WAK) ==
- USCGC Kukui (WAK-186)

== 327' Treasury-class Cutter (WPG) ==
- USCGC Bibb (WPG-31)
- USCGC Campbell (WPG-32)
- USCGC Duane (WPG-33)
- USCGC Hamilton (WPG-34)

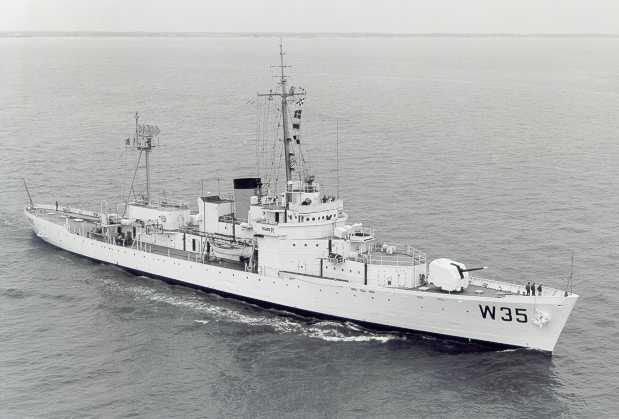
USCGC Ingham (WHEC-35), a Treasury-class cutter

- USCGC Ingham (WHEC-35)
- USCGC Spencer (WPG-36)
- USCGC Taney (WHEC-37)

== 311' Casco-class Seaplane Tender (WAVP) ==
- USCGC Casco (WAVP-370)
- USCGC Matagorda (WAVP-373)
- USCGC Humboldt (WAVP-372)
- USCGC Mackinac (WAVP-371)
- USCGC Absecon (WAVP-374)
- USCGC Chincoteague (WAVP-375)
- USCGC Coos Bay (WAVP-376)
- USCGC Rockaway (WAVP-377)
- USCGC Half Moon (WAVP-378)
- USCGC Unimak (WAVP-379)
- USCGC Yakutat (WAVP-380)
- USCGC Barataria (WAVP-381)
- USCGC Bering Strait (WAVP-382)
- USCGC Castle Rock (WAVP-383), later BRP Francisco Dagohoy

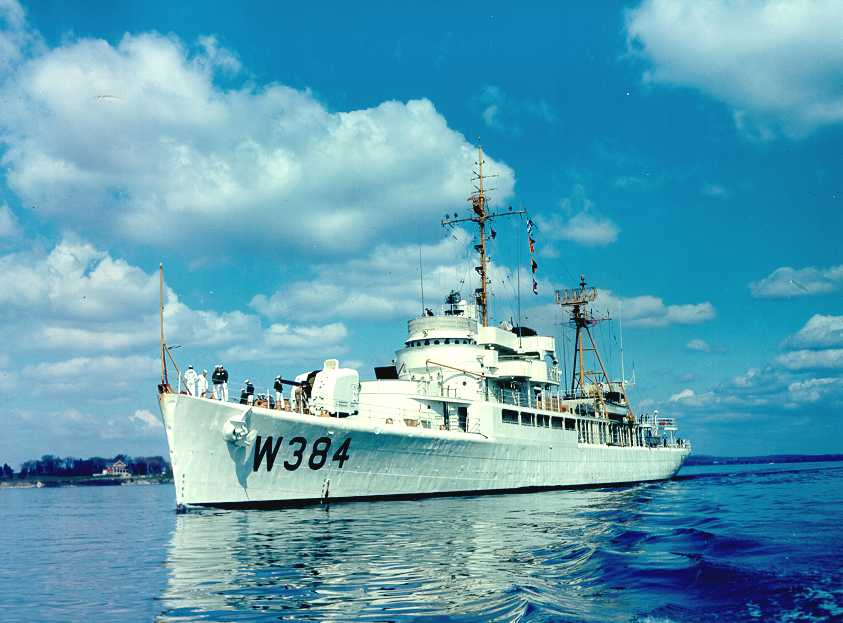
USCGC Cook Inlet (WAVP-384)

- USCGC Cook Inlet (WAVP-384)
- USCGC Dexter (WAVP-385)
- USCGC McCulloch (WAVP-386)
- USCGC Gresham (WAVP-387)

== 309' Icebreaker (WAGB) ==
- USCGC Glacier (WAGB-4)

== 306' Edsall-class Destroyer Escort (WDE) ==
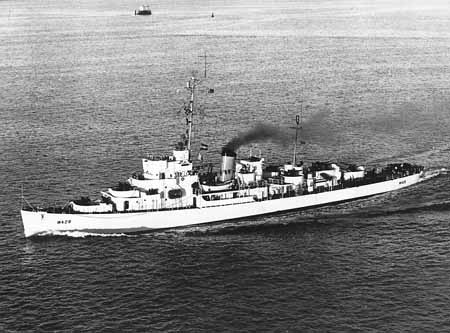
USCGC Finch (WDE-428), a former US Navy Edsall-class destroyer escort

- USCGC Newell (WDE-322)
- USCGC Falgout (WDE-324)
- USCGC Lowe (WDE-325)
- USCGC Finch (WDE-328)
- USCGC Koiner (WDE-331)
- USCGC Forster (WDE-334)
- USCGC Ramsden (WDE-382)
- USCGC Richey (WDE-385)
- USCGC Vance (WDE-387)
- USCGC Durant (WDE-389)
- USCGC Chambers (WDE-391)

== 295' Training Barque Eagle (WIX) ==
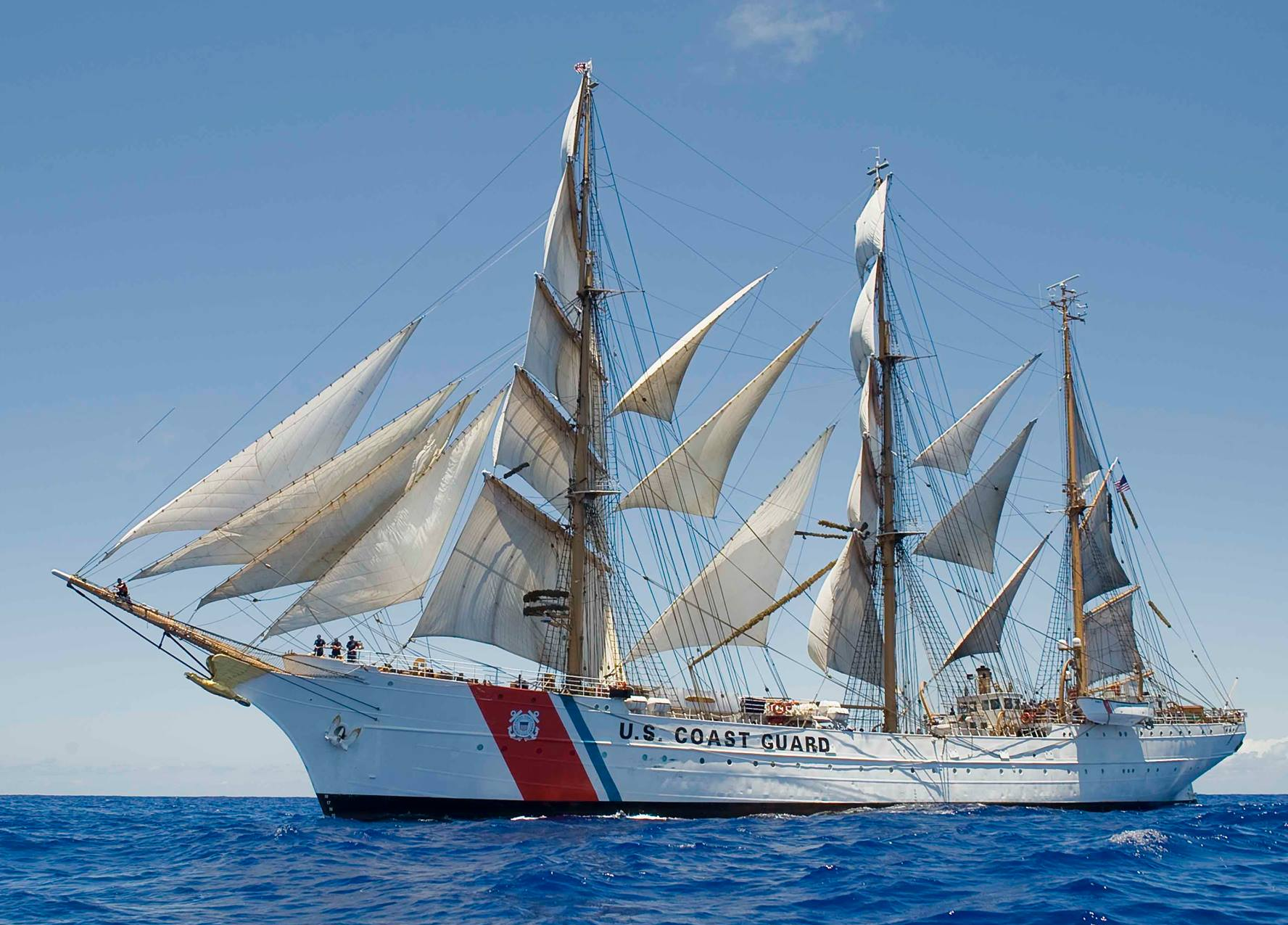
USCGC Eagle under full sail in 2013 in the Caribbean Sea

- USCGC Eagle (WIX-327)

== 290' Medium Great Lakes Icebreaker (WAGB) ==
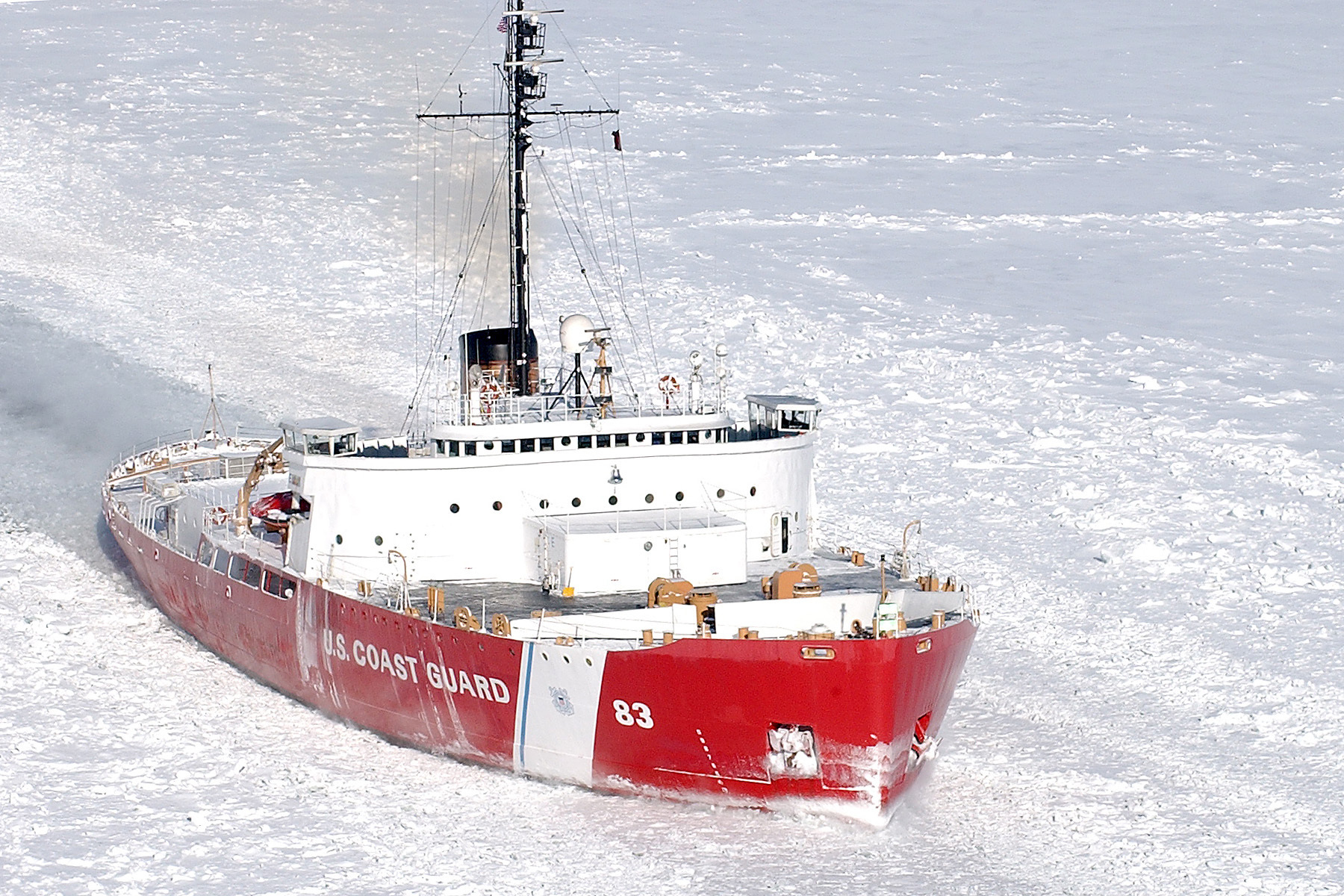
USCGC Mackinaw (WAGB-83) on icebreaking duties in the Straits of Mackinaw

- USCGC Mackinaw (WAGB-83)

== 282' Medium Endurance Cutter (WMEC) ==
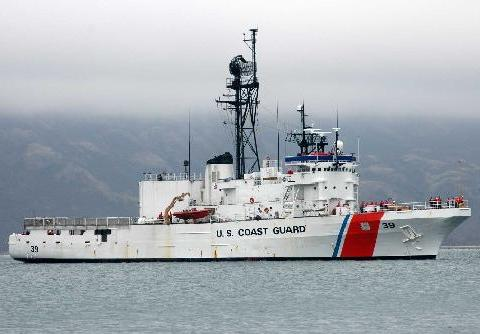
USCGC Alex Haley (WMEC-39)

- USCGC Alex Haley (WMEC-39)

== 270' Medium Endurance Cutter (WMEC) ==
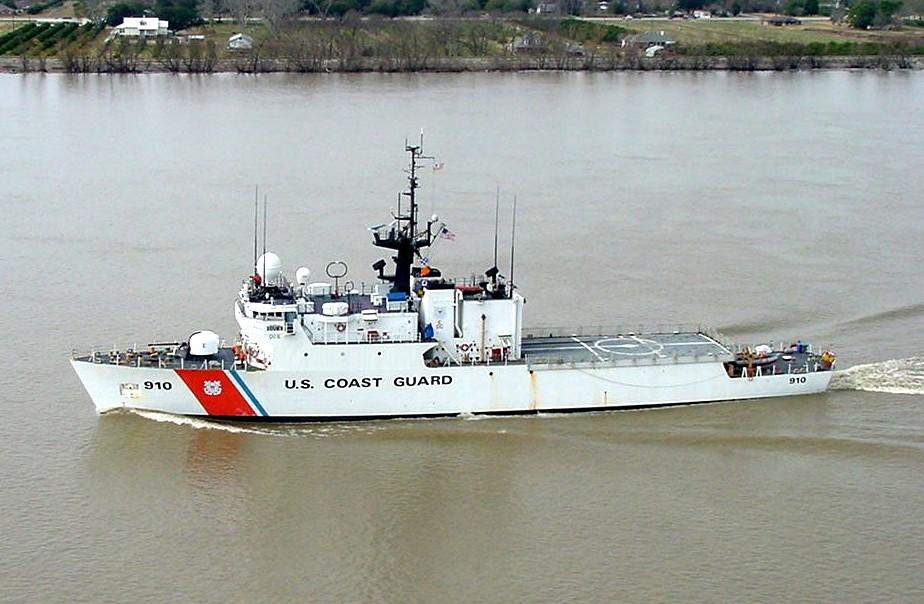
USCGC Thetis (WMEC-910), a Famous-class cutter

- USCGC Bear (WMEC-901)
- USCGC Tampa (WMEC-902)
- USCGC Harriet Lane (WMEC-903)
- USCGC Northland (WMEC-904)
- USCGC Spencer (WMEC-905)
- USCGC Seneca (WMEC-906)
- USCGC Escanaba (WMEC-907)
- USCGC Tahoma (WMEC-908)
- USCGC Campbell (WMEC-909)
- USCGC Thetis (WMEC-910)
- USCGC Forward (WMEC-911)
- USCGC Legare (WMEC-912)
- USCGC Mohawk (WMEC-913)

== 269' Wind-class Icebreaker (WAGB) ==
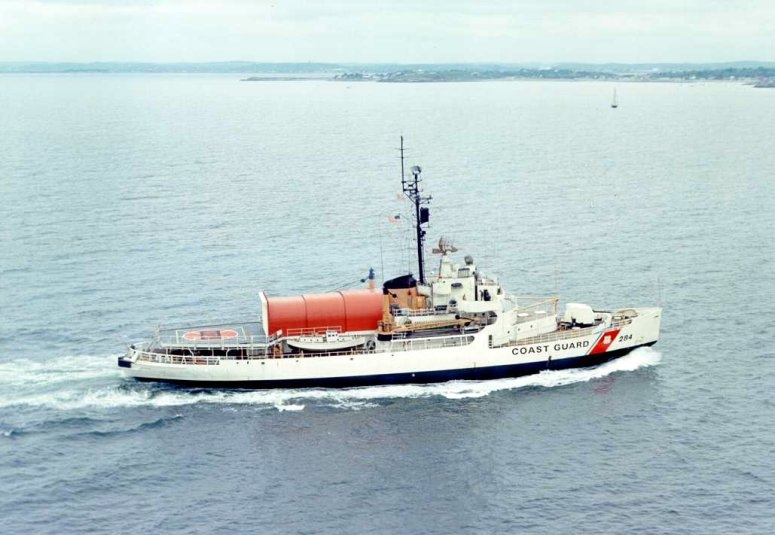
USCGC Edisto (WAGB-284)

- USCGC Staten Island (WAGB-278) ex-USS Staten Island (AGB-5)
- USCGC Eastwind (WAGB-279)
- USCGC Southwind (WAGB-280) ex-USS Atka (AGB-3)
- USCGC Westwind (WAGB 281)
- USCGC Northwind (WAGB-282)
- USCGC Burton Island (WAGB-283) ex-USS Burton Island (AG-88)
- USCGC Edisto (WAGB-284) ex-USS Edisto (AGB-2)

== 255' Owasco-class Cutter (WPG/WHEC) ==
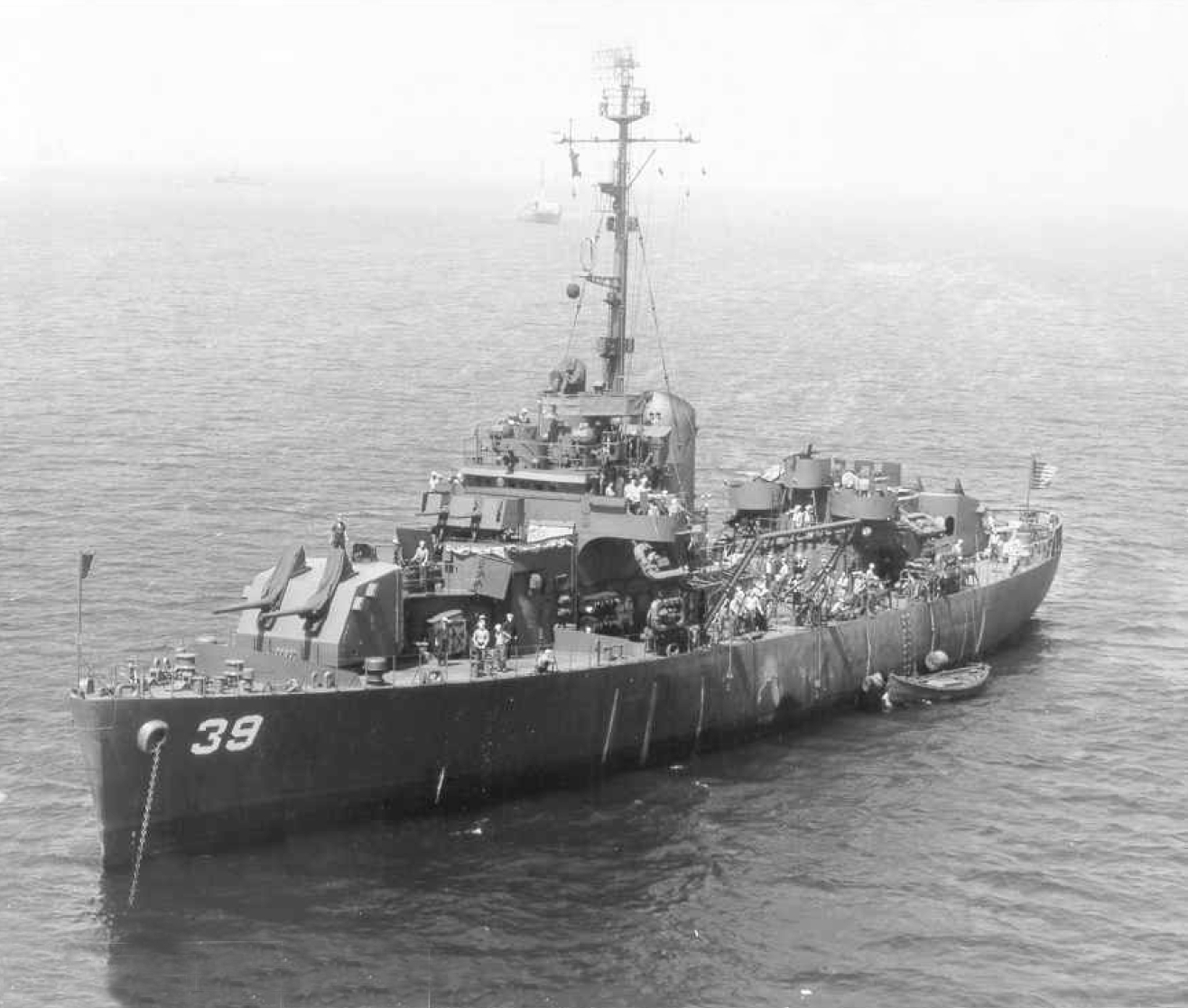
USCGC Owasco (WPG-39)

- USCGC Owasco (WHEC-39)
- USCGC Winnebago (WHEC-40)
- USCGC Chautauqua (WHEC-41)
- USCGC Sebago (WHEC-42)
- USCGC Iroquois (WHEC-43)
- USCGC Wachusett (WHEC-44)
- USCGC Escanaba (WHEC-64)
- USCGC Winona (WHEC-65)
- USCGC Klamath (WHEC-66)
- USCGC Minnetonka (WHEC-67)
- USCGC Androscoggin (WHEC-68)
- USCGC Mendota (WHEC-69)
- USCGC Pontchartrain (WHEC-70)

== 250' Lake-class Cutter ==
- USCGC Cayuga (1932); Later-HMS Totland (Y88); USCGC Mocoma (WPG-163)
- USCGC Champlain (1929); Later-HMS Sennen (Y21); USCGC Champlain (WPG-319)
- USCGC Chelan (1928); Later-HMS Lulworth (Y60)
- USCGC Itasca (1929); Later-HMS Gorleston (Y92); USCGC Itasca (WPG-321)
- USCGC Mendota (1929); Later-HMS Culver (Y87)
- USCGC Pontchartrain (1928); Later-HMS Hartland (Y00)
- USCGC Saranac (1930); Later-HMS Banff (Y43); USCGC Sebec (WPG-164); USCGC Tampa (WPG-164)
- USCGC Sebago (1930); Later-HMS Walney (Y04)
- USCGC Shoshone (1931); Later-HMS Landguard (Y56)
- USCGC Tahoe (1928); Later-HMS Fishguard (Y59)

== 240' Tampa-class Cutter ==
- USCGC Haida (WPG-45)
- USCGC Modoc (WPG-46)
- USCGC Mojave (WPG-47)
- USCGC Tampa (WPG-48)

== 240' Seagoing Buoy Tender Breaker (WLBB) ==
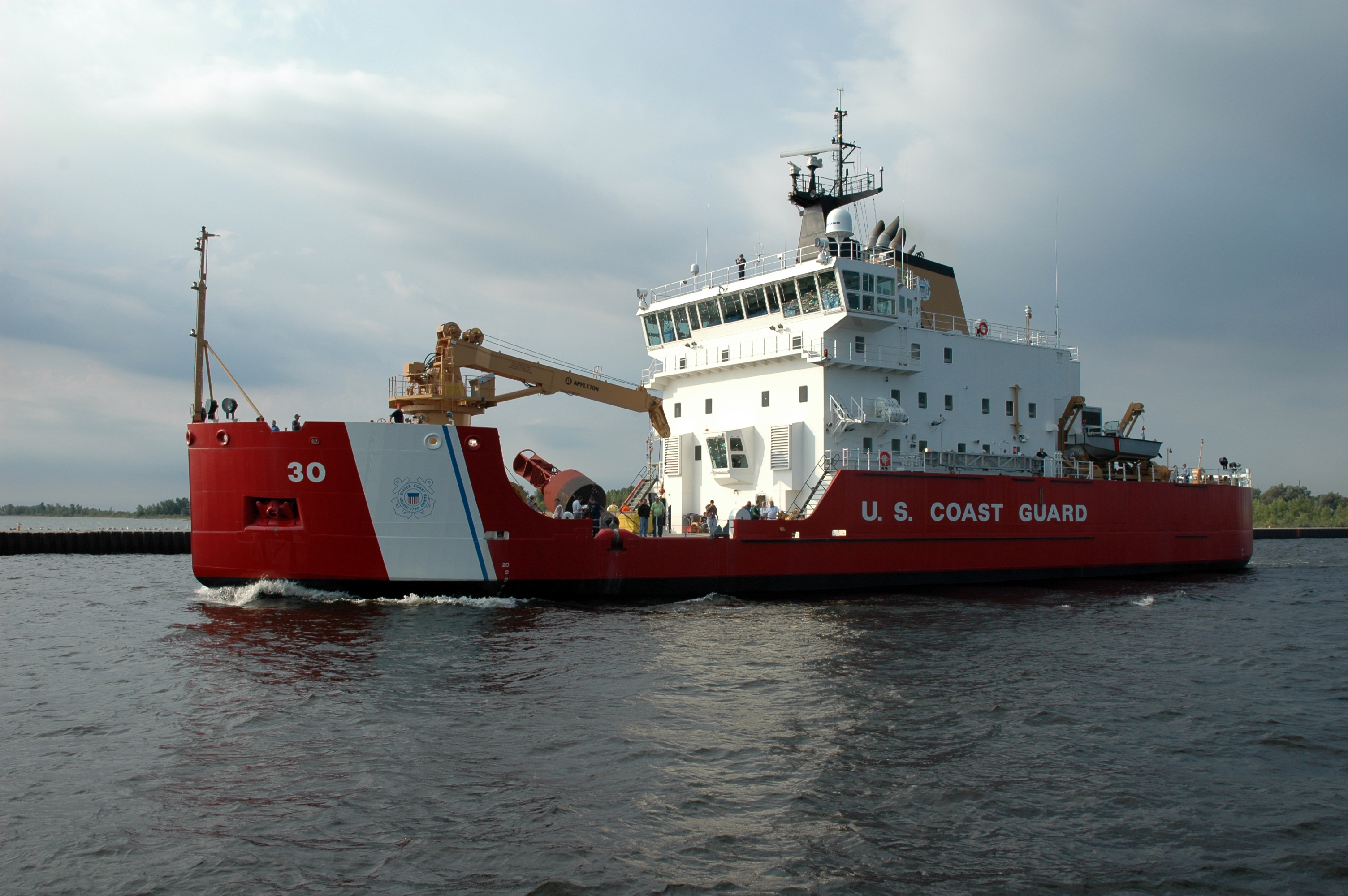
USCGC Mackinaw (WLBB-30)

- USCGC Mackinaw (WLBB-30)

== 230' Medium Endurance Cutter (WMEC) ==
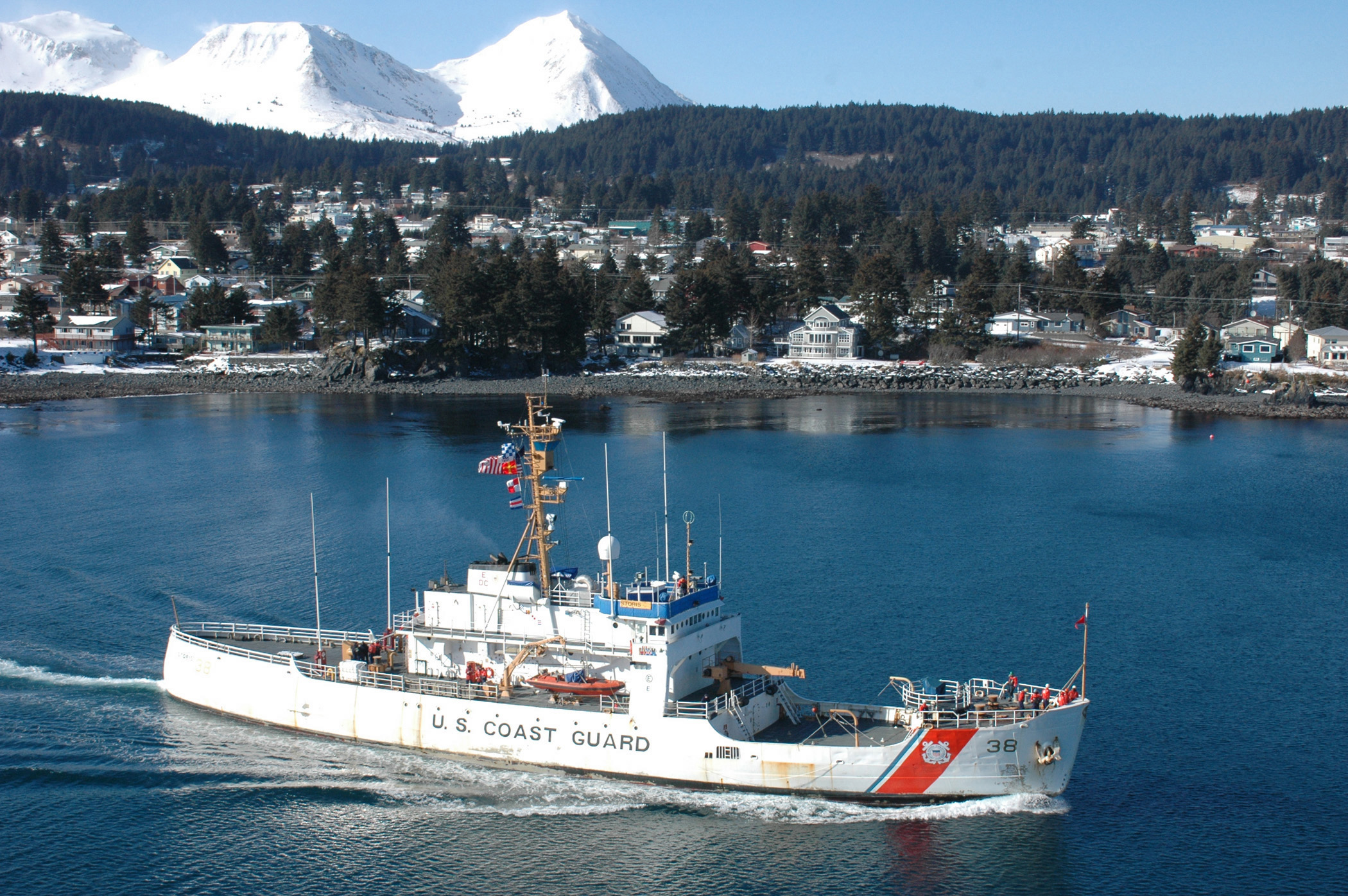
USCGC Storis (WMEC-38)

- USCGC Storis (WMEC-38)

== 225' Juniper-class Seagoing Buoy Tenders (WLB) ==
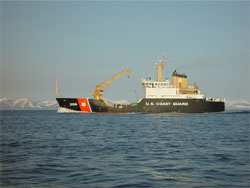
USCGC Spar (WLB-206), a USCG seagoing buoy tender

- USCGC Juniper (WLB-201)
- USCGC Willow (WLB-202)
- USCGC Kukui (WLB-203)
- USCGC Elm (WLB-204)
- USCGC Walnut (WLB-205)
- USCGC Spar (WLB-206)
- USCGC Maple (WLB-207)
- USCGC Aspen (WLB-208)
- USCGC Sycamore (WLB-209)
- USCGC Cypress (WLB-210)
- USCGC Oak (WLB-211)
- USCGC Hickory (WLB-212)
- USCGC Fir (WLB-213)
- USCGC Hollyhock (WLB-214)
- USCGC Sequoia (WLB-215)
- USCGC Alder (WLB-216)

== 213' Medium Endurance Cutter (WMEC) ==
213' Diver-class cutter (WAT)

- USCGC Acushnet (WMEC-167)
- USCGC Yocona (WMEC-168) (ex-Seize)
- USCGC Escape (WMEC-6)

== 210' Medium Endurance Cutter (WMEC) ==
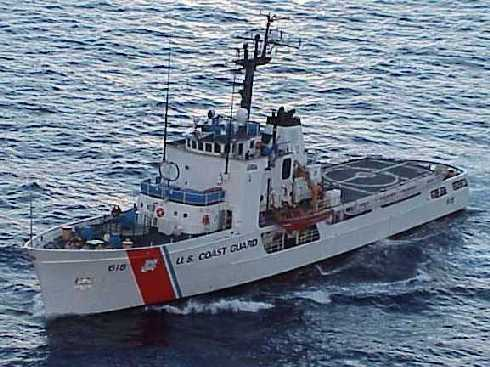
USCGC Reliance (WMEC-615), a Reliance class cutter

- USCGC Reliance (WMEC-615)
- USCGC Diligence (WMEC-616)
- USCGC Vigilant (WMEC-617)
- USCGC Active (WMEC-618)
- USCGC Confidence (WMEC-619)
- USCGC Resolute (WMEC-620)
- USCGC Valiant (WMEC-621)
- USCGC Courageous (WMEC-622)
- USCGC Steadfast (WMEC-623)
- USCGC Dauntless (WMEC-624)
- USCGC Venturous (WMEC-625)
- USCGC Dependable (WMEC-626)
- USCGC Vigorous (WMEC-627)
- USCGC Durable (WMEC-628)
- USCGC Decisive (WMEC-629)
- USCGC Alert (WMEC-630)

== 205' Cherokee/Navajo-class Auxiliary Tug (WAT) ==
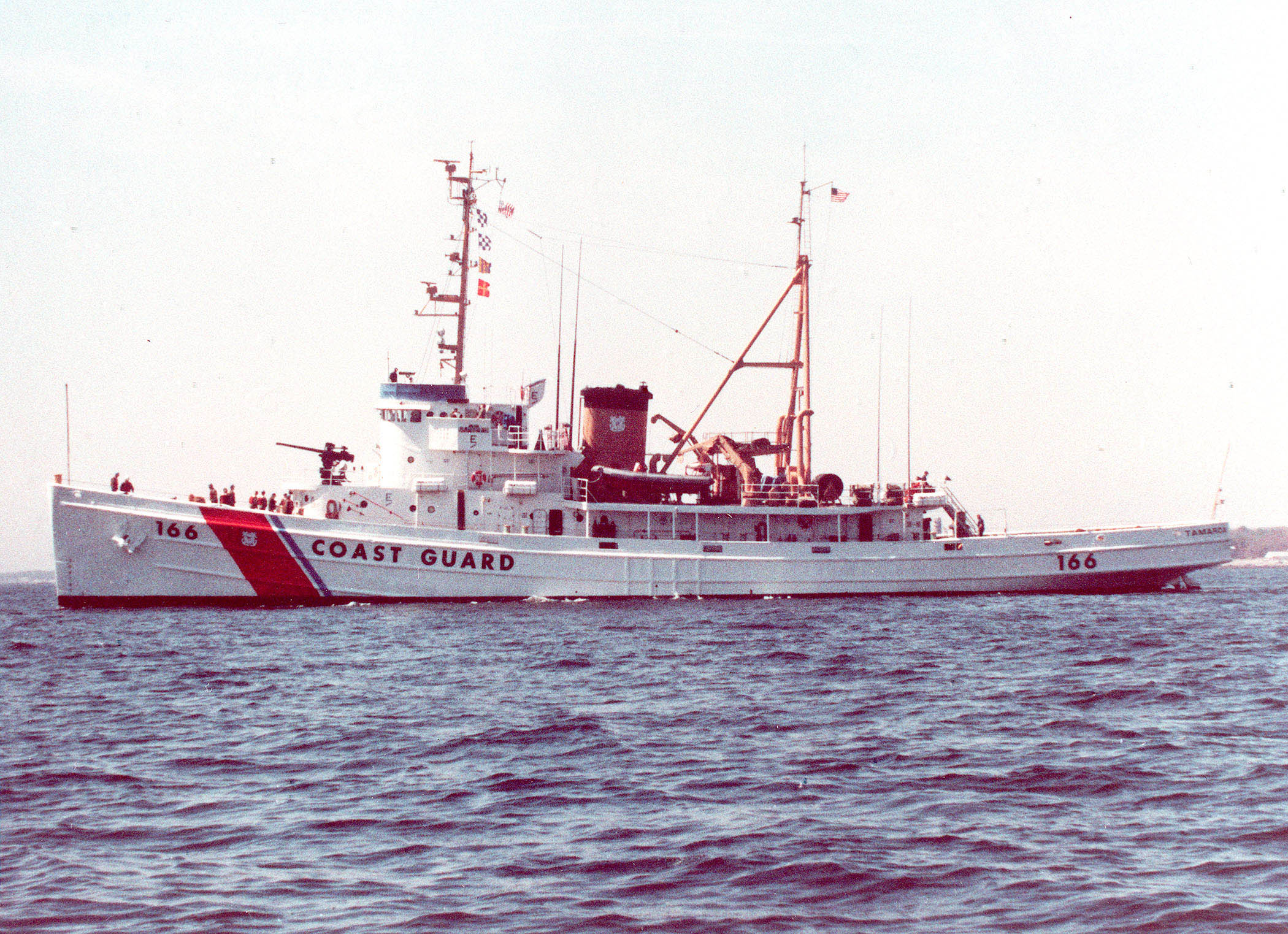
USCGC Tamaroa (WMEC-166)

- USCGC Ute (WMEC-76)
- USCGC Lipan (WMEC-85)
- USCGC Avoyel (WMEC-150)
- USCGC Chilula (WMEC-153)
- USCGC Cherokee (WMEC-165)
- USCGC Tamaroa (WMEC-166)

== 204' Seneca-class Revenue Cutter ==
- USCGC Seneca (1908)

== 200' Eagle-class Patrol Craft ==
- USCGC McGourty ex-Eagle No. 16
- USCGC Scally ex-Eagle No. 20
- USCGC Bothwell ex-Eagle No. 21
- USCGC Earp ex-Eagle No. 22
- USCGC Carr ex-Eagle No. 30

== 192' First Class Cruising Cutter ==
- USCGC Yamacraw (1909)

== 190' Miami class ==
- USCGC Tampa (1912)
- USCGC Unalga (WPG-53)

== 189' Seagoing Buoy Tenders (WLB) ==
- USCGC Magnolia (WLB-328)
- USCGC Ivy (WLB-329)
- USCGC Jonquil (WLB-330)
- USCGC Heather (WLB-331)
- USCGC Willow (WLB-332)
- USCGC Yamacraw (WLB-333)

== 188' First Class Cruising Cutter ==
- USCGC Seminole

== 187' Auxiliary Tug (WAT) ==
- USCGC Redwing (WAT-48) Former USN Lapwing-class minesweeper

== 180' Seagoing Buoy Tenders (WLB) ==
=== Class A (Cactus) ===
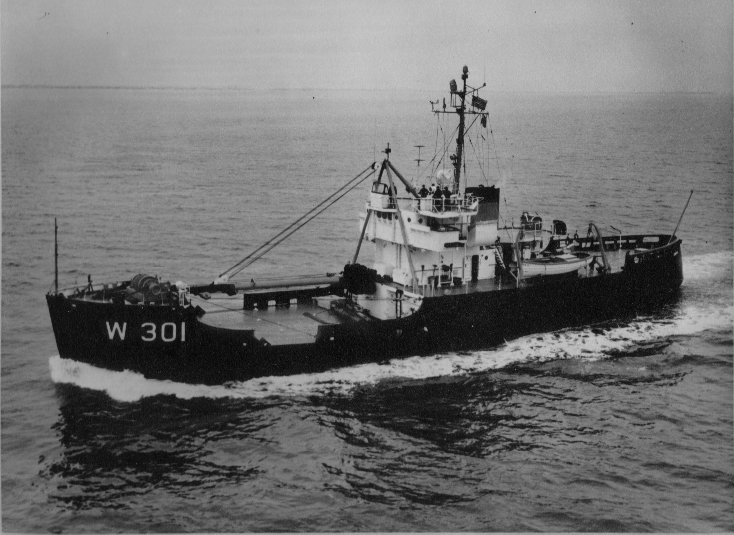
USCGC Conifer (WLB-301)

- USCGC Balsam (WLB-62)
- USCGC Cactus (WLB-270)
- USCGC Cowslip (WLB-277)
- USCGC Woodbine (WLB-289)
- USCGC Gentian (WLB-290)
- USCGC Laurel (WLB-291)
- USCGC Clover (WLB-292)
- USCGC Evergreen (WLB-295)
- USCGC Sorrel (WLB-296)
- USCGC Citrus (WLB-300)
- USCGC Conifer (WLB-301)
- USCGC Madrona (WLB-302)
- USCGC Tupelo (WLB-303)

=== Class B (Mesquite) ===
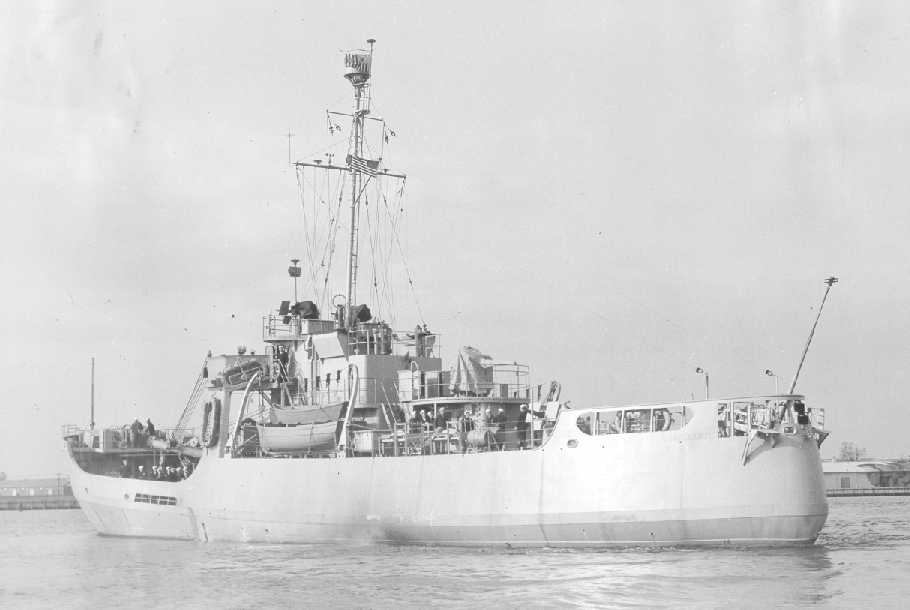
USCGC Mesquite (WLB-305)

- USCGC Ironwood (WLB-297)
- USCGC Mesquite (WLB-305)
- USCGC Buttonwood (WLB-306)
- USCGC Planetree (WLB-307)
- USCGC Papaw (WLB-308)
- USCGC Sweetgum (WLB-309)

=== Class C (Iris) ===
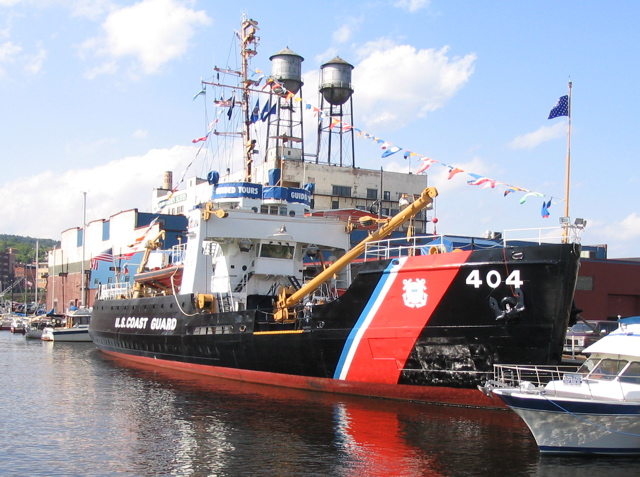
USCGC Sundew (WLB-404)

- USCGC Basswood (WLB-388)
- USCGC Bittersweet (WLB-389)
- USCGC Blackhaw (WLB-390)
- USCGC Blackthorn (WLB-391)
- USCGC Bramble (WLB-392)
- USCGC Firebush (WLB-393)
- USCGC Hornbeam (WLB-394)
- USCGC Iris (WLB-395)
- USCGC Mallow (WLB-396)
- USCGC Mariposa (WLB-397)
- USCGC Redbud (WLB-398)
- USCGC Sagebrush (WLB-399)
- USCGC Salvia (WLB-400)
- USCGC Sassafras (WLB-401)
- USCGC Sedge (WLB-402)
- USCGC Spar (WLB-403)
- USCGC Sundew (WLB-404)
- USCGC Sweetbrier (WLB-405)
- USCGC Acacia (WLB-406)
- USCGC Woodrush (WLB-407)

== 180' Oceanographic Vessel (WAGO) ==
- USCGC Evergreen (WAGO-295)

== 179' patrol coastal (WPC) ==
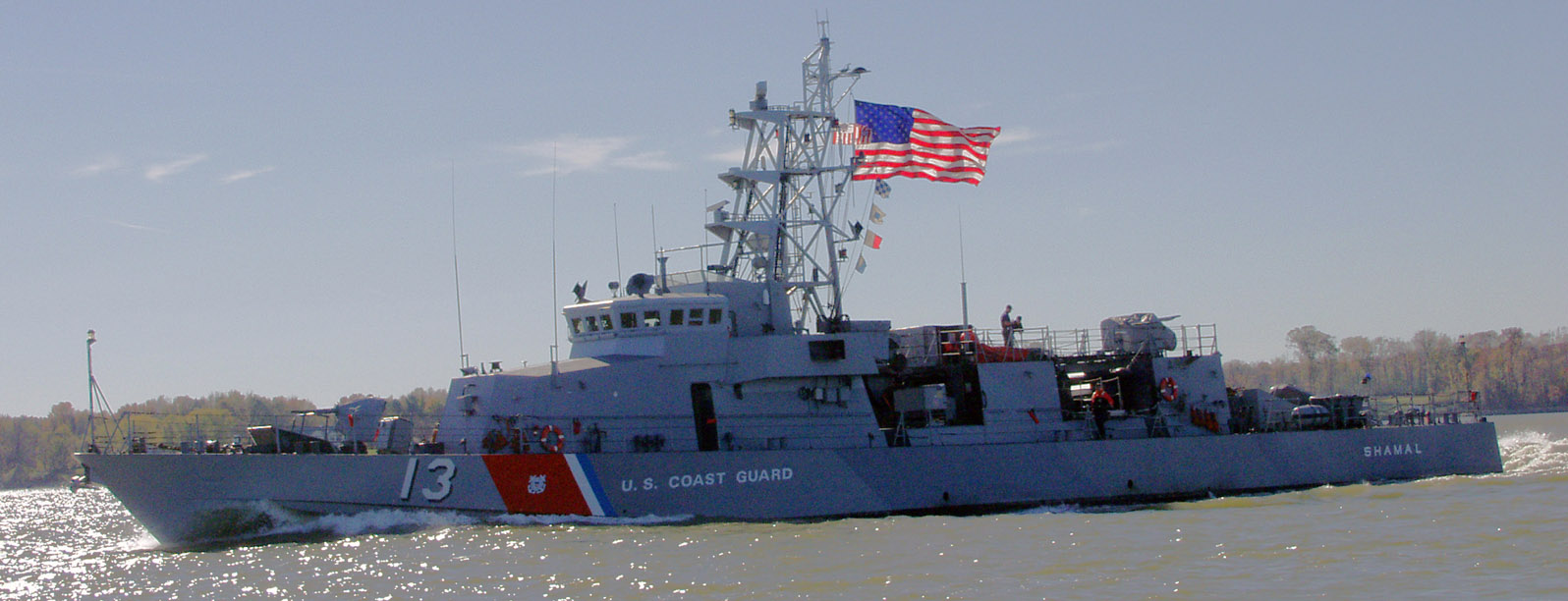
USCGC Shamal (WPC-13), a former USN Cyclone-class patrol ship

Cyclone-class patrol ships on loan from the United States Navy

- USCGC Tempest (WPC-2)
- USCGC Monsoon (WPC-4)
- USCGC Zephyr (WPC-8)
- USCGC Shamal (WPC-13)
- USCGC Tornado (WPC-14)

== 178' first class cruising cutter ==
- USCGC Tuscarora (1902)

== 176' cargo vessel (WAK) ==
- USCGC Nettle (WAK-169)
- USCGC Trillium (WAK-170)

== 175' Hollyhock-class buoy tender (WLM) ==
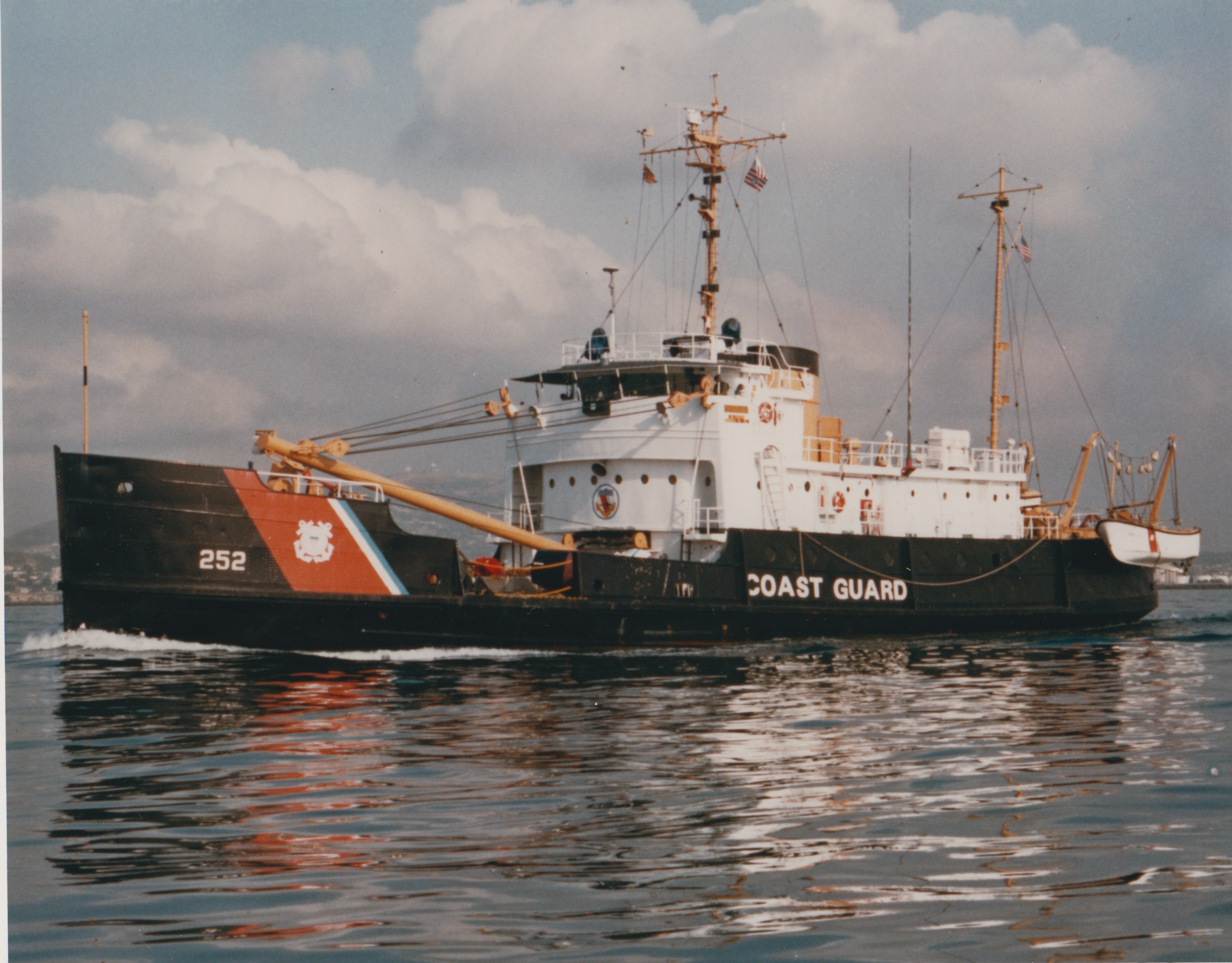
USCGC Walnut (WLM-252)

- USCGC Fir (WLM-212)
- USCGC Hollyhock (WLM-220)
- USCGC Walnut (WLM-252)

== 175' Keeper-class coastal buoy tender (WLM) ==
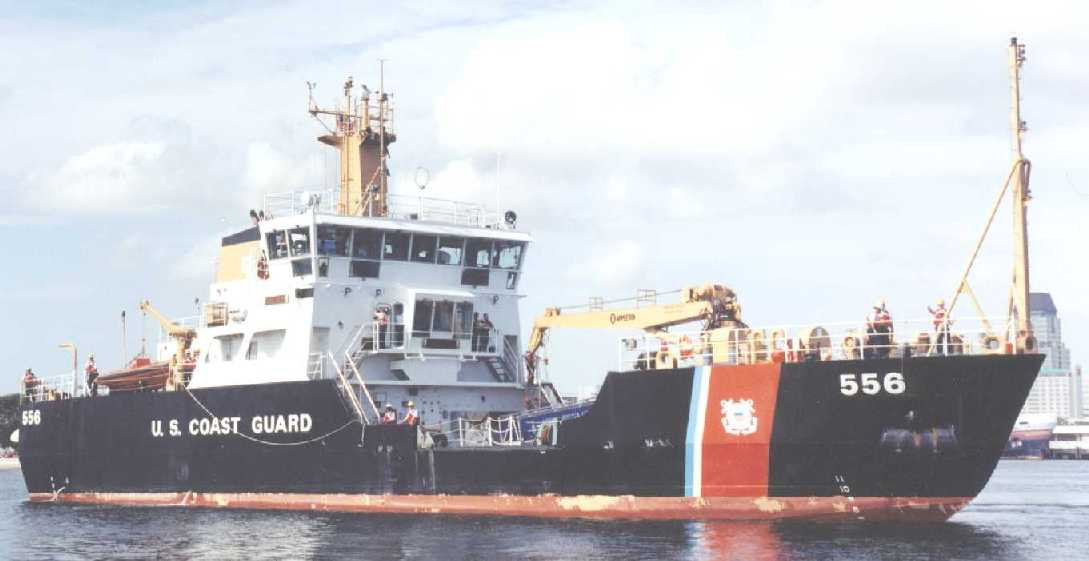
USCGC Joshua Appleby (WLM-556), a 175' USCG coastal buoy tender

- USCGC Ida Lewis (WLM-551)
- USCGC Katherine Walker (WLM-552)
- USCGC Abbie Burgess (WLM-553)
- USCGC Marcus Hanna (WLM-554)
- USCGC James Rankin (WLM-555)
- USCGC Joshua Appleby (WLM-556)
- USCGC Frank Drew (WLM-557)
- USCGC Anthony Petit (WLM-558)
- USCGC Barbara Mabrity (WLM-559)
- USCGC William Tate (WLM-560)
- USCGC Harry Claiborne (WLM-561)
- USCGC Maria Bray (WLM-562)
- USCGC Henry Blake (WLM-563)
- USCGC George Cobb (WLM-564)

== 173' Magnolia-class bay and sound tender (WAGL) ==
- USCGC Kukui (WAGL-225)
- USCGC Magnolia (WAGL-231)
- USCGC Mistletoe (WAGL-237)
- USCGC Ivy (WAGL-)

== 171' first class cruising cutter ==
- USCGC Comanche (1915)

== 166' Tallapoosa class ==
- USCGC Ossipee (WPR-50)
- USCGC Tallapoosa (WPG-52)

== 165' Algonquin-class patrol boat (WPG) ==
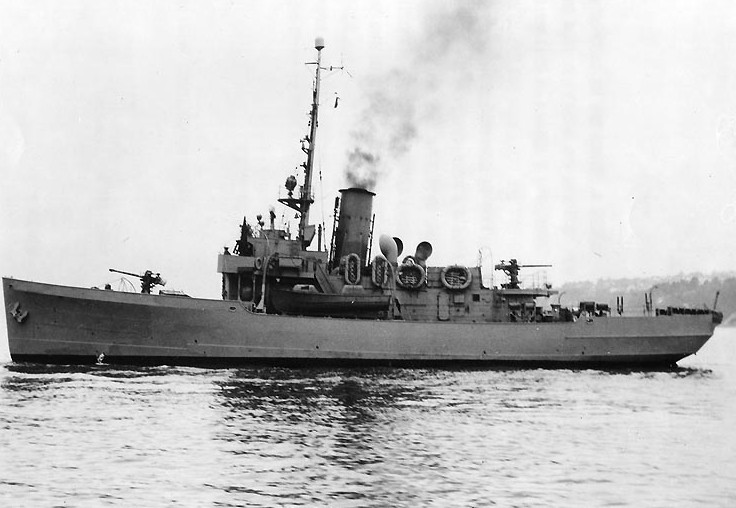
USCGC Onondaga (WPG-79)

Also known as 165-foot (A) patrol craft

- USCGC Algonquin (WPG-75)
- USCGC Comanche (WPG-76)
- USCGC Escanaba (WPG-77)
- USCGC Mohawk (WPG-78)
- USCGC Onondaga (WPG-79)
- USCGC Tahoma (WPG-80)

== 165' Thetis-class patrol boat (WPC) ==
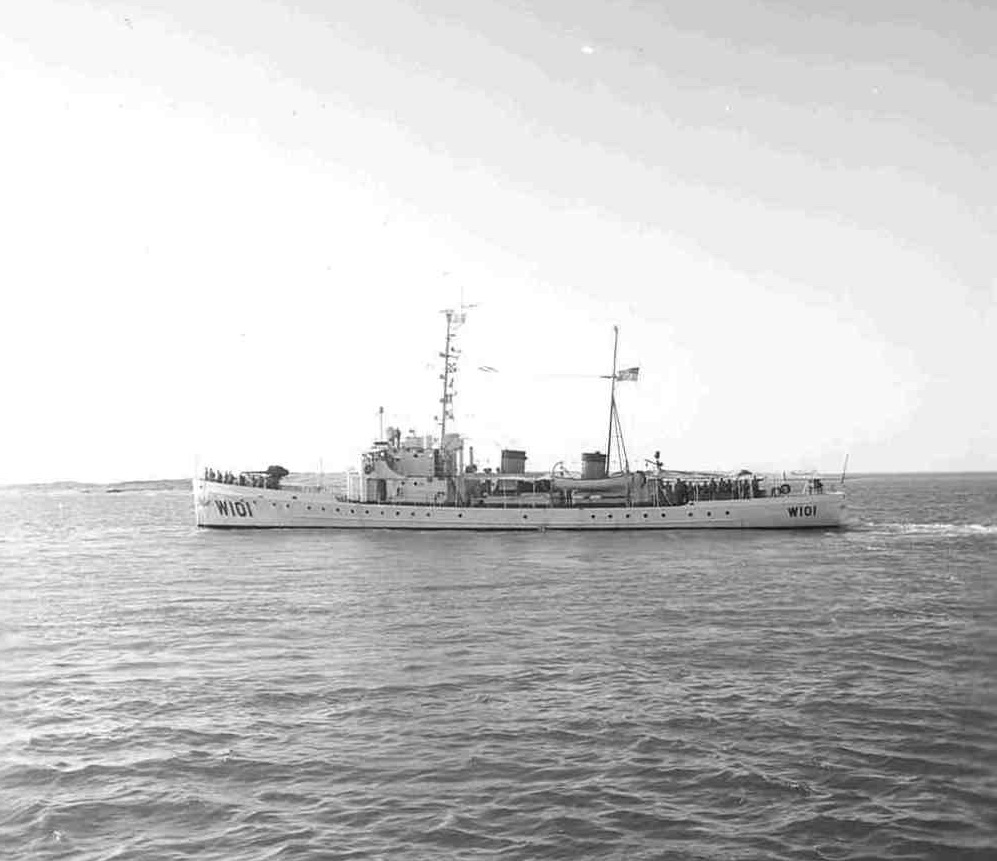
USCGC Ariadne (WPC-101)

Also known as 165-foot (B) patrol craft

- USCGC Argo (WPC-100)
- USCGC Ariadne (WPC-101)
- USCGC Atalanta (WPC-102)
- USCGC Aurora (WPC-103)
- USCGC Calypso (WPC-104)
- USCGC Cyane (WPC-105)
- USCGC Daphne (WPC-106)
- USCGC Dione (WPC-107)
- USCGC Electra (WPC-187)
- USCGC Galatea (WPC-108)
- USCGC Hermes (WPC-109)
- USCGC Icarus (WPC-110)
- USCGC Nemesis (WPC-111)
- USCGC Nike (WPC-112)
- USCGC Pandora (WPC-113)
- USCGC Perseus (WPC-114)
- USCGC Thetis (WPC-115)
- USCGC Triton (WPC-116)

== 160' inland construction tender (WLIC) ==
- USCGC Pamlico (WLIC-800)
- USCGC Hudson (WLIC-801)
- USCGC Kennebec (WLIC-802)
- USCGC Saginaw (WLIC-803)

== 158' auxiliary tug (WAT) ==
- USCGC Shawnee (WAT-54)

== 157' Red-class coastal buoy tender (WLM) ==
- USCGC Red Wood (WLM-685)
- USCGC Red Beech (WLM-686)
- USCGC Red Birch (WLM-687)
- USCGC Red Cedar (WLM-688)
- USCGC Red Oak (WLM-689)

== 154' Sentinel-class Fast Response Cutter (WPC) ==
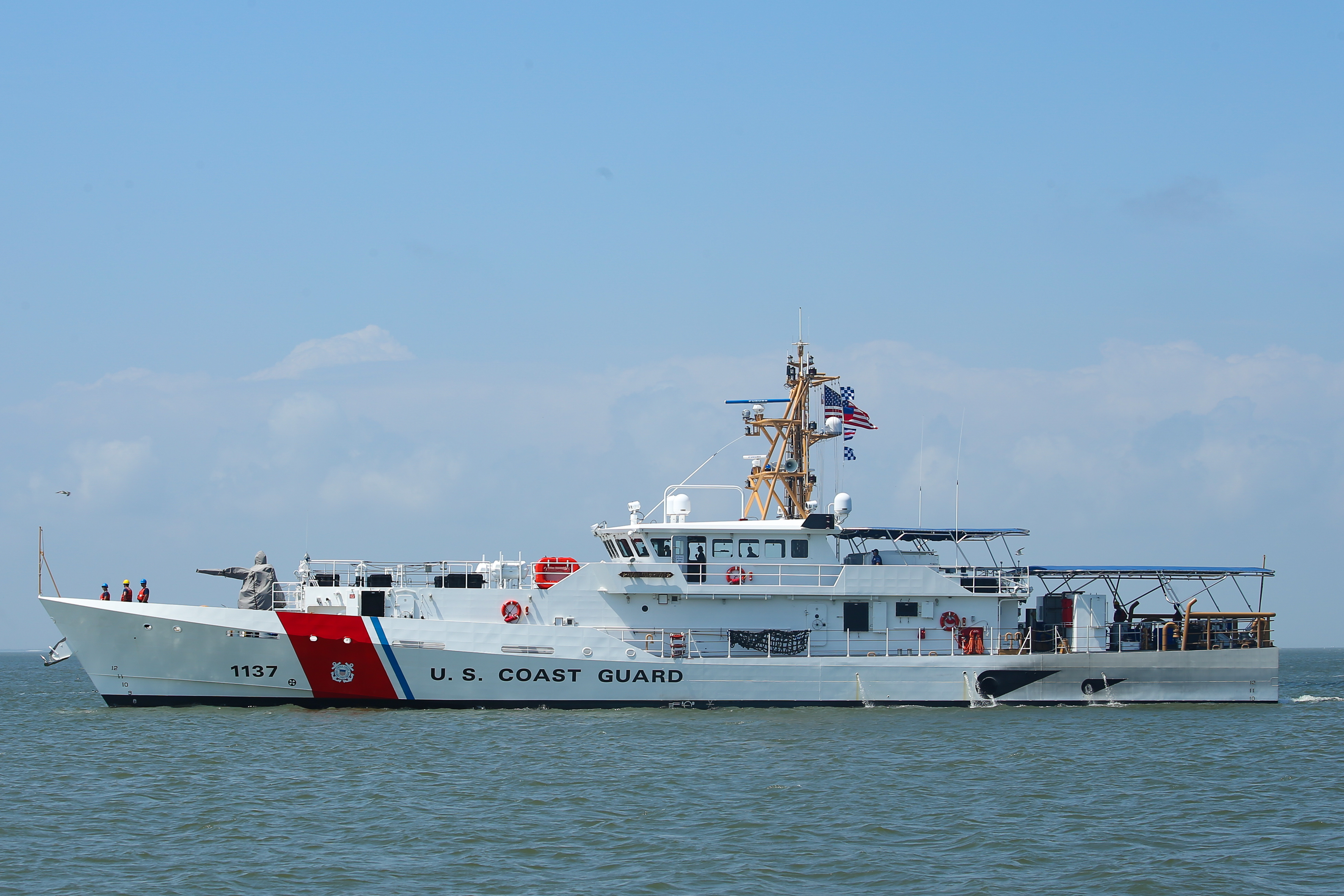
USCGC Edgar Culbertson (WPC-1137)

- USCGC Bernard C. Webber (WPC-1101)
- USCGC Richard Etheridge (WPC-1102)
- USCGC William Flores (WPC-1103)
- USCGC Robert Yered (WPC-1104)
- USCGC Margaret Norvell (WPC-1105)
- USCGC Paul Clark (WPC-1106)
- USCGC Charles David (WPC-1107)
- USCGC Charles Sexton (WPC-1108)
- USCGC Kathleen Moore (WPC-1109)
- USCGC Raymond Evans (WPC-1110)
- USCGC William Trump (WPC-1111)
- USCGC Isaac Mayo (WPC-1112)
- USCGC Richard Dixon (WPC-1113)
- USCGC Heriberto Hernandez (WPC-1114)
- USCGC Joseph Napier (WPC-1115)
- USCGC Winslow Griesser (WPC-1116)
- USCGC Donald Horsley (WPC-1117)
- USCGC Joseph Tezanos (WPC-1118)
- USCGC Rollin Fritch (WPC-1119)
- USCGC Lawrence Lawson (WPC-1120)
- USCGC John McCormick (WPC-1121)
- USCGC Bailey Barco (WPC-1122)
- USCGC Benjamin Dailey (WPC-1123)
- USCGC Oliver Berry (WPC-1124)
- USCGC Jacob Poroo (WPC-1125)
- USCGC Joseph Gerczak (WPC-1126)
- USCGC Richard Snyder (WPC-1127)
- USCGC Nathan Bruckenthal (WPC-1128)
- USCGC Forrest Rednour (WPC-1129)
- USCGC Robert Ward (WPC-1130)
- USCGC Terrell Horne (WPC-1131)
- USCGC Benjamin Bottoms (WPC-1132)
- USCGC Joseph Doyle (WPC-1133)
- USCGC William Hart (WPC-1134)
- USCGC Angela McShan (WPC-1135)
- USCGC Daniel Tarr (WPC-1136)
- USCGC Edgar Culbertson (WPC-1137)
- USCGC Harold Miller (WPC-1138)
- USCGC Myrtle Hazard (WPC-1139)
- USCGC Oliver Henry (WPC-1140)
- USCGC Charles Moulthrope (WPC-1141)
- USCGC Robert Goldman (WPC-1142)
- USCGC Frederick Hatch (WPC-1143)
- USCGC Glen Harris (WPC-1144)
- USCGC Emlen Tunnell (WPC-1145)
- USCGC John Scheuerman (WPC-1146)
- USCGC Clarence Sutphin Jr. (WPC-1147)
- USCGC Pablo Valent (WPC-1148)
- USCGC Douglas Denman (WPC-1149)
- USCGC William Chadwick (WPC-1150)
- USCGC Warren Deyampert (WPC-1151)
- USCGC Maurice Jester (WPC-1152)
- USCGC John Patterson (WPC-1153)
- USCGC William Sparling (WPC-1154)
- USCGC Melvin Bell (WPC-1155)
- USCGC David Duren (WPC-1156)
- USCGC Florence Finch (WPC-1157)
- USCGC John Witherspoon (WPC-1158)
- USCGC Earl Cunningham (WPC-1159)
- USCGC Frederick Mann (WPC-1160)
- USCGC Olivia Hooker (WPC-1161)
- USCGC Vincent Danz (WPC-1162)
- USCGC Jeffrey Palazzo (WPC-1163)

== 152' seagoing tug ==
- USCGC Snohomish (1908)

== 143' auxiliary tug (WATA) ==
- USCGC Modoc (WATA-194) - Redesignated USCGC Modoc (WMEC-194)
- USCGC Comanche (WATA-202) - Redesignated USCGC Comanche (WMEC-202)

== 140' Bay-class icebreaking tug (WTGB) ==
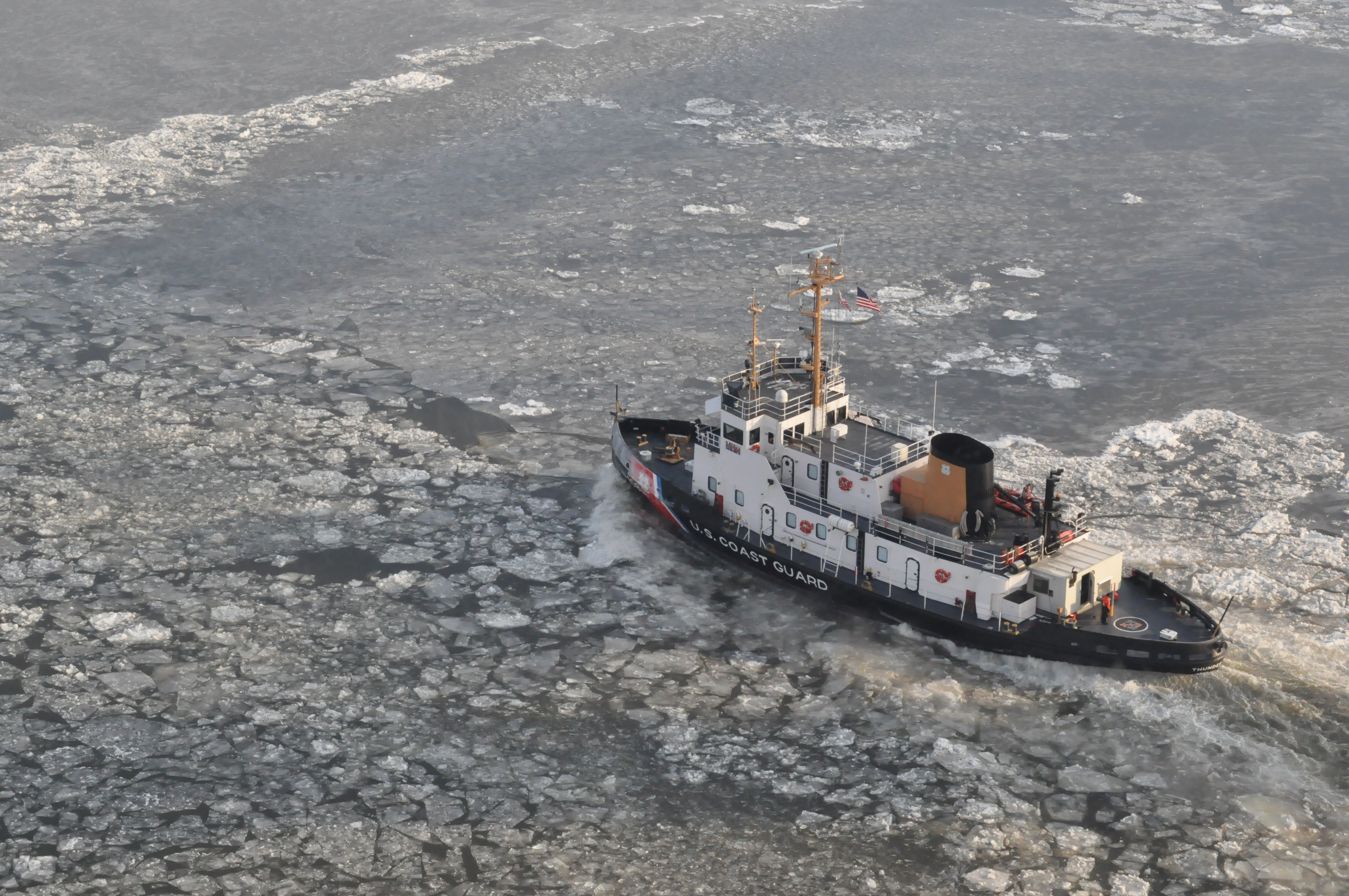
The U.S. Coast Guard cutter Thunder Bay (WTGB-108) clears a channel for vessels to navigate the frozen Hudson River

- USCGC Katmai Bay (WTGB-101)
- USCGC Bristol Bay (WTGB-102)
- USCGC Mobile Bay (WTGB-103)
- USCGC Biscayne Bay (WTGB-104)
- USCGC Neah Bay (WTGB-105)
- USCGC Morro Bay (WTGB-106)
- USCGC Penobscot Bay (WTGB-107)
- USCGC Thunder Bay (WTGB-108)
- USCGC Sturgeon Bay (WTGB-109)

== 133' White-class coastal buoy tender (WAGL/WLM) ==
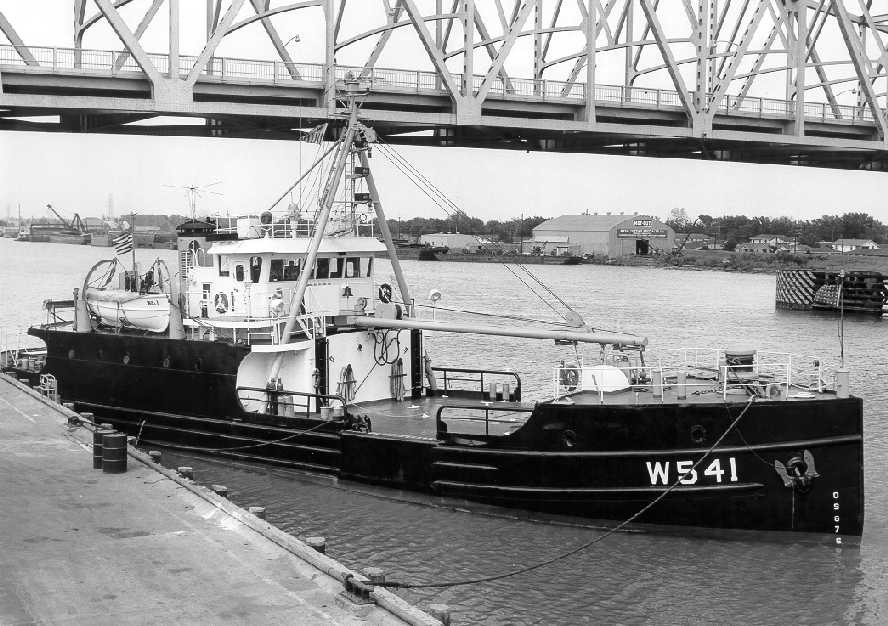
USCGC White Alder (WLM-541), a 133' USCG coastal buoy tender

- USCGC White Sumac (WLM-540)
- USCGC White Alder (WLM-541)
- USCGC White Bush (WLM-542)
- USCGC White Holly (WLM-543)
- USCGC White Sage (WLM-544)
- USCGC White Heath (WLM-545)
- USCGC White Lupine (WLM-546)
- USCGC White Pine (WLM-547)

== 125' Active-class patrol boat (WSC) ==
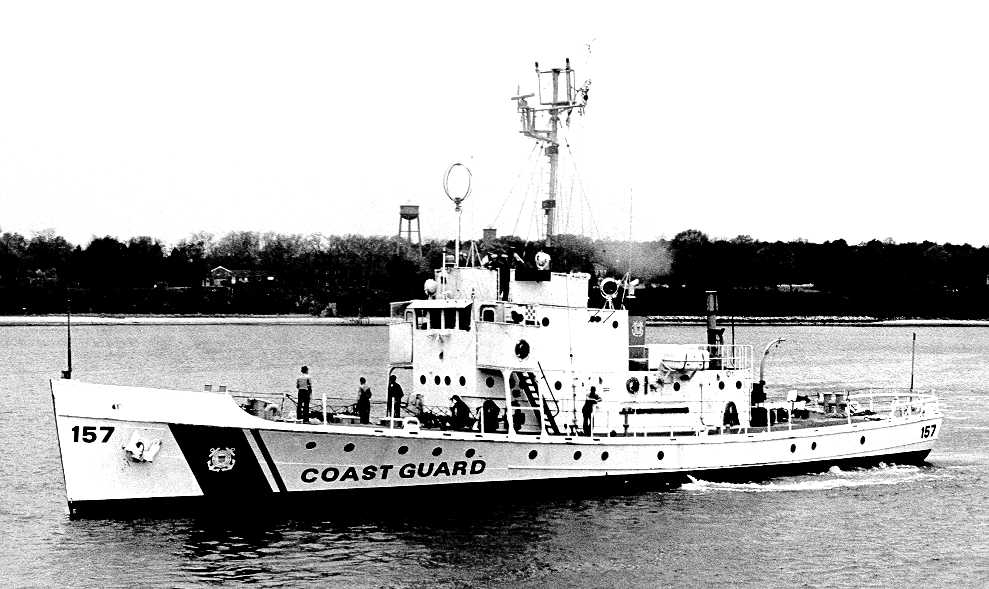
USCGC Cuyahoga (WIX-157)

- USCGC Active (WSC-125)
- USCGC Agassiz (WSC-126)
- USCGC Alert (WSC-127)
- USCGC Bedloe (WSC-128)
- USCGC Bonham (WSC-129)
- USCGC Boutwell (WSC-130)
- USCGC Cahoone (WSC-131)
- USCGC Cartigan (WSC-132)
- USCGC Colfax (WSC-133)
- USCGC Crawford (WSC-134)
- USCGC Diligence (WSC-135)
- USCGC Dix (WSC-136)
- USCGC Ewing (WSC-137)
- USCGC Faunce (WSC-138)
- USCGC Frederick Lee (WSC-139)
- USCGC General Greene (WPC-140)
- USCGC Harriet Lane (WSC-141)
- USCGC Jackson (WSC-142)
- USCGC Kimball (WSC-143)
- USCGC Legare (WSC-144)
- USCGC Marion (WSC-145)
- USCGC McLane (WSC-146)
- USCGC Morris (WSC-147)
- USCGC Nemaha (WSC-148)
- USCGC Pulaski (WSC-149)
- USCGC Reliance (WSC-150)
- USCGC Rush (WSC-151)
- USCGC Tiger (WSC-152)
- USCGC Travis (WSC-153)
- USCGC Vigilant (WSC-154)
- USCGC Woodbury (WSC-155)
- USCGC Yeaton (WSC-156)
- USCGC Cuyahoga (WIX-157)

== 123' patrol boat (WPB) ==
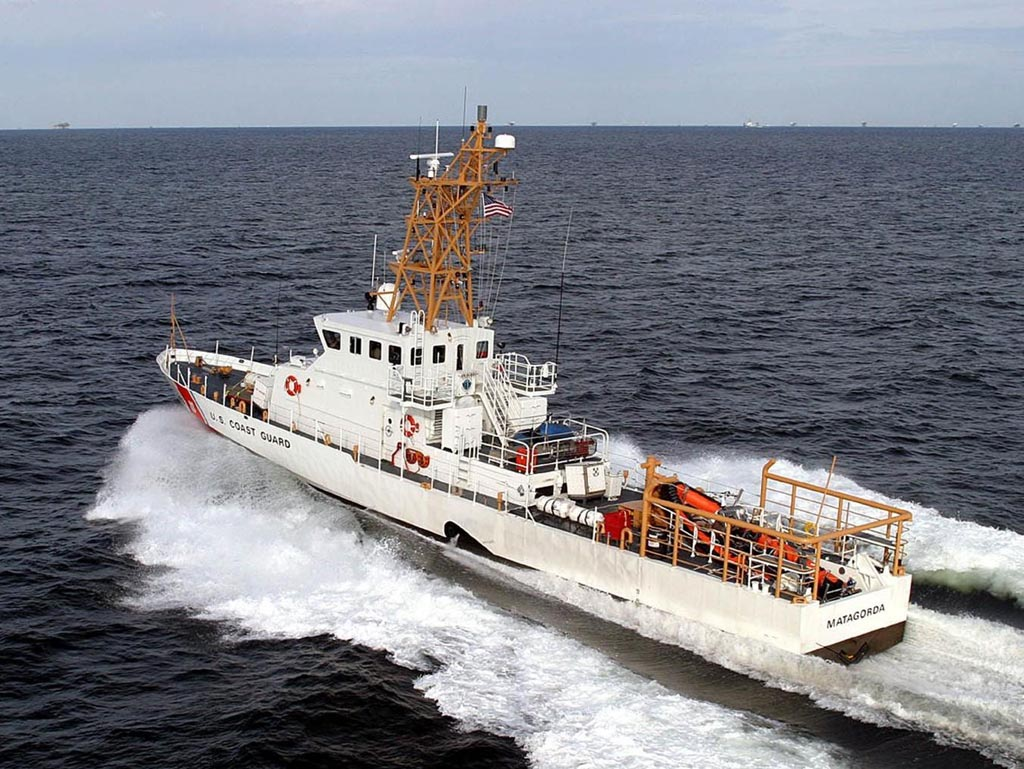
USCGC Matagorda (WPB-1303), a 123' converted Island-class patrol boat

- USCGC Manitou (WPB-1302)
- USCGC Matagorda (WPB-1303)
- USCGC Monhegan (WPB-1305)
- USCGC Nunivak (WPB-1306)
- USCGC Vashon (WPB-1308)
- USCGC Attu (WPB-1317)
- USCGC Metompkin (WPB-1325)
- USCGC Padre (WPB-1328)

== 113' Sycamore class (WAGL) ==
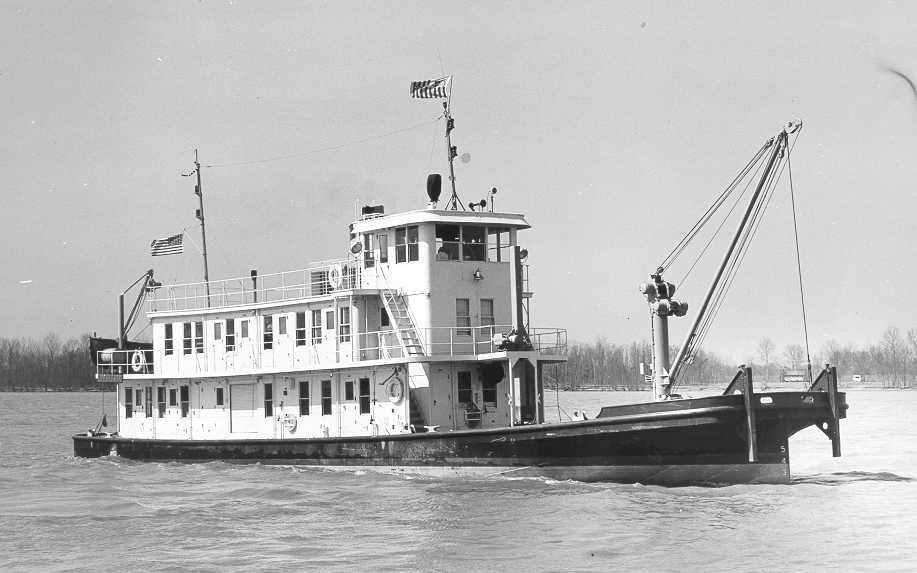
USCGC Forsythia (WAGL-63)

- USCGC Dogwood (WAGL-259)
- USCGC Forsythia (WAGL-63)
- USCGC Sycamore (WAGL-268)

== 111' Air class (WAVR) ==
- USCGC Air Brant (WAVR-412)
- USCGC Air Cardinal (WAVR-413)
- USCGC Air Condor (WAVR-414)
- USCGC Air Cormorant (WAVR-415)
- USCGC Air Crane (WAVR-416)
- USCGC Air Curlew (WAVR-417)
- USCGC Air Drake (WAVR-418)
- USCGC Air Eider (WAVR-419)
- USCGC Air Egret (WAVR-420)
- USCGC Air Falcon (WAVR-421)
- USCGC Air Finch (WAVR-422)
- USCGC Air Gannet (WAVR-423)
- USCGC Air Goose (WAVR-424)
- USCGC Air Grayleg (WAVR-425)
- USCGC Air Grebe (WAVR-426)
- USCGC Air Hawk (WAVR-428)
- USCGC Air Heron (WAVR-429)
- USCGC Air Ibis (WAVR-430)
- USCGC Air Jay (WAVR-431)
- USCGC Air Kestrel (WAVR-432)
- USCGC Air Killdeer (WAVR-433)
- USCGC Air Lapwing (WAVR-434)
- USCGC Air Ester (WAVR-435)
- USCGC Air Loon (WAVR-436)
- USCGC Air Mallard (WAVR-437)
- USCGC Air Martin (WAVR-438)
- USCGC Air Merlin (WAVR-439)
- USCGC Air Oriole (WAVR-440)
- USCGC Air Owl (WAVR-441)
- USCGC Air Parakeet (WAVR-442)
- USCGC Air Partridge (WAVR-443)
- USCGC Air Petrel (WAVR-444)
- USCGC Air Peacock (WAVR-445)
- USCGC Air Pelican (WAVR-446)
- USCGC Air Penguin (WAVR-447)
- USCGC Air Petrel (WAVR-448)
- USCGC Air Pheasant (WAVR-449)
- USCGC Air Phoebe (WAVR-450)
- USCGC Air Pigeon (WAVR-451)
- USCGC Air Pipit (WAVR-452)
- USCGC Air Piper (WAVR-453)
- USCGC Air Puffin (WAVR-454)
- USCGC Air Quail (WAVR-455)
- USCGC Air Raven (WAVR-456)
- USCGC Air Redwing (WAVR-457)
- USCGC Air Robin (WAVR-458)
- USCGC Air Rook (WAVR-459)
- USCGC Air Ruff (WAVR-460)
- USCGC Air Sheldrake (WAVR-461)
- USCGC Air Shrike (WAVR-462)
- USCGC Air Skimmer (WAVR-463)
- USCGC Air Skylark (WAVR-464)
- USCGC Air Snipe (WAVR-465)
- USCGC Air Sparrow (WAVR-466)
- USCGC Air Starling (WAVR-467)
- USCGC Air Stork (WAVR-468)
- USCGC Air Swallow (WAVR-469)
- USCGC Air Swan (WAVR-470)
- USCGC Air Swift (WAVR-471)
- USCGC Air Tanager (WAVR-472)
- USCGC Air Teal (WAVR-473)
- USCGC Air Tern (WAVR-474)
- USCGC Air Thrush (WAVR-475)
- USCGC Air Toucan (WAVR-476)
- USCGC Air Warbler (WAVR-477)
- USCGC Air Waxwing (WAVR-478)
- USCGC Air Willet (WAVR-479)
- USCGC Air Wren (WAVR-480)
- USCGC Air Scaup (WAVR-481)
- USCGC Air Scoter (WAVR-482)

== 110' surface effect ship (WSES) ==
- USCGC Dorado (WSES-1)
- USCGC Sea Hawk (WSES-2)
- USCGC Shearwater (WSES-3)
- USCGC Petrel (WSES-4)

== 110' Island-class patrol boat (WPB) ==
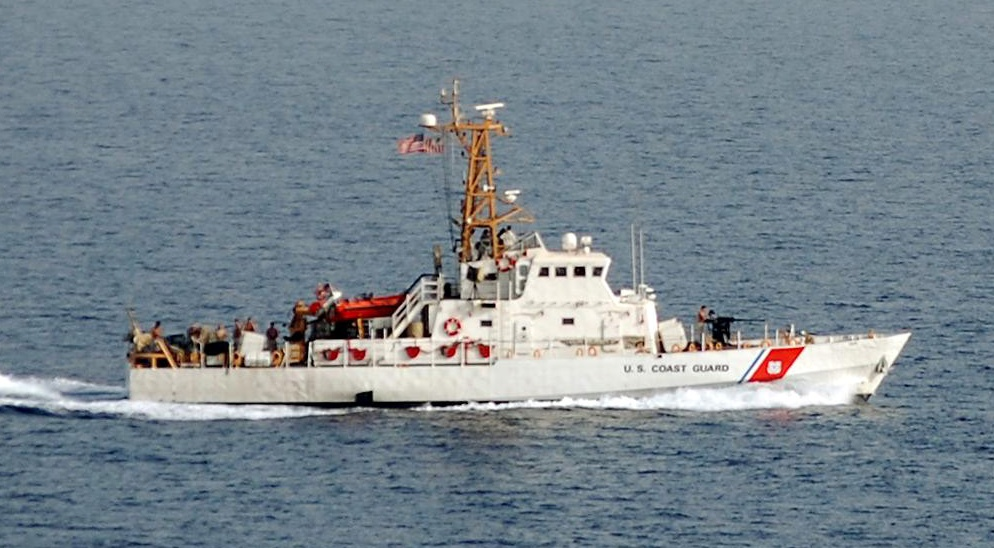
USCGC Maui (WPB-1304)

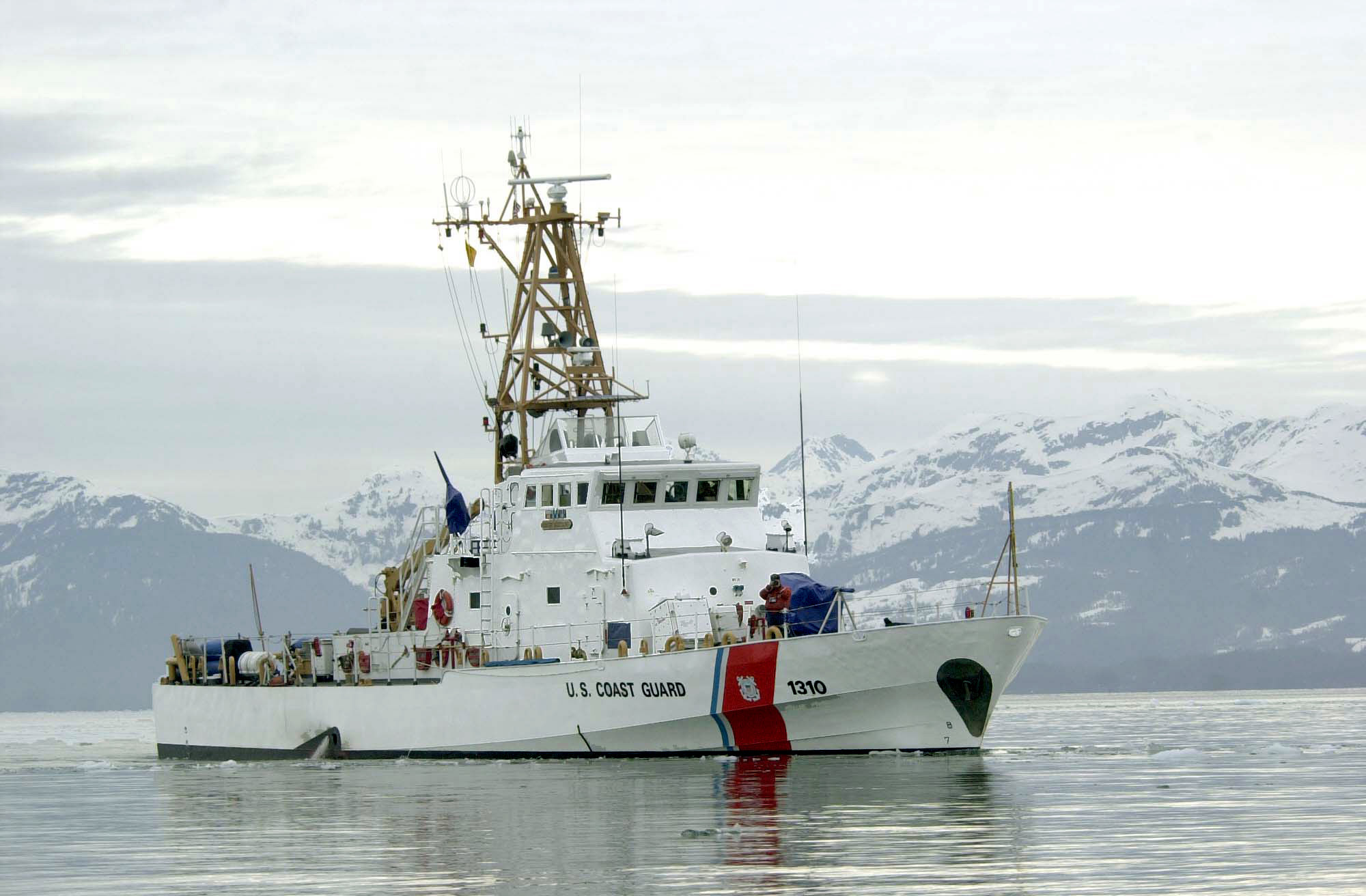
USCGC Mustang (WPB-1310)

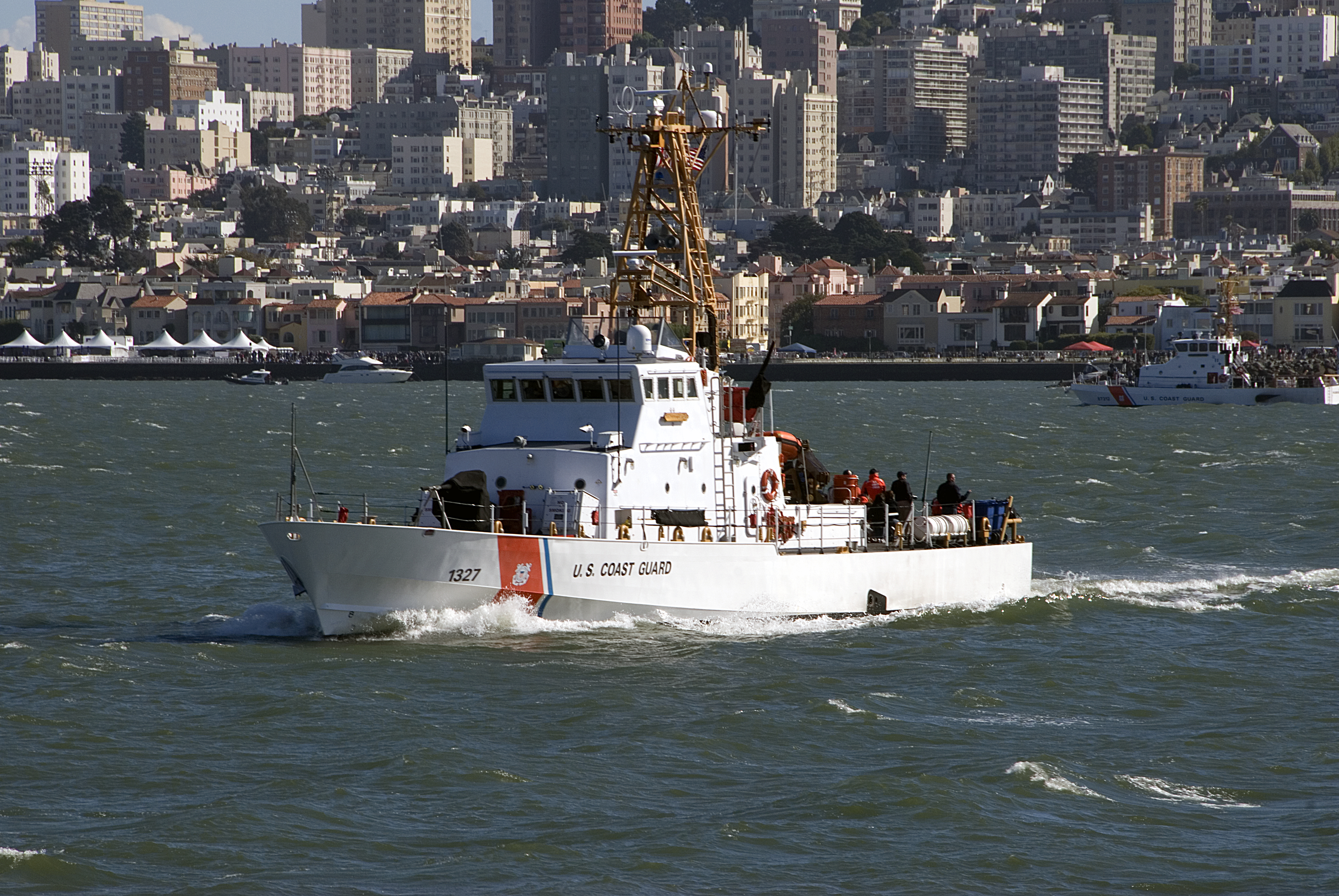
USCGC Orcas (WPB-1327)

- USCGC Farallon (WPB-1301)
- USCGC Manitou (WPB-1302)
- USCGC Matagorda (WPB-1303)
- USCGC Maui (WPB-1304)
- USCGC Ocracoke (WPB-1307)
- USCGC Aquidneck (WPB-1309)
- USCGC Mustang (WPB-1310)
- USCGC Naushon (WPB-1311)
- USCGC Sanibel (WPB-1312)
- USCGC Edisto (WPB-1313)
- USCGC Sapelo (WPB-1314)
- USCGC Matinicus (WPB-1315)
- USCGC Nantucket (WPB-1316)
- USCGC Baranof (WPB-1318)
- USCGC Chandeleur (WPB-1319)
- USCGC Chincoteague (WPB-1320)
- USCGC Cushing (WPB-1321)
- USCGC Cuttyhunk (WPB-1322)
- USCGC Drummond (WPB-1323)
- USCGC Key Largo (WPB-1324)
- USCGC Metompkin (WPB-1325)
- USCGC Monomoy (WPB-1326)
- USCGC Orcas (WPB-1327)
- USCGC Sitkinak (WPB-1329)
- USCGC Tybee (WPB-1330)
- USCGC Washington (WPB-1331)
- USCGC Wrangell (WPB-1332)
- USCGC Adak (WPB-1333)
- USCGC Liberty (WPB-1334)
- USCGC Anacapa (WPB-1335)
- USCGC Kiska (WPB-1336)
- USCGC Assateague (WPB-1337)
- USCGC Grand Isle (WPB-1338)
- USCGC Key Biscayne (WPB-1339)
- USCGC Jefferson Island (WPB-1340)
- USCGC Kodiak Island (WPB-1341)
- USCGC Long Island (WPB-1342)
- USCGC Bainbridge Island (WPB-1343)
- USCGC Block Island (WPB-1344)
- USCGC Staten Island (WPB-1345)
- USCGC Roanoke Island (WPB-1346)
- USCGC Pea Island (WPB-1347)
- USCGC Knight Island (WPB-1348)
- USCGC Galveston Island (WPB-1349)
- USCGC Attu (WPB 1317) (First of the "B" Class)

== 110' Calumet-class harbor tug (WYTM/WYT) ==
- USCGC Calumet (WYT-86)
- USCGC Hudson (WYT-87)
- USCGC Navesink (WYT-88)
- USCGC Tuckahoe (WYT-89)

== 110' Arundel-class harbor tug (WYTM/WYT) ==
- USCGC Arundel (WYT-90)
- USCGC Mahoning (WYT-91)
- USCGC Naugatuck (WYT-92)
- USCGC Raritan (WYT-93)

== 110' Manitou-class harbor tug (WYTM/WYT) ==
- USCGC Manitou (WYTM-60)
- USCGC Kaw (WYTM-61)

== 110' Apalachee-class harbor tug (WYT) ==
- USCGC Apalachee (WYT-71)
- USCGC Yankton (WYT-72)
- USCGC Mohican (WYT-73)
- USCGC Chinook (WYTM-96)
- USCGC Ojibwa (WYT-97)
- USCGC Snohomish (WYT-98)
- USCGC Sauk (WYT-99)

== 100' inland buoy tender (WLI) ==
- USCGC Barberry (WLI-294)
- USCGC Bluebell (WLI-313)
- USCGC Buckthorn (WLI-642)

== 100' inland construction tender (WLIC) ==
- USCGC Smilax (WLIC-315)

== 100' Corwin-class patrol boats ==
- USCGC Corwin (YN-80)
- USCGC Dallas (YN-81)
- USCGC Dexter (YN-82)
- USCGC Eagle (YN-83)
- USCGC Forward (YN-84)
- USCGC Gallatin (YN-85)
- USCGC Mahoning (YN-86)
- USCGC Nansemond (YN-87)
- USCGC Naugatuck (YN-88)
- USCGC Patriot (YN-89)
- USCGC Perry (YN-90)
- USCGC Petrel (YN-91)
- USCGC Wolcott (YN-92)

== 95' Cape-class cutter ==
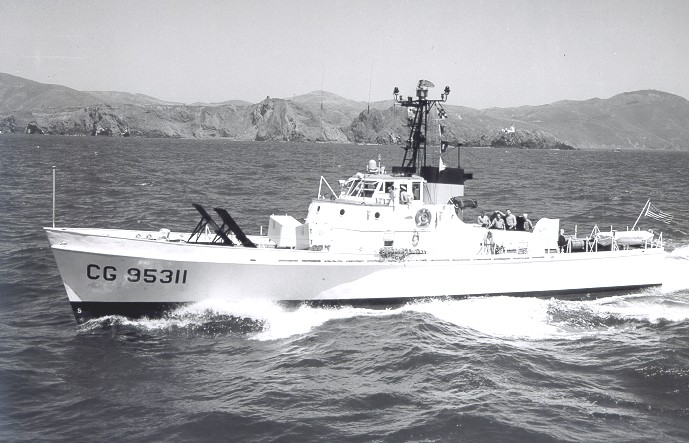
USCGC Cape Hedge (WPB-95311)

- USCGC Cape Small (WPB-95300)
- USCGC Cape Coral (WPB-95301)
- USCGC Cape Higgon (WPB-95302)
- USCGC Cape Upright (WPB-95303)
- USCGC Cape Gull (WPB-95304)
- USCGC Cape Hatteras (WPB-95305)
- USCGC Cape George (WPB-95306)
- USCGC Cape Current (WPB-95307)
- USCGC Cape Strait (WPB-95308)
- USCGC Cape Carter (WPB-95309)
- USCGC Cape Wash (WPB-95310)
- USCGC Cape Hedge (WPB-95311)
- USCGC Cape Knox (WPB-95312)
- USCGC Cape Morgan (WPB-95313)
- USCGC Cape Fairweather (WPB-95314)
- USCGC La Crete a Pierrot (WPB-95315)
- USCGC Cape Fox (WPB-95316)
- USCGC Cape Jellison (WPB-95317)
- USCGC Cape Newagen (WPB-95318)
- USCGC Cape Romain (WPB-95319)
- USCGC Cape Starr (WPB-95320)
- USCGC Cape Cross (WPB-95321)
- USCGC Cape Horn (WPB-95322)
- USCGC Cape Darby (WPB-95323)
- USCGC Cape Shoalwater (WPB-95324)
- USCGC Cape Florida (WPB-95325)
- USCGC Cape Corwin (WPB-95326)
- USCGC Cape Porpoise (WPB-95327)
- USCGC Cape Henlopen (WPB-95328)
- USCGC Cape Kiwanda (WPB-95329)
- USCGC Cape Falcon (WPB-95330)
- USCGC Cape Trinity (WPB-95331)
- USCGC Cape York (WPB-95332)
- USCGC Cape Rosier (WPB-95333)
- USCGC Cape Sable (WPB-95334)
- USCGC Cape Providence (WPB-95335)

== 87' Marine Protector-class coastal patrol boat (WPB) ==
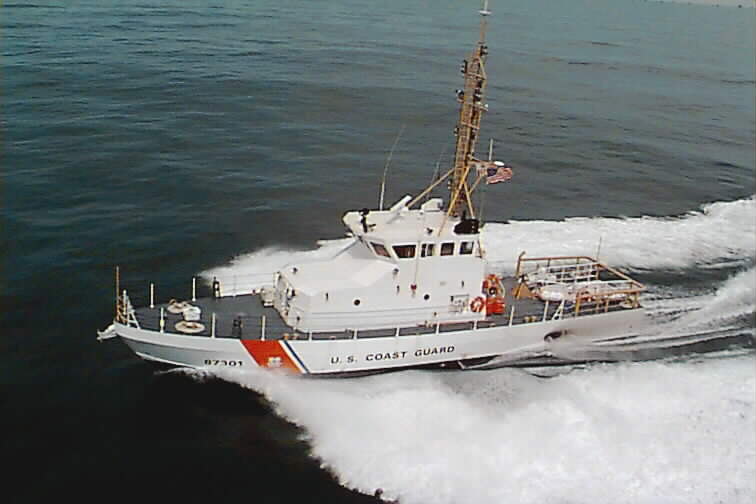
USCGC Barracuda (WPB-87301), a USCG Coastal Patrol Boat

- USCGC Barracuda (WPB-87301)
- USCGC Hammerhead (WPB-87302)
- USCGC Mako (WPB-87303)
- USCGC Marlin (WPB-87304)
- USCGC Stingray (WPB-87305)
- USCGC Dorado (WPB-87306)
- USCGC Osprey (WPB-87307)
- USCGC Chinook (WPB-87308)
- USCGC Albacore (WPB-87309)
- USCGC Tarpon (WPB-87310)
- USCGC Cobia (WPB-87311)
- USCGC Hawksbill (WPB-87312)
- USCGC Cormorant (WPB-87313)
- USCGC Finback (WPB-87314)
- USCGC Amberjack (WPB-87315)
- USCGC Kittiwake (WPB-87316)
- USCGC Blackfin (WPB-87317)
- USCGC Bluefin (WPB-87318)
- USCGC Yellowfin (WPB-87319)
- USCGC Manta (WPB-87320)
- USCGC Coho (WPB-87321)
- USCGC Kingfisher (WPB-87322)
- USCGC Seahawk (WPB-87323)
- USCGC Steelhead (WPB-87324)
- USCGC Beluga (WPB-87325)
- USCGC Blacktip (WPB-87326)
- USCGC Pelican (WPB-87327)
- USCGC Ridley (WPB-87328)
- USCGC Cochito (WPB-87329)
- USCGC Manowar (WPB-87330)
- USCGC Moray (WPB-87331)
- USCGC Razorbill (WPB-87332)
- USCGC Adelie (WPB-87333)
- USCGC Gannet (WPB-87334)
- USCGC Narwhal (WPB-87335)
- USCGC Sturgeon (WPB-87336)
- USCGC Sockeye (WPB-87337)
- USCGC Ibis (WPB-87338)
- USCGC Pompano (WPB-87339)
- USCGC Halibut (WPB-87340)
- USCGC Bonito (WPB-87341)
- USCGC Shrike (WPB-87342)
- USCGC Tern (WPB-87343)
- USCGC Heron (WPB-87344)
- USCGC Wahoo (WPB-87345)
- USCGC Flyingfish (WPB-87346)
- USCGC Haddock (WPB-87347)
- USCGC Brant (WPB-87348)
- USCGC Shearwater (WPB-87349)
- USCGC Petrel (WPB-87350)
- USCGC Sea Lion (WPB-87352)
- USCGC Skipjack (WPB-87353)
- USCGC Dolphin (WPB-87354)
- USCGC Hawk (WPB-87355)
- USCGC Sailfish (WPB-87356)
- USCGC Sawfish (WPB-87357)
- USCGC Swordfish (WPB-87358)
- USCGC Tiger Shark (WPB-87359)
- USCGC Blue Shark (WPB-87360)
- USCGC Sea Horse (WPB-87361)
- USCGC Sea Otter (WPB-87362)
- USCGC Manatee (WPB-87363)
- USCGC Ahi (WPB-87364)
- USCGC Pike (WPB-87365)
- USCGC Terrapin (WPB-87366)
- USCGC Sea Dragon (WPB-87367)
- USCGC Sea Devil (WPB-87368)
- USCGC Crocodile (WPB-87369)
- USCGC Diamondback (WPB-87370)
- USCGC Reef Shark (WPB-87371)
- USCGC Alligator (WPB-87372)
- USCGC Sea Dog (WPB-87373)
- USCGC Sea Fox (WPB-87374)

== 82' Point-class patrol boat (WPB) ==
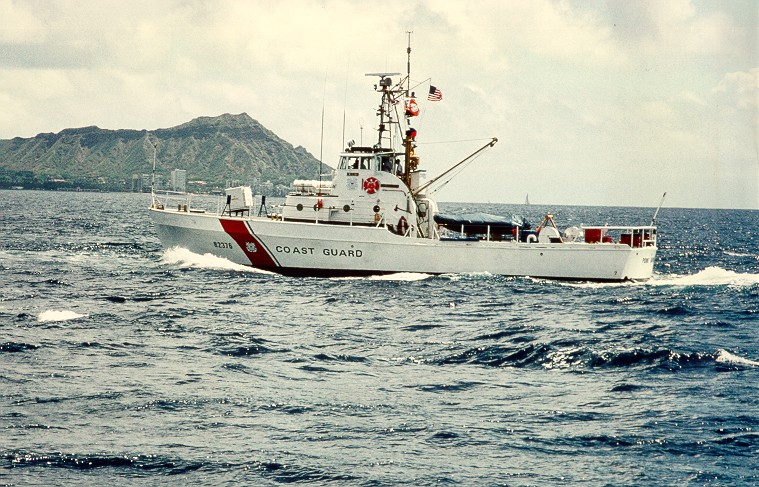
USCGC Point Evans (WPB-82354)

- USCGC Point Arden (WPB-82309)
- USCGC Point Arena (WPB-82346)
- USCGC Point Baker (WPB-82342)
- USCGC Point Banks (WPB-82327)
- USCGC Point Barnes (WPB-82371)
- USCGC Point Barrow (WPB-82348)
- USCGC Point Batan (WPB-82340)
- USCGC Point Bennett (WPB-82351)
- USCGC Point Bonita (WPB-82347)
- USCGC Point Bridge (WPB-82338)
- USCGC Point Brower (WPB-82372)
- USCGC Point Brown (WPB-82362)
- USCGC Point Camden (WPB-82373)
- USCGC Point Carrew (WPB-82374)
- USCGC Point Caution (WPB-82301)
- USCGC Point Charles (WPB-82361)
- USCGC Point Chico (WPB-82339)
- USCGC Point Clear (WPB-82315)
- USCGC Point Comfort (WPB-82317)
- USCGC Point Countess (WPB-82335)
- USCGC Point Cypress (WPB-82326)
- USCGC Point Divide (WPB-82337)
- USCGC Point Doran (WPB-82375)
- USCGC Point Dume (WPB-82325)
- USCGC Point Ellis (WPB-82330)
- USCGC Point Estero (WPB-82344)
- USCGC Point Evans (WPB-82354)
- USCGC Point Francis (WPB-82356)
- USCGC Point Franklin (WPB-82350)
- USCGC Point Gammon (WPB-82328)
- USCGC Point Garnet (WPB-82310)
- USCGC Point Glass (WPB-82336)
- USCGC Point Glover (WPB-82307)
- USCGC Point Grace (WPB-82323)
- USCGC Point Grey (WPB-82324)
- USCGC Point Hannon (WPB-82355)
- USCGC Point Harris (WPB-82376)
- USCGC Point Herron (WPB-82318)
- USCGC Point Heyer (WPB-82369)
- USCGC Point Highland (WPB-82333)
- USCGC Point Hobart (WPB-82377)
- USCGC Point Hope (WPB-82302)
- USCGC Point Hudson (WPB-82322)
- USCGC Point Huron (WPB-82357)
- USCGC Point Jackson (WPB-82378)
- USCGC Point Jefferson (WPB-82306)
- USCGC Point Judith (WPB-82345)
- USCGC Point Kennedy (WPB-82320)
- USCGC Point Knoll (WPB-82367)
- USCGC Point League (WPB-82304)
- USCGC Point Ledge (WPB-82334)
- USCGC Point Lobos (WPB-82366)
- USCGC Point Lomas (WPB-82321)
- USCGC Point Lookout (WPB-82341)
- USCGC Point Marone (WPB-82331)
- USCGC Point Martin (WPB-82379)
- USCGC Point Mast (WPB-82316)
- USCGC Point Monroe (WPB-82353)
- USCGC Point Nowell (WPB-82363)
- USCGC Point Orient (WPB-82319)
- USCGC Point Partridge (WPB-82305)
- USCGC Point Richmond (WPB-82370)
- USCGC Point Roberts (WPB-82332)
- USCGC Point Sal (WPB-82352)
- USCGC Point Slocum (WPB-82313)
- USCGC Point Spencer (WPB-82349)
- USCGC Point Steele (WPB-82359) (ex-Point Buchon)
- USCGC Point Stuart (WPB-82358)
- USCGC Point Swift (WPB-82312)
- USCGC Point Thatcher (WPB-82314)
- USCGC Point Turner (WPB-82365) (ex-Point Houghton)
- USCGC Point Verde (WPB-82311)
- USCGC Point Warde (WPB-82368)
- USCGC Point Welcome (WPB-82329)
- USCGC Point Wells (WPB-82343)
- USCGC Point White (WPB-82308)
- USCGC Point Whitehorn (WPB-82364)
- USCGC Point Winslow (WPB-82360)
- USCGC Point Young (WPB-82303)

== 80' inland buoy tender (WLI) ==
- USCGC Tern (WLI-80801)

== 75' Gasconade-class river buoy tender (WLR) ==
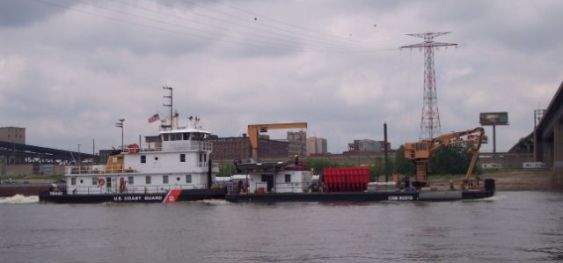
USCGC Gasconade (WLR-75401)

- USCGC Gasconade (WLR-75401)
- USCGC Muskingum (WLR-75402)
- USCGC Wyaconda (WLR-75403)
- USCGC Chippewa (WLR-75404)
- USCGC Cheyenne (WLR-75405)
- USCGC Kickapoo (WLR-75406)
- USCGC Kanawha (WLR-75407)
- USCGC Patoka (WLR-75408)
- USCGC Chena (WLR-75409)

== 75' Kankakee-class river buoy tender (WLR) ==
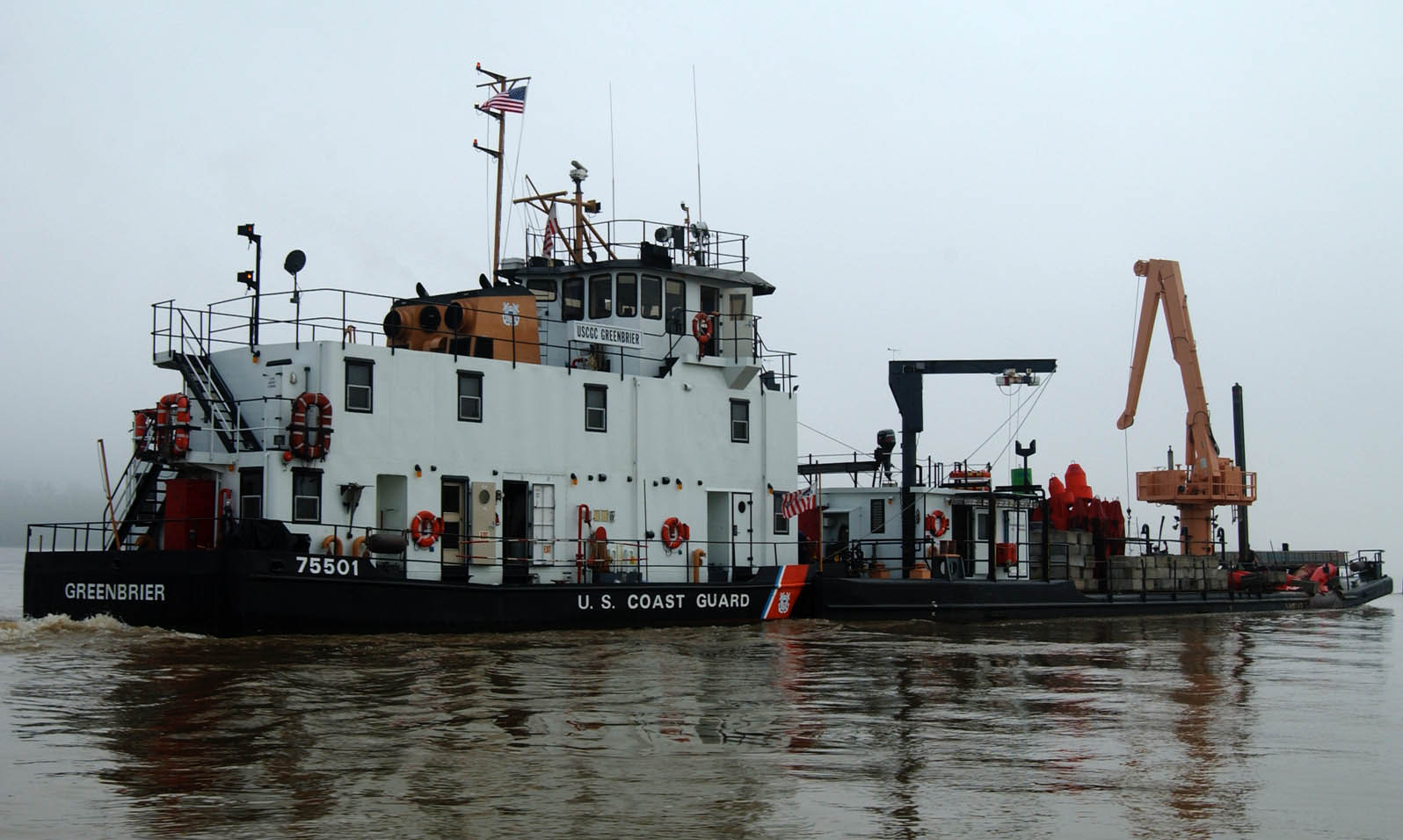
USCGC Greenbrier (WLR-75501), a diesel powered river tender built for the U.S. Coast Guard in 1990

- USCGC Kankakee (WLR-75500)
- USCGC Greenbrier (WLR-75501)

== 75' inland construction tender (WLIC) ==
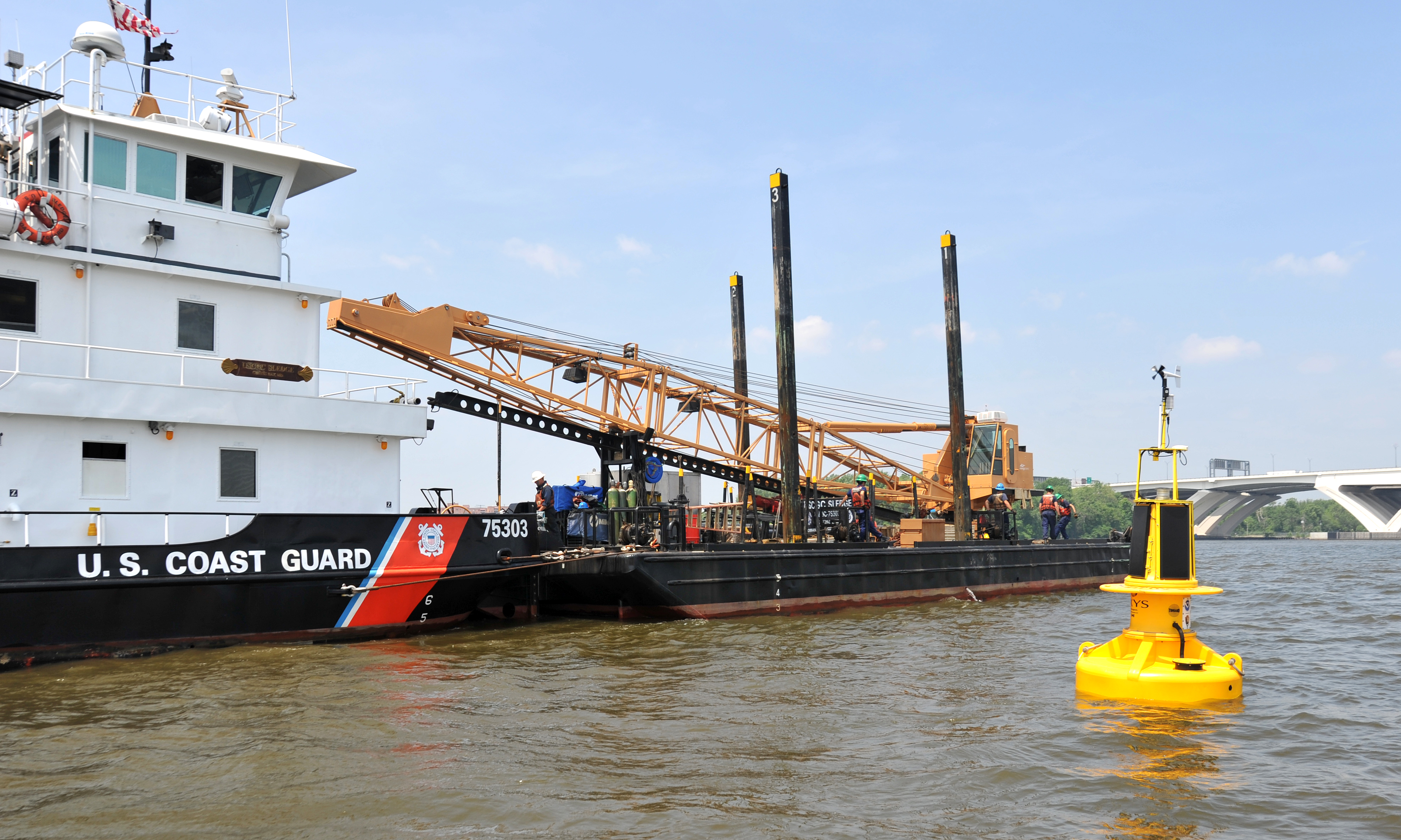
The Coast Guard cutter USCGC Sledge (WLIC-75303), a 75-foot construction tender homeported in Baltimore.

- USCGC Anvil (WLIC-75301)
- USCGC Hammer (WLIC-75302)
- USCGC Sledge (WLIC-75303)
- USCGC Mallet (WLIC-75304)
- USCGC Vise (WLIC-75305)
- USCGC Clamp (WLIC-75306)
- USCGC Wedge (WLIC-75307)
- USCGC Spike (WLIC-75308)
- USCGC Hatchet (WLIC-75309)
- USCGC Axe (WLIC-75310)

== 73' hydrofoil (WPGH) ==
- USCGC Flagstaff (WPBH-1)

== 65' river buoy tender (WLR) ==
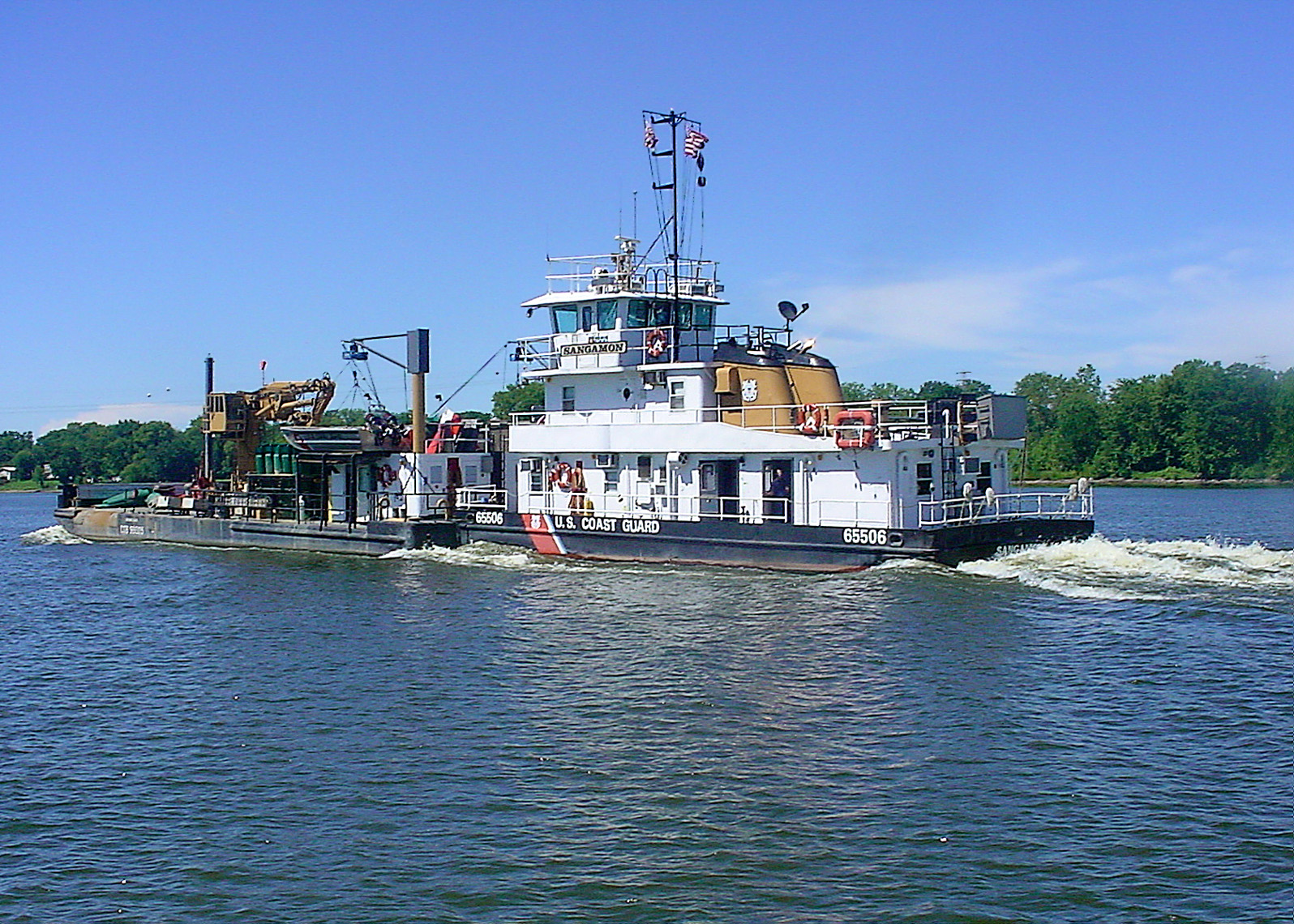
USCGC Sangamon (WLR-65506)

- USCGC Ouachita (WLR-65501)
- USCGC Cimarron (WLR-65502)
- USCGC Obion (WLR-65503)
- USCGC Scioto (WLR-65504)
- USCGC Osage (WLR-65505)
- USCGC Sangamon (WLR-65506)

== 65' inland buoy tender (WLI) ==
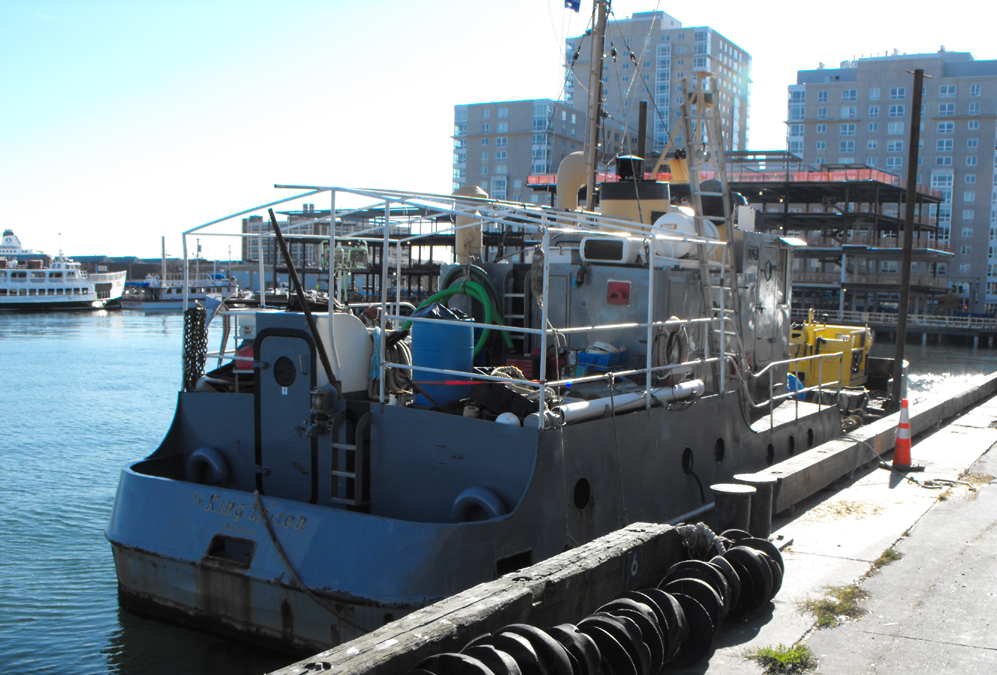
USCGC Chokeberry (WLI-65304)

- USCGC Bayberry (WLI-65400)
- USCGC Elderberry (WLI-65401)
- USCGC Blueberry (WLI-65302)
- USCGC Blackberry (WLI-65303)
- USCGC Chokeberry (WLI-65304)
- USCGC Loganberry (WLI-65305)

== 65' small harbor tug (WYTL) ==
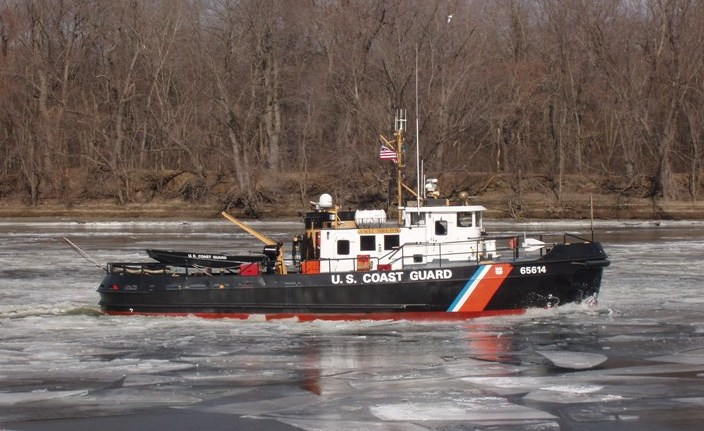
USCGC Bollard (WYTL-65614)

- USCGC Capstan (WYTL-65601)
- USCGC Chock (WYTL-65602)
- USCGC Swivel (WYTL-65603)
- USCGC Tackle (WYTL-65604)
- USCGC Towline (WYTL-65605)
- USCGC Catenary (WYTL-65606)
- USCGC Bridle (WYTL-65607)
- USCGC Pendant (WYTL-65608)
- USCGC Shackle (WYTL-65609)
- USCGC Hawser (WYTL-65610)
- USCGC Line (WYTL-65611)
- USCGC Wire (WYTL-65612)
- USCGC Bitt (WYTL-65613)
- USCGC Bollard (WYTL-65614)
- USCGC Cleat (WYTL-65615)

== See also ==
- Equipment of the United States Coast Guard
- United States Coast Guard Cutter
