= USCGC Catenary =

History

United States
- Name: Catenary
- Namesake: Catenary is the slack in an anchor line when a ship is at anchor.
- Builder: Gibbs Gas Engine Company, Jacksonville, Florida
- Commissioned: April 1962
- Decommissioned: 1 May 1995
- Identification: MMSI number: 367440120; Callsign: WDF3458
- Fate: Sold to the United States Merchant Marine Academy. Sold in 2018 to Stasinos Marine LLC.

General characteristics
- Displacement: 74 tons
- Length: 64 ft 11 in (19.79 m)
- Beam: 19 ft 1 in (5.82 m)
- Draft: 9 ft (2.7 m)
- Propulsion: 1 Caterpillar D375 V-8 diesel; 400 shaft horsepower
- Speed: (cruising) 7.0 kn (13.0 km/h; 8.1 mph)
- Range: (cruising) 3,690 nmi (6,830 km)
- Complement: 5
- Armament: None

USCGC Catenary (WYTL-65606) was a cutter in the United States Coast Guard (USCG). Constructed by the Gibbs Gas Engine Company and commissioned in early 1962, the vessel served as part of the USCG for over 30 years before being decommissioned in mid-1995 and sold to the United States Merchant Marine Academy. During her service Catenary was based primarily on the east coast of the United States where she was utilized mainly in a law enforcement role.

== Construction and design ==
Crewed by five personnel, Catenary was a small vessel displacing 74 tons. She was 64 ft 11 in (19.79 m) long, with a beam of 19 ft 1 in (5.82 m) and a 9 ft (2.7 m) draft. The vessel's powerplant consisted of one Caterpillar D375 V-8 diesel engine which produced 400 shaft horsepower and drove a single propeller, giving a cruising speed of 7.0 kn (13.0 km/h; 8.1 mph) and a cruising range of 3,690 nmi (6,830 km). Her maximum speed was 10.6 kn (19.6 km/h; 12.2 mph), at which she could patrol 1,130 nmi (2,090 km). She carried no armament, but was fitted with a SPN-11 detection radar. Upon completion she cost a total of $US 158,366 to construct.

== History ==
Catenary was one of fifteen steel-hulled icebreaking small harbor tugs that were put into service in the 1960s to replace 64 ft (20 m) wooden-hulled harbor tugs that the Coast Guard had used since the 1940s. Catenary was one of six in her class constructed by the Gibbs Gas Engine Company (later acquired by Aerojet General Corp.) in Jacksonville, Florida. After being commissioned in April 1962, she was initially homeported at Gloucester City, New Jersey, and served there until June 1988 when she was reassigned to Philadelphia, Pennsylvania. Her duties included law enforcement and search and rescue as well as ice operations.

On 1 May 1995, Catenary was decommissioned and sold to the United States Merchant Marine Academy. She served as a training vessel under the name MV Growler. She performed training missions involving shiphandling, maneuvering, navigation, and towing, as well as participating in Merchant Marine Academy public relations trips throughout Long Island Sound, the East River, and New York Harbor. The vessel was operated by crews of midshipmen participating in the Academy's Power Squadron, a fleet of power-driven vessels used for everything from fishing to long-range trips.
