= USCGC Gasconade =

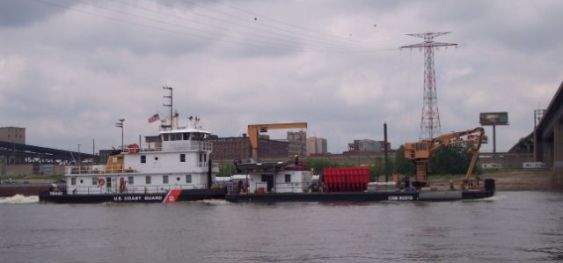
- USCGC Gasconade (WLR-75401)

History

United States
- Name: USCGC Gasconade
- Operator: United States Coast Guard
- Builder: Saint Louis Shipbuilding & Steel Co.
- Completed: 1964
- Commissioned: 15 January 1964
- Home port: St. Louis, Missouri
- Identification: MMSI number: 366999514; Callsign: NSAU
- Status: In service

General characteristics
- Class & type: Gasconade-class 75 ft (23 m) river buoy tender
- Displacement: 141 tons
- Length: 75 ft (23 m)
- Beam: 22 ft (6.7 m)
- Draft: 4 ft 6 in (1.37 m)
- Propulsion: 2 Caterpillar diesel engines turning 2 shafts with 600 bhp
- Speed: 8 knots (15 km/h)
- Complement: 13 enlisted
- Armament: small arms
- Notes: Designed to work in tandem with a 90 ft (27 m) work barge

USCGC Gasconade is a Gasconade-class 75-foot (23 m) river buoy tender which was built in 1964 at St. Louis, Missouri where she was initially homeported. In 1965 she was assigned a homeport of Omaha, Nebraska. In 2021, she was assigned a homeport at St. Louis. On 15 January 2024 she had provided aids-to-navigation service on the Western rivers of the United States for 60 years.

== Design ==
Gasconade pushes a specific-use 90-foot (27 m) aid to navigation maintenance barge, with a crane and buoy service gear. The vessel has a 22-foot (6.7 m) beam, 4-foot (1.2 m) of draft, and displaces 141 tons (full load). She is powered by two diesel engines turning two shafts with 600 bhp, giving the vessel a capability of eight knots.

== History ==
Gasconade was initially assigned a homeport at St. Louis, Missouri in 1964 but was transferred to Florence, Nebraska on 27 July 1965. On 27 September 1965, Gasconade transferred her homeport to the Corps of Engineers facility on John J. Pershing Road in Omaha, Nebraska. In the autumn of 2021, she transferred her homeport once again, back to Arsenal Street, St. Louis. Gasconade is commanded by a master chief boatswain's mate with a crew of sixteen assigned. Her area of operation includes the Missouri River from mile marker 0.0 located at Hartford, Illinois to mile marker 732.3 at Sioux City, Iowa.

== Bibliography ==
- "Sector Upper Mississippi River Cutters". USCG Sector Upper Mississippi River. U.S. Coast Guard.
- Scheina, Robert L. (1990). U.S. Coast Guard Cutters & Craft, 1946-1990. Naval Institute Press, Annapolis. ISBN 978-0-87021-719-7.
