= USCGC Greenbrier (WLR-75501) =

United States Coast Guard buoy tender, built in 1990

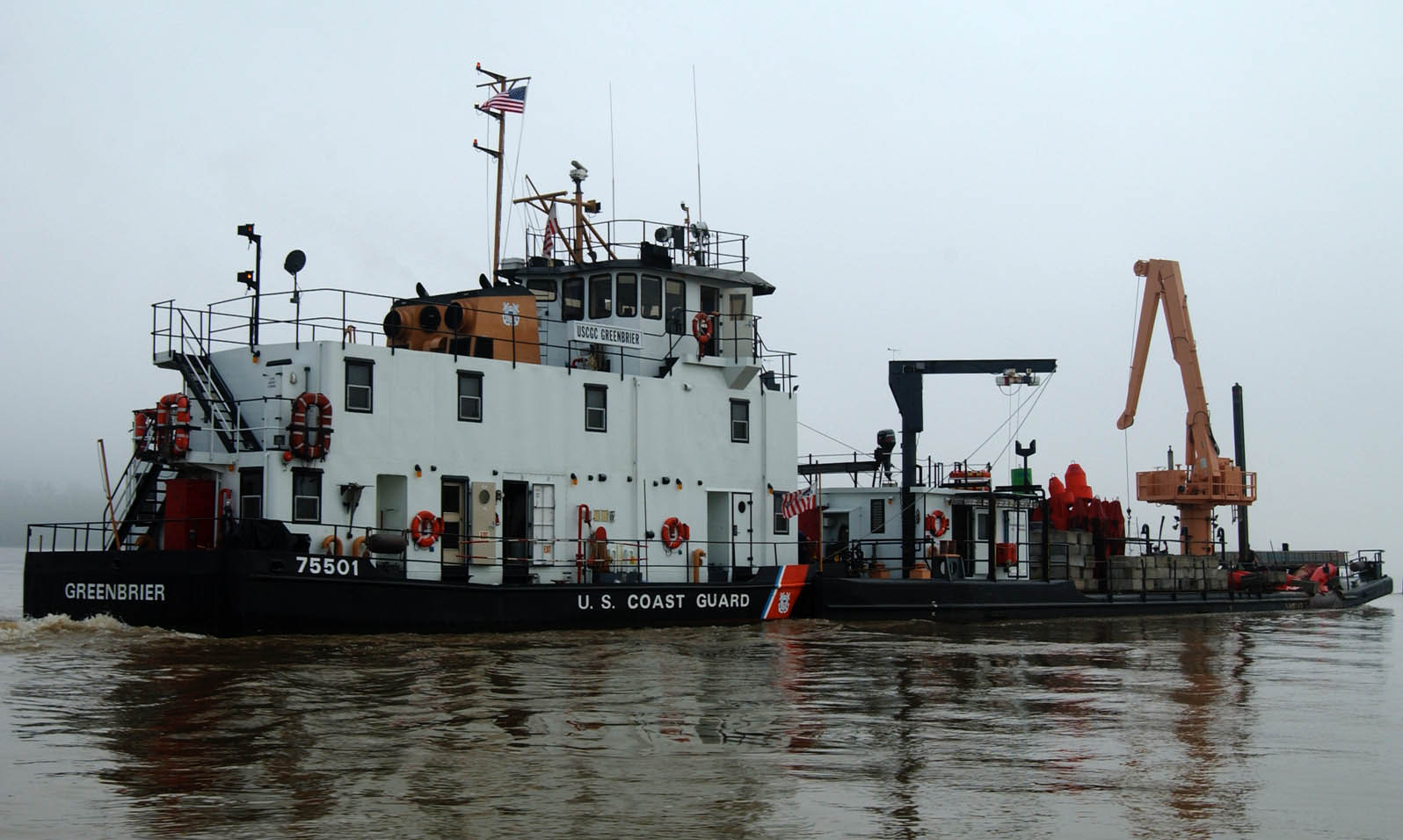

History

United States
- Name: USCGC Greenbrier
- Operator: United States Coast Guard
- Builder: Avondale Shipyard Small Boat Division, New Orleans, Louisiana
- Completed: 1990
- Home port: Natchez, Mississippi
- Identification: MMSI number: 366999524; Callsign: NAOA
- Status: In service

General characteristics
- Class & type: Kankakee-class 75-foot river buoy tender
- Displacement: 172 tons
- Length: 75 ft (23 m)
- Beam: 24 ft (7.3 m)
- Draft: 5 ft (1.5 m)
- Propulsion: 2 diesel engines turning 2 shafts with 1,080 bhp
- Speed: 12 knots
- Crew: 19

USCGC Greenbrier is a Kankakee class 75-foot river buoy tender which was built in 1990 by Avondale Shipyard Small Boat Division, New Orleans, Louisiana.

The tenders push a specific-use 130 foot maintenance barge, with specialized cranes and equipment. The vessel has a 24 foot beam, 5 foot of draft, and displaces 172 tons (full load). There is a crew of 19 but only 13 racks on board. The Kankakee class ships were built to replace old vessels. These are powered by 2 diesel engines turning 2 shafts with 1,080 bhp, giving the vessels a capability of 12 knots (22 km/h; 14 mph)

The Greenbrier is based out of the Cutter Support Team Natchez Moorings on L.E. Barry Road, in Natchez, Mississippi, and was involved in Hurricane Katrina relief operations in September 2005.
