= USCGC Kankakee (WLR-75500) =

United States Coast Guard buoy tender, built in 1990

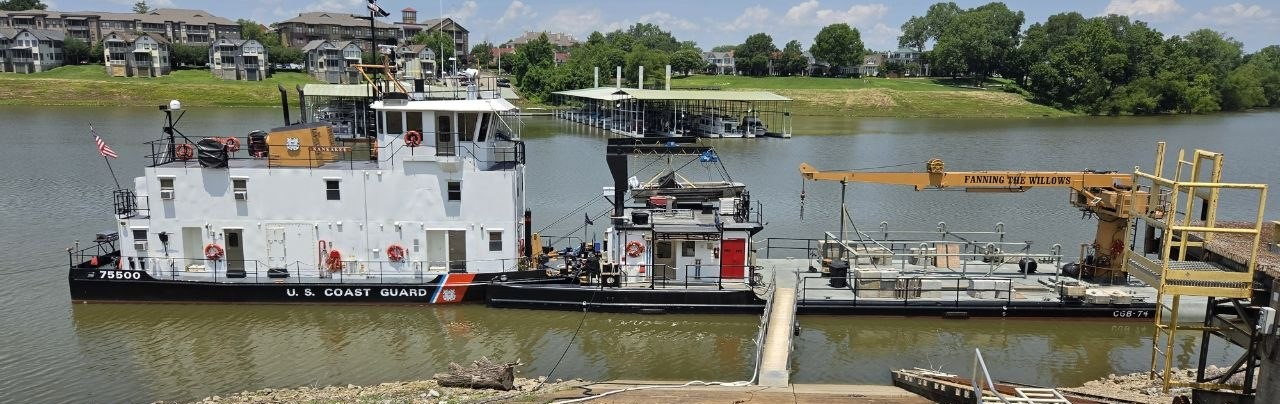
- USCGC Kankakee in its homeport of Memphis, TN

History

United States
- Name: USCGC Kankakee
- Namesake: Lighthouse Tender Ship Kankakee and Kankakee River
- Operator: United States Coast Guard
- Builder: Avondale Shipyard Small Boat Division, New Orleans, Louisiana
- Laid down: 9 May 1988
- Launched: 8 July 1989
- Commissioned: 11 Oct 1990
- Home port: Memphis, Tennessee
- Identification: MMSI number: 366999523; Callsign: NAMR
- Status: In service

General characteristics
- Class & type: Kankakee-class 75-foot river buoy tender
- Displacement: 172 tons
- Length: 75 ft (23 m)
- Beam: 24 ft (7.3 m)
- Draft: 5 ft (1.5 m)
- Propulsion: 2 diesel engines turning 2 shafts with 1,080 bhp
- Speed: 12 knots
- Crew: 19

USCGC Kankakee is a Kankakee class 75-foot river buoy tender which was built in 1990 by Avondale Shipyard Small Boat Division, New Orleans, Louisiana.

== Area of Operation ==
The USCGC Kankakee operates in area of the Lower Mississippi River MM 683 - 813.6
