= Hispanics in the United States Coast Guard =

Military branch demographic

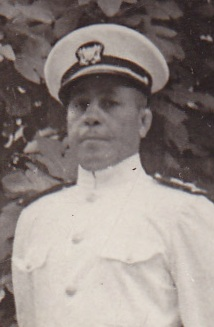
Joseph B. Aviles, Sr.

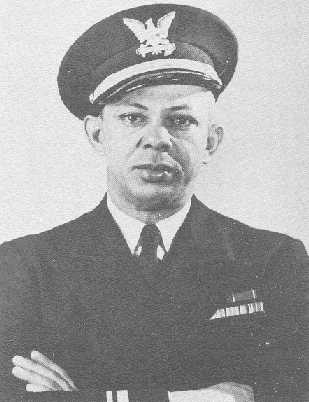
Clarence Samuels

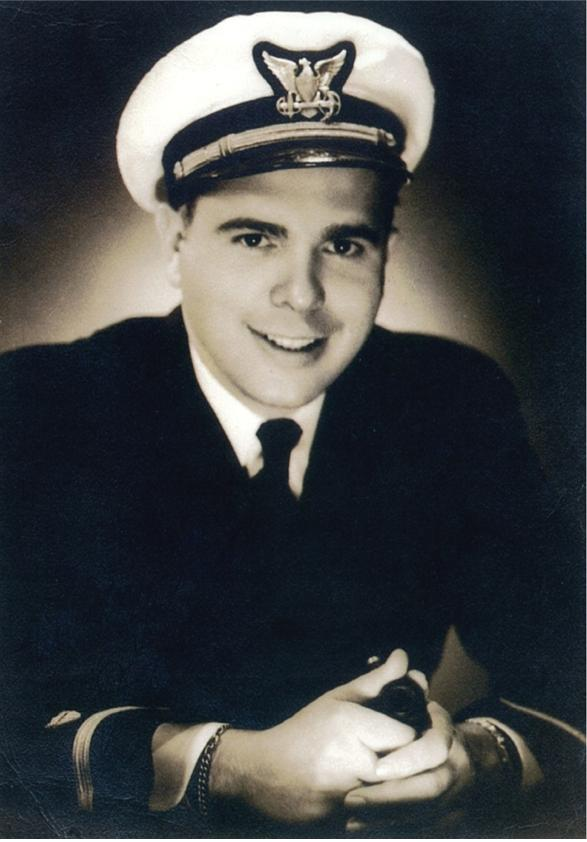
Joseph Tezanos

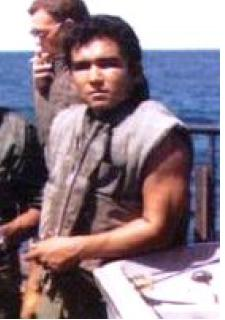
Heriberto Hernandez

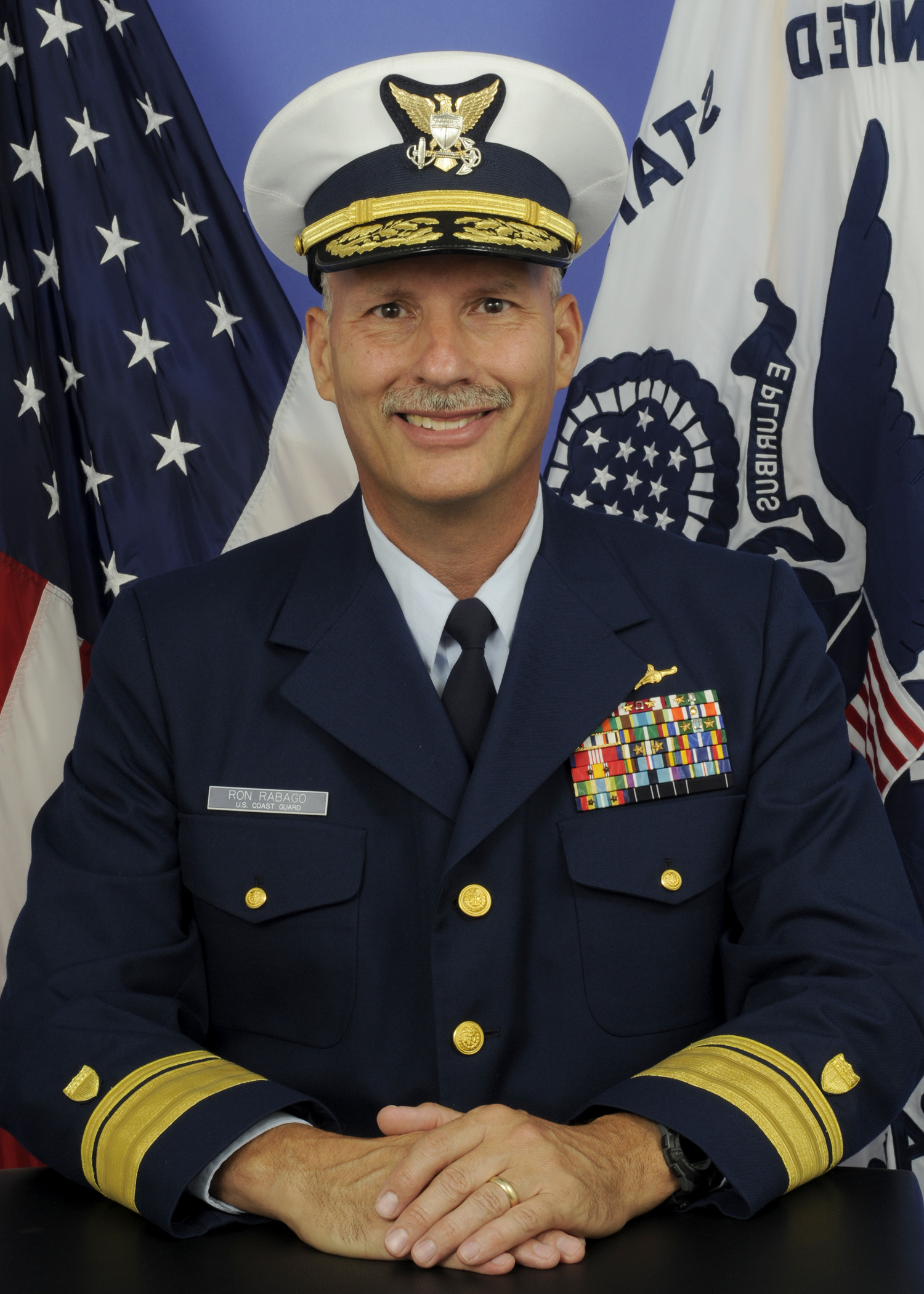
Ronald J. Rábago

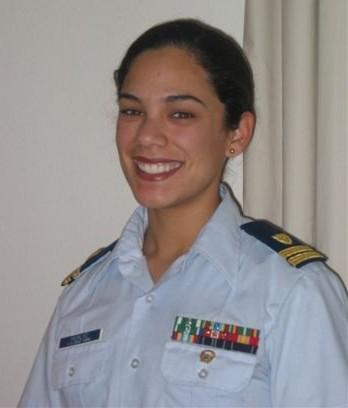
Angelina Hidalgo

Hispanics in the United States Coast Guard can trace their tradition of service to the early 19th century, when they initially performed duties at light house stations as keepers and assistant keepers in its predecessor services (the United States Revenue Cutter Service and the United States Life-Saving Service). Hispanic is an ethnic term employed to categorize any citizen or resident of the United States, of any racial background, of any country, and of any religion, who has at least one ancestor from the people of Spain, or is of non-Hispanic origin, but has an ancestor from Mexico, Puerto Rico, Cuba, Central or South America, or some other Hispanic origin. The three largest Hispanic groups in the United States are the Mexican-Americans, Puerto Ricans, and Cubans.

According to the U.S. Census Bureau the estimated Hispanic population of the United States is over 50 million, or 16% of the U.S. population, and Hispanics are the nation's largest ethnic or racial minority. The 2010 U.S. Census estimate of over 50 million Hispanics in the U.S. does not include the 3.9 million residents of Puerto Rico, thereby making the people of Hispanic origin the nation's largest ethnic or race minority as of July 1, 2005.

Amongst the Hispanic pioneers in the Coast Guard were the Andreu family of Florida; Joseph Ximenez, the first Hispanic-American to command a Coast Guard vessel; and Detlef Frederick Argentine de Otte, the first Hispanic to graduate from Revenue Cutter Service School of Instruction. The Coast Guard can be transferred to the Department of the Navy by the president or Congress during time of war. During World War I, Hispanics served in the United States Revenue Cutter Service and U.S. Life-Saving Service; and during World War II, Hispanics served aboard ships guarding the shores of the United States and the Atlantic Ocean against enemy submarines. However some men, such as Jose R. Zaragoza, served on missions on lonely atolls. Hispanics have served in every major conflict, and continue to do so. Coast guard service is not limited to armed conflicts with other nations; the Coast Guard also plays a vital role in the apprehension of illegal immigrants and drug smugglers.

Hispanic men and women have reached the top ranks of the Coast Guard, serving their country in sensitive leadership positions on domestic and foreign shores. In 1991, LTJG Katherine Tiongson became the first Hispanic-American woman to command an afloat unit. In 2006, Ronald J. Rábago was the first Hispanic-American promoted to rear admiral (lower half). In 2009, Rear Admiral Joseph R. Castillo became the first Hispanic-American district commander in the U.S. Coast Guard. Hispanics currently account for 11% of the enlisted personnel, and 9% of the United States Coast Guard Academy's student body.

== History ==
=== 1800–1900 ===
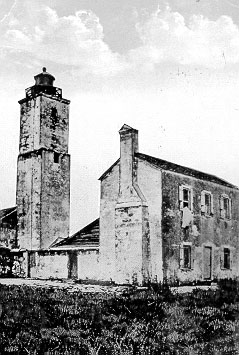
The 1824 St. Augustine lighthouse

The United States Coast Guard was formed in 1915 when its predecessors – the United States Life-Saving Service and the United States Revenue Cutter Service, which was established in 1790 by Secretary of the Treasury Alexander Hamilton as an armed maritime law enforcement service – were merged. According to William H. Thiesen, Atlantic Area Historian of the United States Coast Guard, (Note: Dr. William H. Thiesen has a Master’s degree from East Carolina University’s Program in Maritime History and a Ph.D. from University of Delaware's Hagley Program in the History of Technology and Industrialization. His research interests include Coast Guard history, naval history, ship design and construction, and the history of technology.) the following events involving Hispanics occurred in the early years of the Coast Guard its predecessor services.

The first Hispanic to serve in the United States Revenue Cutter Service, predecessor to the Coast Guard, was Juan Andreu who from 1824 to 1845 served as the Keeper of the St. Augustine Lighthouse in Florida, thus making him also the first Hispanic to oversee a U.S. federal installation of any kind. Maria Andreu (a.k.a. Maria Mestre de los Dolores), a family member, followed in his footsteps and served as Keeper of the same lighthouse from 1859 to 1862, becoming the first Hispanic-American woman to serve in the Coast Guard (USRCS) and the first Hispanic-American woman to command a U.S. federal shore installation.

The first Hispanic-American to command a Coast Guard vessel (USRCS) was Joseph Ximenez, who took command of the Carysfort Reef Lightship in Florida in 1843. He was not, however, the first Hispanic officer. That distinction belongs to Domingo Castrano, who is listed by the United States Revenue Cutter Service Register as having served aboard USRC Grant in 1872, as an engineering officer. The first known Hispanics to have served in the U.S. Life-Saving Service were Surfmen Telesford Pena and Ramon Delgado who, in 1897, served at the Brazos Life-Saving Station in Texas.

Born in Buenos Aires, Argentina, Detlef Frederick Argentine de Otte entered the Revenue Cutter Service Academy in 1889 and graduated in 1891. During his career he served aboard the USRC Levi Woodbury as second lieutenant. During the Spanish–American War he served with the North Atlantic Squadron, which took part in the blockade of Havana. Cuba. He later assumed command of several cutters; served as captain of the port for Brest, France, during World War I; and became the first commander of the service's Norfolk District, now known as Coast Guard District "5." He rose to the rank of commodore and received a promotion to rear admiral in retirement.

=== 1900–1941 ===
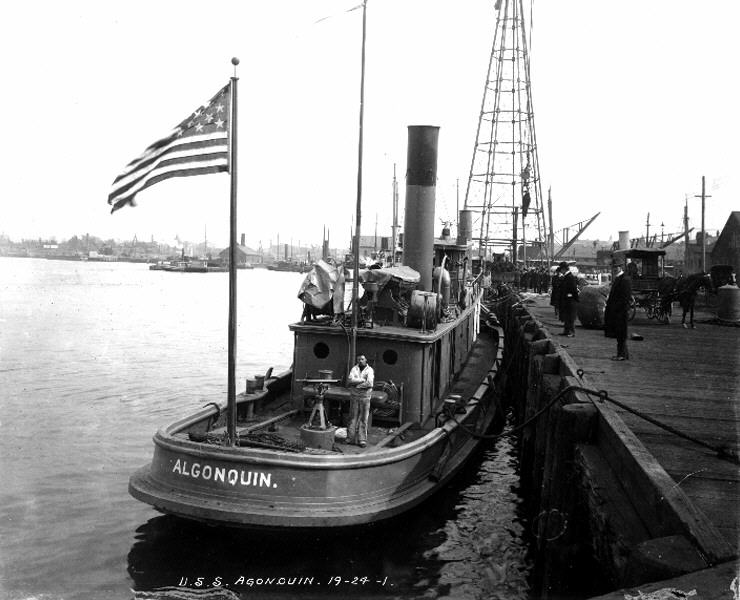
USRC Algonquin

In 1914, the schooner Isaiah K. Stetsen sank off the coast of Massachusetts during a storm. Mess Attendant First Class Arthur J. Flores and Seaman John E. Gomez, assigned to USRC Acushnet, volunteered to save survivors of the schooner and were awarded the Silver Lifesaving Medal for their heroism. That same year, USRC Algonquin, which was stationed in the Caribbean, set sail with fifteen Hispanic-Americans (a fourth of the cutter's complement) to San Juan, Puerto Rico to assist the Puerto Ricans battling fires that threatened to destroy parts of that city. In 1915, the City of San Juan, Puerto Rico, paid tribute to the crew of the cutter Algonquin and presented them with an Official Resolution of Thanks. The Coast Guard was already formed by September 1918, with the merger of United States Revenue Cutter Service and United States Life-Saving Service, when Seaman Richard E. Cordova became the first Hispanic coast guardsman to perish in a military conflict when his cutter, the USCGC Tampa, was torpedoed and sunk with all its crew by a German U-boat during World War I. The Coast Guard can be transferred to the Department of the Navy by the president or Congress during time of war. Boatswains Mate First Class Pablo Valent and Surfman Indalecio Lopez, members of the Texas Brazos Life-Saving Station crew were awarded the Coast Guard Silver Lifesaving Medal and The Grand Cross Medal from the American Cross of Honor Society for their assistance in the rescue of the crew of the schooner Cape Horn on September 16, 1919. In 1935, Chief Boatswains Mate Pablo Valent was given command of the Port Isabel (Texas) Boat Station, becoming the first Hispanic-American to do so.

On September 28, 1925, Chief Warrant Officer 2 Joseph B. Aviles, Sr. (1897–1990), born in a farm near the town of Naranjito, Puerto Rico when the island was still a Spanish colony, became the first Hispanic chief petty officer in the Coast Guard. During World War II he received a war-time promotion to chief warrant officer, becoming the first Hispanic to reach that level as well. Aviles joined the United States Navy in 1915 and served seven years and eight months, eventually reaching the rank of chief gunner's mate. During the years that he served in the Navy, the United States Congress passed the Jones–Shafroth Act (1917) which conferred United States citizenship on all citizens of Puerto Rico. On September 28, 1925, he entered the United States Coast Guard with the rate of chief gunners mate and served for two years before re-enlisting on September 11, 1928.

=== World War II ===
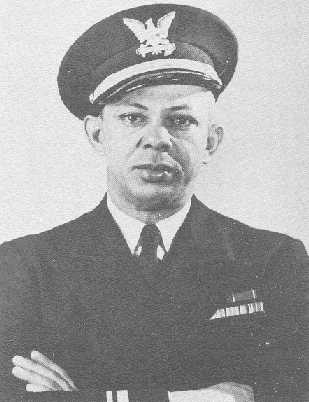
Lt. (jg) Clarence Samuels

During World War II, the Coast Guard was transferred to the Department of the Navy and as such many men saw action in said conflict. During the invasion of Saipan, which began on June 15, 1944, Valentin R. Fernandez, a landing craft coxswain, was awarded a Silver Lifesaving Medal for maneuvering a Marine landing party ashore under constant Japanese attack. The first known Hispanic-American coast guardsman to be awarded with a Bronze Star Medal was Louis Rua, whose craft, a U.S. Army large tug en route to the Philippines, went to the rescue of another ship which had been torpedoed by enemy action and helped save 277 survivors from the abandoned ship.

Upon the outbreak of World War II, Joseph B. Aviles, Sr. received a war-time promotion to chief warrant officer (November 27, 1944), thus becoming the first Hispanic American to reach that level as well. He retired from the Coast Guard on July 27, 1946, and worked as a security guard at a hospital in Baltimore until 1962 when at the age of 65 he retired. Aviles died at his residence in Columbia, Maryland, on February 22, 1990, and was buried with full military honors in Plot D O 2220A of the Baltimore National Cemetery at Catonsville, Maryland.

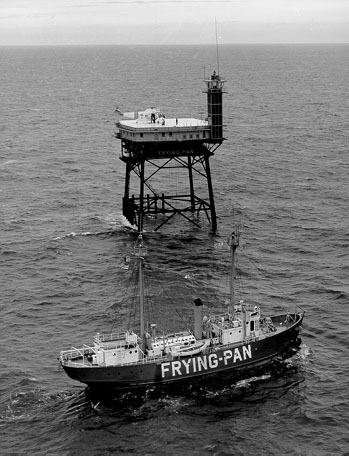
"Frying Pan" Lightship No. 115

Lieutenant Junior Grade Clarence Samuels, born on Bohio, Panama, enlisted in the Coast Guard on July 16, 1920, and became a naturalized citizen of the United States on July 21, 1923. On May 12, 1939, he was appointed a chief photographer's mate becoming not only the first Hispanic of African descent photographer in the Guard, but also only the second photographer in the entire history of the service. On July 29, 1944, he assumed command of Lightship No. 115, operating in the Panama Sea Frontier. Thus, he became the first admitted Hispanic of African descent to command a cutter, as well as the first one to be an officer-in-charge of a Coast Guard vessel during wartime. Samuels entered the Coast Guard as a seaman 2nd Class and reached the rank of lieutenant (as a part of the massive demobilization of the Coast Guard following the end of hostilities, his lieutenancy was revoked and he was dis-rated to chief photographer's mate). Samuels retired from the Coast Guard on September 1, 1947.

Gunner's Mate Second Class Joseph Tezanos, a native of Santander, Spain, was aboard LST-20 in Pearl Harbor, Hawaii, when an explosion on board one of the armada's LSTs set off a chain reaction. Tezanos along with a gang of several other hastily assembled volunteers scrambled on board a rescue boat. Tezanos and his shipmates rescued men from the water in danger of drowning and evacuated others from the burning ships. He was awarded the Navy and Marine Corps Medal for "distinguished heroism while serving as a volunteer member of a boat crew engaged in rescue operations during a fire in Pearl Harbor, Oahu, T.H. on 21 May 1944. Under conditions of great personal danger from fire and explosions and with disregard of his own safety he assisted in the rescuing of approximately 42 survivors some of whom were injured and exhausted from the water and from burning ships." Tezanos saw action at Kiska, Alaska; Tarawa Atoll in the Gilbert Islands; and Kwajalein Atoll in the Marshall Islands. Tezanos was sent to New London, Connecticut, at the Coast Guard Academy to take the four-month program, from which he graduated in 1945, becoming the first known Hispanic American to complete the service's Reserve Officer Training Program and one of the first Hispanic American officers in the United States Coast Guard. After the war he built a successful career in the international business world.

In December 1942, Lt. Juan del Castillo became the first Hispanic American to receive an officer's commission upon his graduation from the Officer's Candidate School. Del Castillo, who enlisted in June 1942, served on convoys in the Caribbean and on board cutters in the North Pacific. He also received training at the Naval Communications School at Harvard University. After he retired he worked for the U.S. Department of Agriculture and developed "CSM," a high-protein food substance used in disaster relief, famines and mass feeding operations.

Another USCGA graduate was Lieutenant John Gazzo Martinez, who was born in New Orleans and entered the service during World War II. He received an Academy appointment in 1946, and in 1951 was commissioned an ensign in the Coast Guard. From 1954 to 1956 LTJG Martinez served as commanding officer at the LORAN Transmitting Station in Yonago, Japan. Martinez prepared and delivered classes in LORAN (Long Range Aids to Navigation) procedures at the U.S. Air Force 34th Bombardment Squadron which was stationed nearby. He was later assigned as advisor in the U.S. Naval Mission to the Haitian Garde-Cotes d'Haiti. He taught classes for the Haitian military leadership and later oversaw the overhaul of Garde-Cotes patrol vessels.

Not everyone served aboard ships during the war. Some men like Jose R. Zaragoza served on missions on some lonely atolls. When 19-year-old Zaragoza, a native of Los Angeles, California, joined the Coast Guard, he was sent on patrols in the Pacific coast of the United States to defend against sabotage and invasion from the Japanese. Later he received instructions in the then-emerging and secretive field of LORAN navigation and was sent to Ulithi atoll, located between Guam and the Philippines. He assisted with LORAN research and development, and served on Ulithi for 15 months.

=== Vietnam War ===
During the Vietnam War, Fireman Heriberto S. "Ed" Hernandez from San Antonio, Texas, enlisted in the Coast Guard. In 1968, he was deployed for duty with Coast Guard Squadron One in Vietnam and was assigned to the USCGC Point Cypress, an 82-foot (25 m) cutter. On December 5, 1968 Point Cypress was attacked and Hernandez was killed during small boat operations. He was posthumously awarded the Bronze Star Medal with a combat "V" for valor and a Purple Heart Medal. Vice Admiral Elmo R. Zumwalt wrote: "Fireman Hernandez's heroic actions under enemy fire were instrumental to the success of friendly forces in harassing and destroying the enemy's morale and feeling of security. Fireman Hernandez's professional skill, courage under enemy fire, and devotion to duty reflected great credit upon himself, and were in keeping with the highest traditions of the United States Naval Service." The first Hispanic-American coast guardsman to receive the Silver Star Medal for combat action in Vietnam was Engineman Second Class Larry D. Villareal on January 21, 1969.

=== Post–Vietnam War ===
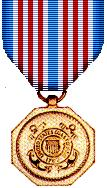
Coast Guard Medal

On September 16, 2000, Seaman Apprentice William Ray "Billy" Flores, was posthumously awarded the Coast Guard Medal in a ceremony near Ft. Worth, Texas. The Coast Guard Medal is awarded to any service member who, while serving in any capacity with the United States Coast Guard, distinguishes themselves by heroism not involving actual conflict with an enemy. On January 28, 1980, Flores' cutter, USCGC Blackthorn, collided with the tanker Capricorn. After the ships collided, Blackthorn capsized, and Flores and another crew member threw life-jackets to their shipmates who had jumped into the water. As the Blackthorn began to submerge, Flores used his own belt to strap open the life-jacket locker door, allowing additional life-jackets to float to the surface. He remained aboard to assist trapped shipmates and to comfort those who were injured and disoriented. Flores died in the line of duty.

In 2006, Ronald J. Rábago became the first person born in the United States of Hispanic American descent to be promoted to Rear Admiral (lower half) in the Coast Guard. He was the Coast Guard's Program Executive Officer (PEO) and Director of Acquisition Programs. On July 13, 2007, Rábago relieved Rear Adm. Gary T. Blore as the program executive officer of the U.S. Coast Guard's largest recapitalization and modernization initiative, the $24 billion, 25-year programmed Integrated Deepwater System Program. The Integrated Deepwater System Program (IDS Program), or "Deepwater," is the 25-year program to recapitalize the United States Coast Guard's aircraft, ships, logistics, and command and control systems. The $24 billion program includes equipment that will be used across all missions. Rábago not only acted as program executive officer of Deepwater, but also as director of all Coast Guard acquisition programs. His office oversaw all major acquisitions of cutters, aircraft, C4ISR and boats.

== Apprehending illegal immigrants and drug smugglers ==
The Coast Guard is focusing on retaining Hispanic and Spanish-speaking front-line workers as it aims to intercept illegal immigrants. The current Coast Guard workforce meets both diversity goals and operational demands for having Spanish-speaking workers on hand to communicate with apprehended illegal immigrants and human traffickers. These traffickers often pack people into boats and race along the Florida coastline, in an attempt to elude American enforcement.

The need for Spanish-speaking coast guardsmen was emphasized on September 17, 2008, when two cocaine-laden semi-submarines from Colombia were captured en route to the eastern Pacific coast of the United States. Just five days later, a 60-foot (18 m) semi-submersible was seized about 200 nautical miles (370 km) south of Guatemala. As the boarding team unloaded the last few bales, the Coast Guard said, the unstable vessel began to take on water through its exhaust vents and sank. The U.S. Navy, Coast Guard and Drug Enforcement Administration officials say South American drug cartels are turning to semi-submersible vessels, which have a low profile to avoid detection, because of the government's success at thwarting other smuggling techniques, including the use of fishing trawlers and speed boats.

== The U.S. Coast Guard Academy ==
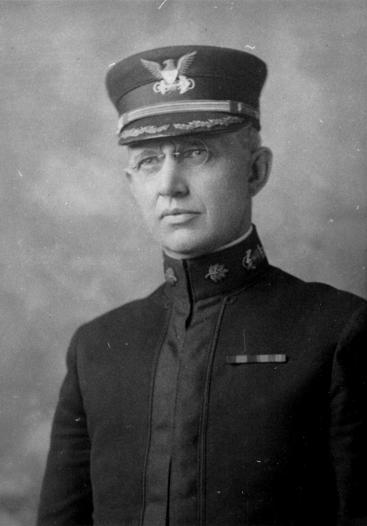
Commodore Detlef Frederick Argentine de Otte

The U.S. Coast Guard Academy, located in New London, Connecticut, accepts about 250 young men and women into its program each year. The four-year academic program leads to a Bachelor of Science degree in a variety of majors.

Detlef Frederick Argentine de Otte, born in Buenos Aires, Argentina, entered the Revenue Cutter Service School of Instruction (as the USCGA was previously known) in 1889 and graduated in 1891. He is the first Hispanic to the reach the rank of commodore and to receive a promotion to rear admiral in retirement.

Paul Powers Perez, class of 1945, was the first person born in the United States of Hispanic American descent to graduate from the academy. He was followed by John Gazzo Martinez, class of 1951. In 2002, Cadet 1/c Sarah Salazar became the first Hispanic female regimental commander at the Coast Guard Academy.

At 9% of the total student body, Hispanics are the largest minority group in the academy. As of 2010 the ethnic and racial breakdown of the student body in the academy is as follows: 81% White/Non-Hispanic, 9% Hispanic, 2% Black/Non-Hispanic, 3% Asian/Pacific Islander and 1% American Indian/Alaskan Native. The Coast Guard is actively promoting U.S. Coast Guard college and career opportunities amongst Hispanics. Captain Adolfo Ramirez is an in-house Executive on Loan at the Hispanic Association of Colleges and Universities at San Antonio, Texas, which represents more than 330 colleges and universities. His job is to explain the college programs, and military and civilian career opportunities that the Coast Guard can provide to Hispanic communities in education, and in service to the United States.

== Population representation ==
According to the Office of the Under Secretary of Defense, in 2003, Hispanic representation in the Coast Guard's NPS active component enlisted accessions was at 11 percent. Also in 2003, Hispanics represented slightly over 6 percent of the Coast Guard's active component officer accessions, and 13 percent of the Coast Guard's reserve enlisted accessions.

== Chronological list of personal Hispanic accomplishments in the USCG ==
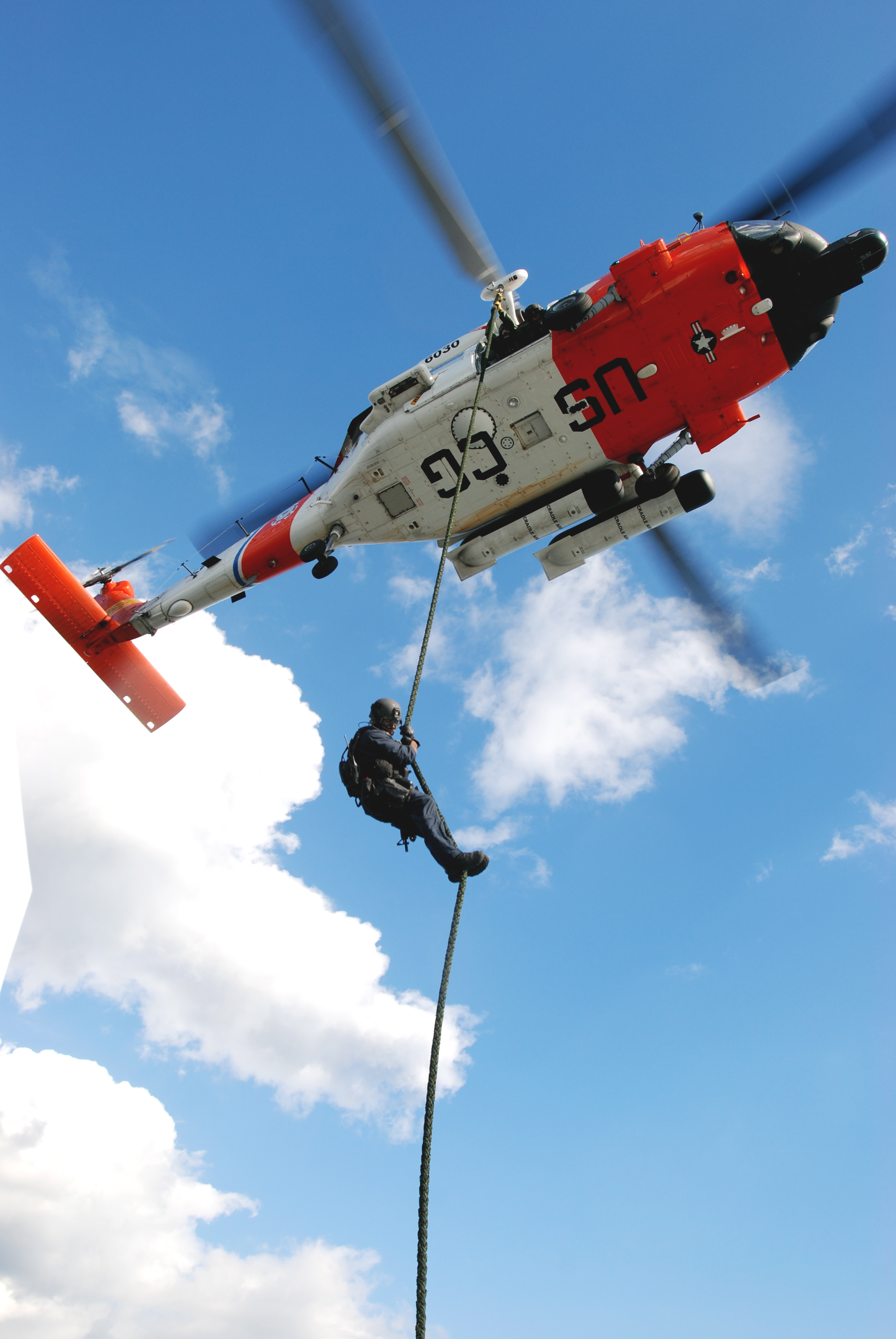
MSST HH-60 Jayhawk helicopter.

The following Hispanic-Americans are the first in their respective USCG fields to accomplish the following:

- YNC Grisel Hollis was the first Hispanic-American woman advanced to chief petty officer on May 1, 1991.
- In 1991, LTJG Katherine Tiongson became the first Hispanic-American woman to command an afloat unit when she took command of USCGC Bainbridge Island. She was also the first Hispanic-American woman intelligence officer in the Coast Guard.
- In 1992, Sonia Colon became the second Hispanic American woman advanced to chief petty officer.
- The first Hispanic to command a TACLET (Tactical Law Enforcement Team), was then-Lieutenant Jose L. Rodriguez when he took command of TACLET South, 1996–1998. He was also the first coast guardsman to command a U.S. Marine Corps unit when he took command of the Riverine Training Center, Special Operations Training Group, II MEF at Camp Lejeune, North Carolina in July 1999. He was also the first Hispanic-American coast guardsman to earn his Gold Navy/Marine Corps jump wings while in the Coast Guard and assigned to a jump billet (USMC Majors Billet at Special Operations Training Group II MEF). He earned his wings that same year. He also became the first commanding officer of one of the two MSSTs commissioned in the Coast Guard.
- In 2002, Lieutenant Junior Grade Angelina Hidalgo became the second Hispanic-American woman to command an afloat unit in the Coast Guard. She was also the second Hispanic female intelligence officer in the Coast Guard.
- Lieutenant Commander Quique Ramon Ortiz and Lieutenant Commander Jose Rodriguez commissioned the first Maritime Safety and Security Team (MSST)s in Coast Guard history, MSSTs 91101 and 91102 (East and West Coast). The MSST is an anti-terrorism team established to protect local maritime assets.
- On July 21, 2005, Captain Charley L. Diaz became the first Hispanic-American to command a high endurance cutter when he assumed command of the USCGC Sherman. In March 2007, he led the Sherman crew in the largest maritime drug bust in U.S. history with the seizure of the motor vessel Gatun off the coast of Panama carrying nearly 20 tons of cocaine worth an estimated $600M.
- In 2006, LT Isabel Papp, USPHS, became the first female medical officer to be assigned to a Port Security Unit (PSU). PSU's are deployable units organized for sustained force protection operations. She was also the first Hispanic-American female MD to be assigned to a PSU. She had also been the first Hispanic-American female Physician's Assistant in the Coast Guard Reserve.
- In July 2009, RDML Joseph R. Castillo became the first Hispanic-American district commander in the U.S. Coast Guard when he was appointed Commander of District 11.

== See also ==
- Hispanics in the United States Navy
- Hispanics in the United States Marine Corps
- Hispanics in the United States Air Force
- Hispanic Admirals in the United States Navy
- Hispanics in the United States Naval Academy
- Hispanic Americans in World War II
- Hispanics in the American Civil War
- Vietnam War

== Bibliography ==
- Larzelere, Alex (1997). The Coast Guard at War, Vietnam, 1965–1975. Naval Institute Press, Annapolis, Maryland. ISBN 978-1-55750-529-3.
