= USCGC Argus =

Heritage-class cutters of the United States Coast Guard

USCGC Argus (WMSM-915)
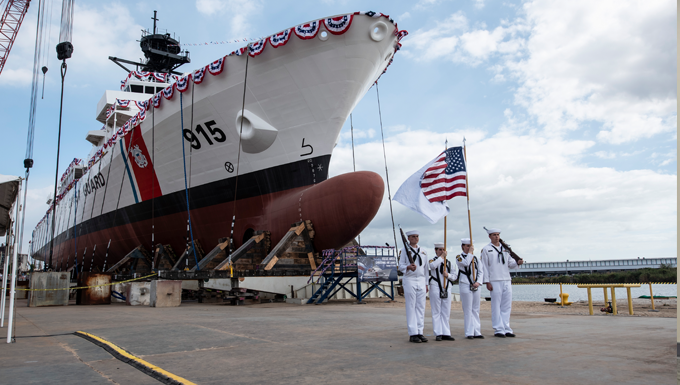
- Argus prior to her launch, October 2023

History

United States
- Name: Argus
- Namesake: USRC Argus
- Awarded: 15 October 2016
- Builder: Eastern Shipbuilding, Panama City
- Laid down: 28 April 2020
- Home port: San Pedro
- Identification: Hull Classification Symbol: WMSM-915
- Status: Under construction
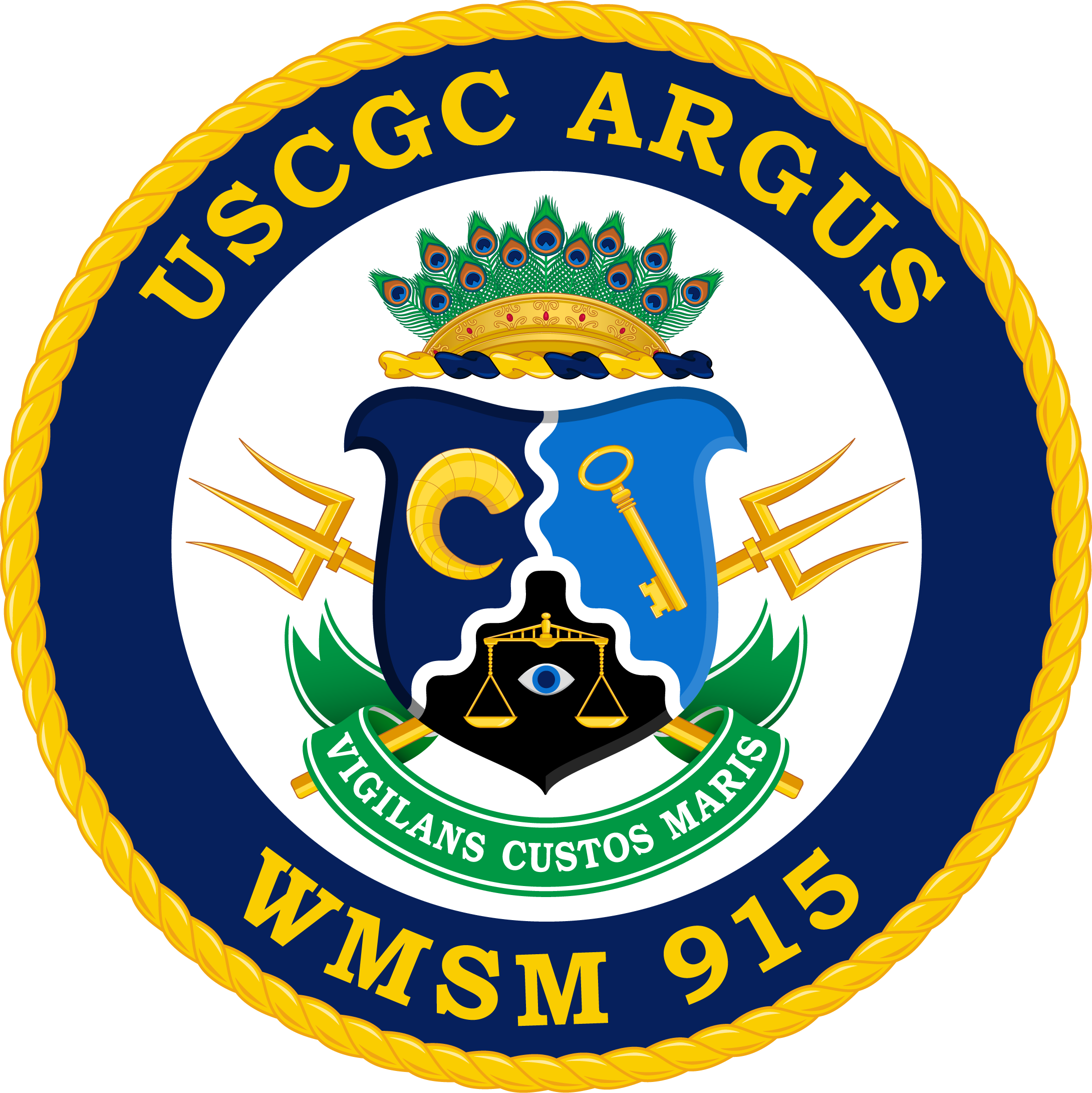
- Badge

General characteristics
- Class & type: Heritage-class cutter
- Displacement: 3,700 long tons (3,800 t) (full load)
- Length: 360 ft (110 m)
- Beam: 54 ft (16 m)
- Draft: 17 ft (5.2 m)
- Installed power: 4 × 940 eKW diesel generators
- Propulsion: 2 × 7,280 kW (9,760 hp) MAN 16V28/33D STC diesel engines at 1,000 rpm
- Speed: 24.5 knots (45.4 km/h; 28.2 mph)
- Range: 10,200 nmi (18,900 km; 11,700 mi) at 14 knots (26 km/h; 16 mph)
- Endurance: 60 days
- Boats & landing craft carried: 3 × Over-the-horizon boats
- Complement: 126
- Sensors & processing systems: Saab Sea Giraffe AN/SPS-77 AMB multi-mode naval Radar; AN/UPX-46 IFF; AN/URN-32 TACAN; MK 20 Mod 1 EOSS; Link 22 tactical data link
- Electronic warfare & decoys: AN/SLQ-32C(V)6 electronic warfare system; 2 × MK 53 Mod 10 NULKA decoy launching systems
- Armament: 1 × MK 110 57mm gun a variant of the Bofors 57 mm gun and Gunfire Control System; 1 × BAE Systems Mk 38 Mod 3 25 mm gun with 7.62 mm co-axial gun; 2 × M2 Browning .50 caliber (12.7 mm) machine guns mounted on a MK 50 Stabilized Small Arms Mount (SSAM); 4 × Crew Served M2 Browning .50 caliber (12.7 mm) machine guns; Designed For but not with additional weapons
- Armor: Ballistic protection over critical areas and main gun
- Aircraft carried: One MH-60 or MH-65, plus sUAS
- Aviation facilities: Hangar and helipad

USCGC Argus (WMSM-915) is the lead ship of the Heritage-class cutters of the United States Coast Guard (USCG), and a part of the OPC (Offshore Patrol Cutter) Ship Type. She is the second ship to be named after Argus Panoptes, the first being USRC Argus, a Revenue Cutter Service ship which was decommissioned and sold in 1804.

== Development and design ==
Heritage-class cutters are the newest class of cutter in the USCG, bridging the capabilities of the Legend and Sentinel classes. They are tasked to go against lightly armed hostiles in low-threat environments.

In February 2014, the USCG announced that Bollinger Shipyards, Eastern Shipbuilding, and General Dynamics Bath Iron Works had been awarded design contracts for the OPC. The Government Accountability Office denied contract appeals by VT Halter Marine and Ingalls Shipbuilding.

In September 2016, Eastern Shipbuilding of Panama City, Florida, was awarded a $110.3 million contract to build the first Offshore Patrol Cutter with an option to purchase eight additional cutters. On October 15, 2016, the Coast Guard issued a notice to proceed with the detailed design of the Offshore Patrol Cutter to Eastern Shipbuilding.

== Construction and career ==
The construction of Argus was planned to begin in the late summer of 2018, with delivery in August 2021. On September 28, 2018, the USCG exercised the contract option to begin construction of the lead Offshore Patrol Cutter, along with long-lead materials for OPC #2. The total value of the options exercised is $317.5 million. Delayed by the impact of Hurricane Michael in October 2018, steel cutting for USCGC Argus began on January 7, 2019. She was laid down on 28 April 2020.

In August 2023, the Coast Guard estimated that the Argus would not be delivered until around September 30, 2024, over three years later than its original projected delivery date of August 2021, and nearly six years after Eastern Shipbuilding first cut steel for the Argus in January 2019.

USCGC Argus was launched on October 27, 2023.

On March 5, 2025, Congressman Mike Ezell, Chairman of the Coast Guard and Maritime Transportation subcommittee of the House Committee on Transportation and Infrastructure, reported that the Coast Guard now expects delivery of USCGC Argus at the end of 2025, "four years late, and with a host of non-compliant parts."

== See also ==
- Integrated Deepwater System Program
