= USCGC Chase =

USCGC Chase can refer to the following ships of the United States Coast Guard:

- USCGC Chase (WHEC-718), was a Hamilton-class cutter launched in 1967, entered service in 1968 and was taken out of service in 2011. The vessel was then transferred to the Nigerian Navy and renamed NNS Thunder.
- USCGC Chase (WMSM-916), is a Heritage-class cutter that is under construction.

== See also ==
- USRC Salmon P. Chase (1865), a side-wheel steamer of the United States Revenue-Marine
- USRC Salmon P. Chase (1878), a training ship of the United States Revenue Cutter Service
- USS Chase, ships by the name for the U.S. Navy
