= USS LST-478 =

World War II tank landing ship

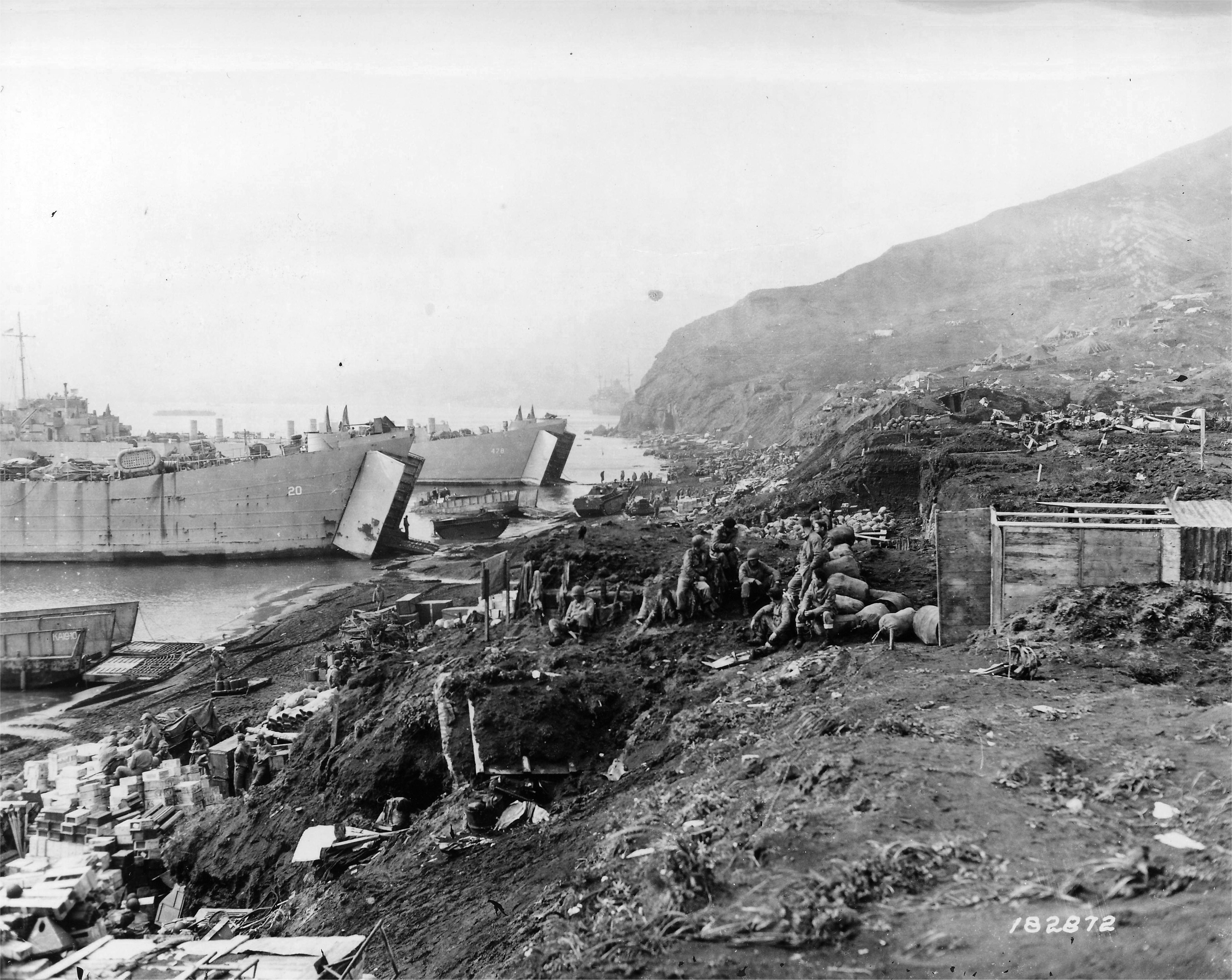
- USS LST-478 and LST-20, unloading on the beach at Kiska Island, Alaska, 23 August 1943. Just visible In the distance is the Nozina Maru, beached by the Japanese after bombing by American forces.

History

United States
- Name: LST-478
- Ordered: as a Type S3-M-K2 hull, MCE hull 998
- Builder: Permanente Metals Corporation, Yard No. 4, Richmond, California
- Cost: $1,711,380.19
- Yard number: 33
- Way number: 3
- Laid down: 17 August 1942
- Launched: 7 November 1942
- Sponsored by: Mrs. Ray Humphrey
- Commissioned: 13 March 1943
- Decommissioned: 23 March 1946
- Identification: Hull symbol: LST-478; Code letters: NGNQ
- Honors and awards: 5 × battle stars
- Fate: assigned to Commander Naval Forces Far East

Japan
- Operator: Shipping Control Authority for Japan
- In service: 23 March 1946
- Out of service: date unknown
- Renamed: Q100
- Stricken: 28 August 1947
- Fate: transferred to Maritime Administration (MARAD), 25 March 1948

United States
- Operator: MARAD
- Fate: Sold for scrapping, 25 March 1948

General characteristics
- Class & type: LST-1-class tank landing ship
- Displacement: 4,080 long tons (4,145 t) full load; 2,160 long tons (2,190 t) landing
- Length: 328 ft (100 m) oa
- Beam: 50 ft (15 m)
- Draft: Full load: 8 ft 2 in (2.49 m) forward; 14 ft 1 in (4.29 m) aft; Landing at 2,160 t: 3 ft 11 in (1.19 m) forward; 9 ft 10 in (3.00 m) aft
- Installed power: 2 × 900 hp (670 kW) Electro-Motive Diesel 12-567A diesel engines; 1,700 shp (1,300 kW)
- Propulsion: 1 × Falk main reduction gears; 2 × Propellers
- Speed: 12 kn (22 km/h; 14 mph)
- Range: 24,000 nmi (44,000 km; 28,000 mi) at 9 kn (17 km/h; 10 mph) while displacing 3,960 long tons (4,024 t)
- Boats & landing craft carried: 2 or 6 x LCVPs
- Capacity: 2,100 tons oceangoing maximum; 350 tons main deckload
- Troops: 16 officers, 147 enlisted men
- Complement: 13 officers, 104 enlisted men
- Armament: Varied, ultimate armament; 2 × twin 40 mm (1.57 in) Bofors guns; 4 × single 40 mm Bofors guns; 12 × 20 mm (0.79 in) Oerlikon cannons

Service record
- Part of: LST Flotilla 3
- Operations: Gilbert Islands operation (21 November–8 December 1943); Battle of Hollandia (21–29 April 1944); Capture and occupation of Guam (21–27 July 1944); Leyte landings (20 October 1944); Assault and occupation of Okinawa Gunto (2–9 April 1945)
- Awards: American Campaign Medal; Asiatic–Pacific Campaign Medal; World War II Victory Medal; Navy Occupation Service Medal w/Asia Clasp; Philippine Republic Presidential Unit Citation; Philippine Liberation Medal

USS LST-478 was a United States Navy LST-1-class tank landing ship used in the Asiatic-Pacific Theater during World War II.

== Construction ==
LST-478 was laid down on 17 August 1942, under Maritime Commission (MARCOM) contract, MC hull 998, by Kaiser Shipyards, Yard No. 4, Richmond, California; launched on 7 November 1942, sponsored by Mrs. Ray Humphrey; and commissioned on 13 March 1943.

== Service history ==
During the war, LST-478 was assigned to the Asiatic-Pacific Theater. She took part in the Gilbert Islands operation November and December 1943; the Battle of Hollandia in April 1944; the Battle of Guam in July 1944; the Battle of Leyte landing in October 1944; and the Battle of Okinawa in April 1945.

== Post-war service ==
Following the war, LST-478 performed occupation duty in the Far East until mid-March 1946. Upon her return to the United States and was decommissioned on 23 March 1946, and struck from the Navy list on 28 August 1947. On 25 March 1948, the ship was sold to the Consolidated Builders, Inc., Seattle, Washington, and subsequently scrapped.

== Honors and awards ==
LST-478 earned five battle stars for her World War II service.

== Notes ==
Citations

== Bibliography ==
Online resources

- "LST-478". Dictionary of American Naval Fighting Ships. Naval History and Heritage Command. This article incorporates text from this source, which is in the public domain.
- "Kaiser Permanente No. 4, Richmond CA". www.ShipbuildingHistory.com. 5 February 2014.
- "USS LST-478". NavSource. 28 February 2014.
- "MC-998".
