= USS Chase =

Two ships of the United States Navy have been named USS Chase.

- USS Chase (DD-323), a Clemson-class destroyer, commissioned in 1921 and decommissioned in 1930. It was named after Reuben Chase.
- USS Chase (DE-158), a Buckley-class destroyer escort, commissioned in 1943 and decommissioned in 1946. It was named for Admiral Jehu V. Chase.

== Other ships ==
- USS Edgar G. Chase, a WWII Evarts-class destroyer escort
- USS Samuel Chase, a WWII Arthur Middleton-class attack transport, named for signer of the Declaration of Independence Samuel Chase

== See also ==
- USS Chase County, a LST-491-class tank landing ship
- USCGC Chase, ships by the name, for the U.S. Coast Guard
- USRC Chase, two ships by the name, for the U.S. Revenue Cutter Service
