= Patrick M. Stillman =

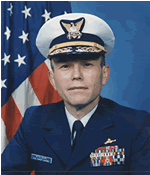
RADM Stillman

Flag of a Rear Admiral of the United States Coast Guard

Patrick M. Stillman is a retired Rear Admiral of the United States Coast Guard.

Stillman graduated from the Coast Guard Academy in 1972 where he received a Bachelor of Science degree. Stillman was assistant commandant for governmental and public affairs and has held several sea commands. Stillman's afloat assignments included Operations Officer, Executive Officer and later Commanding Officer of Eagle. He was the first commanding officer of the 270-foot medium endurance cutter USCGC Forward (WMEC 911)

Early in his career, he commanded the cutter Cape Cross. He served on the cutter Valiant as a deck watch officer and as Executive Officer on the cutter Vigorous. He was the Program Executive Officer (PEO) of the Integrated Deepwater System Program (IDS) from April 2001 to his retirement in April 2006 (G-D), becoming the founding father of the IDS. His successor in that position was Rear Admiral Gary Blore. Stillman holds a Master of Arts degree from Wesleyan University at Middletown, CT, and a Master of Public Administration from George Washington University.

Stillman retired from the United States Coast Guard in 2006.

== Awards and decorations ==
His personal awards and decorations include two Legions of Merit, three Meritorious Service Medals, two Coast Guard Commendation Medals and two Coast Guard Achievement Medals. In May 2006, he received the Coast Guard Distinguished Service Medal for "keen vision, tireless dedication, and unwavering focus" leading the Deepwater Program.

== Personal life ==
Stillman is married to the former Lori L. von Minden of Allen, Nebraska. They have two children, Tyler and Nathan.
