= USCGC Chase (WMSM-916) =

Heritage-class cutters of the United States Coast Guard

History

United States
- Name: Chase
- Namesake: USCGC Chase
- Awarded: 15 October 2016
- Builder: Eastern Shipbuilding, Panama City
- Laid down: Expected, 2021
- Acquired: Expected, 2023
- Home port: San Pedro
- Identification: Pennant number: WMSM-916
- Status: Under construction

General characteristics
- Class & type: Heritage-class cutter
- Displacement: 4,520 long tons (4,590 t) (full load)
- Length: 360 ft (110 m)
- Beam: 53 ft (16 m)
- Draft: 16 ft (4.9 m)
- Installed power: 4 x 940 eKW diesel generators
- Propulsion: 2 × 7,280 kW (9,760 hp) MAN 16V28/33D STC diesel engines at 1,000 rpm
- Speed: 24.5 knots (45.4 km/h; 28.2 mph)
- Range: 10,200 nmi (18,900 km; 11,700 mi) at 14 knots (26 km/h; 16 mph)
- Endurance: 60 days
- Boats & landing craft carried: 3 x Over-the-horizon boats
- Complement: 126
- Sensors & processing systems: Saab Sea Giraffe AN/SPS-77 AMB multi-mode naval radar; AN/UPX-46 IFF; AN/URN-32 TACAN; MK 20 Mod 1 EOSS; Link 22 tactical data link
- Electronic warfare & decoys: AN/SLQ-32C(V)6 electronic warfare system; 2 x MK 53 Mod 10 NULKA decoy launching systems
- Armament: 1 x MK 110 57mm gun a variant of the Bofors 57 mm gun and Gunfire Control System; 1 x BAE Systems Mk 38 Mod 3 25 mm gun with 7.62 mm co-axial gun; 2 x M2 Browning .50 caliber (12.7 mm) machine guns mounted on a MK 50 Stabilized Small Arms Mount (SSAM); 4 x Crew Served M2 Browning .50 caliber (12.7 mm) machine guns; Designed For but not with additional weapons
- Armor: Ballistic protection over critical areas and main gun
- Aircraft carried: One MH-60 or MH-65, plus sUAS
- Aviation facilities: Hangar and helipad

USCGC Chase (WMSM-916) is the second Heritage-class cutter of the United States Coast Guard (USCG).

== Development and design ==
Heritage-class cutters are the newest class of cutter in the USCG, bridging the capabilities of the Legend and the Sentinel classes. They are tasked to go against lightly armed hostiles in low-threat environments.

In February 2014, the USCG announced that Bollinger Shipyards, Eastern Shipbuilding, and General Dynamics Bath Iron Works had been awarded design contracts for the OPC. The Government Accountability Office denied contract appeals by VT Halter Marine and Ingalls Shipbuilding.

In September 2016, Eastern Shipbuilding of Panama City, Florida, was awarded a $110.3 million contract to build the first Offshore Patrol Cutter with an option to purchase eight additional cutters. On October 15, 2016 the Coast Guard issued a notice to proceed with the detailed design of the Offshore Patrol Cutter to Eastern Shipbuilding.

== Construction and career ==
Chase's first steel cutting started on 27 April 2020. She was scheduled to be laid down in 2021 and be completed by 2023.

== See also ==
- Integrated Deepwater System Program
