= Clarence Samuels =

United States Coast Guardsman

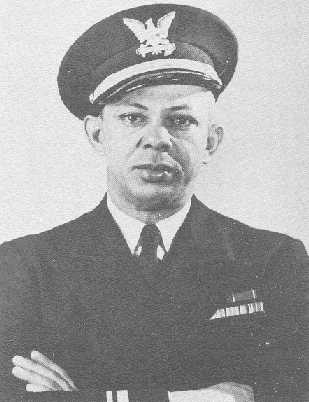
- Lieutenant Junior Grade Clarence Samuels; First Hispanic of African descent commanding officer of a Coast Guard vessel during wartime
- Born: Clarence Lorenzo Samuels; June 11, 1900; Bohio, Panama
- Died: April 4, 1983 (aged 82); Sonoma, California
- Military career
- Allegiance: United States
- Branch: United States Coast Guard
- Service years: 1920–1947
- Rank: Lieutenant Junior Grade
- Conflicts: World War II

Lieutenant Junior Grade Clarence Samuels (June 11, 1900 – April 4, 1983), was the first Hispanic American of African descent photographer in the United States Coast Guard, to command a cutter, as well as the first one to be a commanding officer of a Coast Guard vessel during wartime.

== Early years ==
Samuels was born and raised in the village of Bohio, Panama. By 1920, he had immigrated to the United States and joined the United States Coast Guard as an alien (citizen of a foreign country). Samuels first assignment as a seaman 2nd class was aboard USCGC Earp at Balboa Canal Zone, Panama. The term "Hispanic", which according to the United States Census Bureau is an ethnic term used to categorize any citizen or resident of the United States, of any racial background, and of any religion, who has at least one ancestor from the people of Spain or any of the Spanish-speaking countries of the Americas, was not used until the 1970s, therefore Latinos were classified by race either as "Whites" or as "Blacks". Samuels was classified as Black by the U.S. Coast Guard and like so many Black Coast Guardsmen before and after him, he was soon initiated into mess-man duty.

== Military career ==
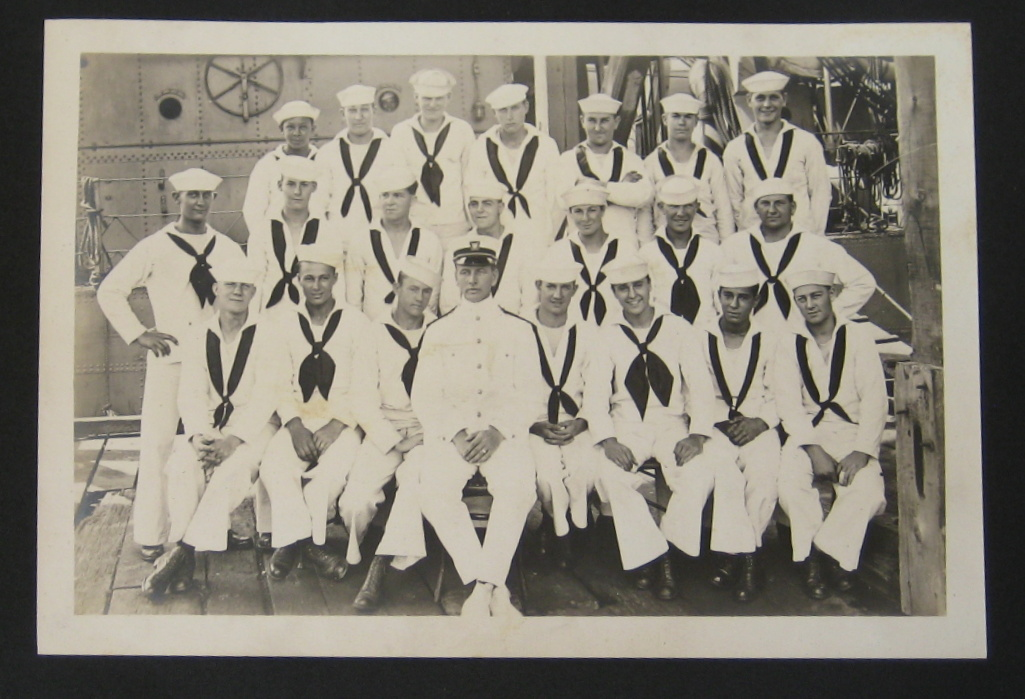
Clarence Samuels on board USCGC Earp in 1921 (Back Row - Top left)

Segregation was the common practice in all the services, as indeed it was throughout much of American society. From 1920 to 1928, the Coast Guard was engaged in the apprehension of the rum runners seeking to circumvent the Prohibition laws. Samuels served aboard various vessels, among them USCGC Earp (twice), USCGC Swift, USCGC Shawnee, USCGC Mojave and USCGC Argus during those years. He became a naturalized citizen of the United States on July 21, 1923. On July 18, 1928, he assumed command of Coast Guard Patrol Boat AB-15, operating out of Savannah, Georgia.

On September 8, 1930, Samuels was assigned to Pea Island Life-Saving Station, a lifeboat station manned totally by African-Americans, on the Outer Banks of North Carolina. On June 16, 1933, was promoted to boatswain's mate, 1st class (lifesaving). He reported to the Coast Guard Depot at Curtis Bay, Maryland, on July 14, 1935, and served as the personal driver of Rear Admiral Russell R. Waesche, the Coast Guard Commandant. On May 8, 1936, he was promoted to boatswain's mate, first class. On May 12, 1939, Samuels was appointed a chief photographer's mate, becoming not only the first Hispanic of African descent photographer in the Coast Guard, but also the second photographer in the entire history of the service.

== World War II ==
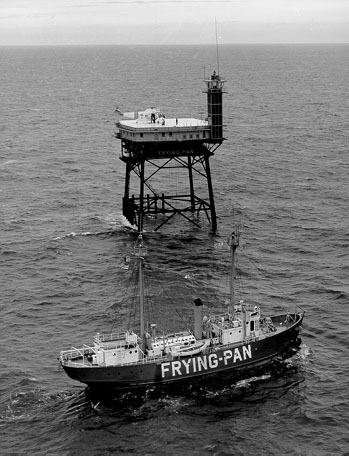
"Frying Pan" Lightship No. 115

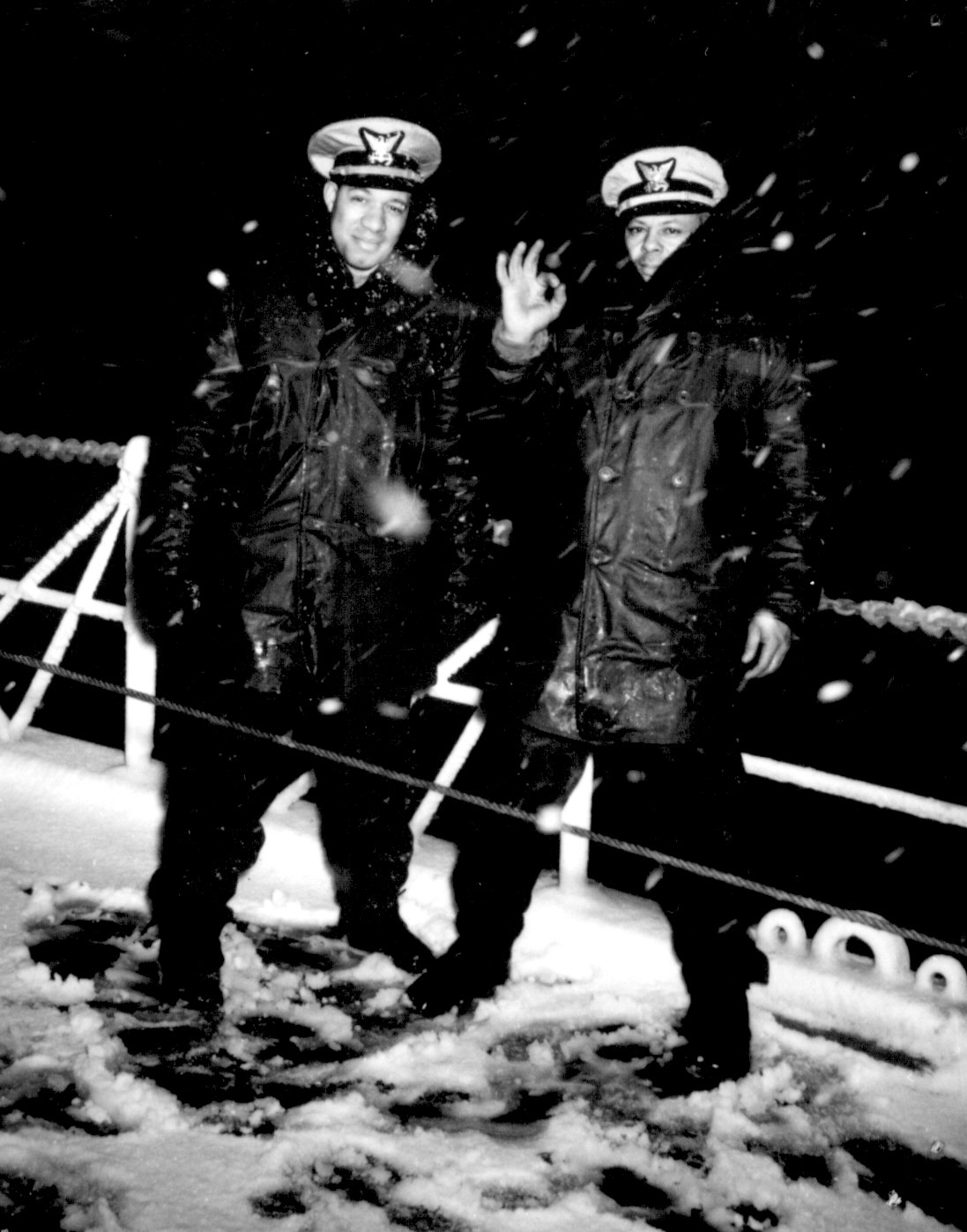
Clarence Samuels (right) and Lt. (j.g.) Joseph Jenkins aboard Sea Cloud on the North Atlantic patrol.

A statute of 1915, provided that during wartime or "whenever the President may so direct" the Coast Guard would operate as part of the Navy, subject to the orders of the Secretary of the Navy. At the direction of the President the Coast Guard passed to the control of the Secretary of the Navy on November 1, 1941, and so remained until January 1, 1946. On September 1, 1942, Samuels received the following notification from Secretary of the Navy Frank Knox: "Pursuant to the provision of an Act of Congress approved July 24, 1941, (Public Law No. 188 - 77th Congress), the President of the United States on this date appoints you a Boatswain in the Coast Guard for temporary service to rank from the First of September 1942", thus Samuels became a warrant officer. He was then reassigned to the Coast Guard Training Station at Manhattan Beach, Brooklyn, New York and served as the Director of Visual Signaling for Recruits. His position was one of great responsibility because it was part of a major innovation in the Coast Guard's manpower policy. For the first time a number of African Americans, approximately 1.6 percent of the Coast Guard's total enlisted complement, would undergo regular recruit and specialized training. On August 14, 1943, Samuels was sent to the North Atlantic where he served aboard the USS Sea Cloud along with another black officer Joseph C. Jenkins, a vessel which operated as a weather station. Samuels, who became the damage control officer on Sea Cloud, was promoted to the rank of lieutenant junior grade on August 31.

On July 29, 1944, he assumed command of Lightship No. 115, Frying Pan, operating in the Panama Sea Frontier. Thus, he became the first Hispanic of African descent to command a cutter, as well as the first one to be a commanding officer of a Coast Guard vessel during wartime. A lightship, is a ship which acts as a lighthouse. They are used in waters that are too deep or otherwise unsuitable for lighthouse construction. On May 18, 1945, he assumed command of Lightship No. 91 until August 2, 1945, when he was assigned as commanding officer of USCGC Sweetgum.

== Later years ==
On June 25, 1946, his lieutenancy was revoked and he was reduced in rank to chief photographer's mate. This type of action was not uncommon in the military after the war since it was a part of the massive demobilization of the Coast Guard following the end of hostilities. He was, however, appointed temporarily to chief boatswain's mate. He served aboard the buoy tender Tulip at Manila, Luzon Island, Philippines Islands in his last year in the military retiring on September 1, 1947, after 27 years of active service. Samuels resided in the Philippines for some time until he decided to return to the United States and make his home in California. Lieutenant (j.g.) Samuels died 1983 at his home in Sonoma, California.

== Military awards and decorations ==
Among Samuels's military decorations are the following:

1st Row	American Defense Service Medal	American Campaign Medal	World War II Victory Medal

== See also ==
- Hispanics in the United States Coast Guard
- Hispanic Americans in World War II
