= Ronald J. Rabago =

American coast guard admiral

Ronald J. Rábago
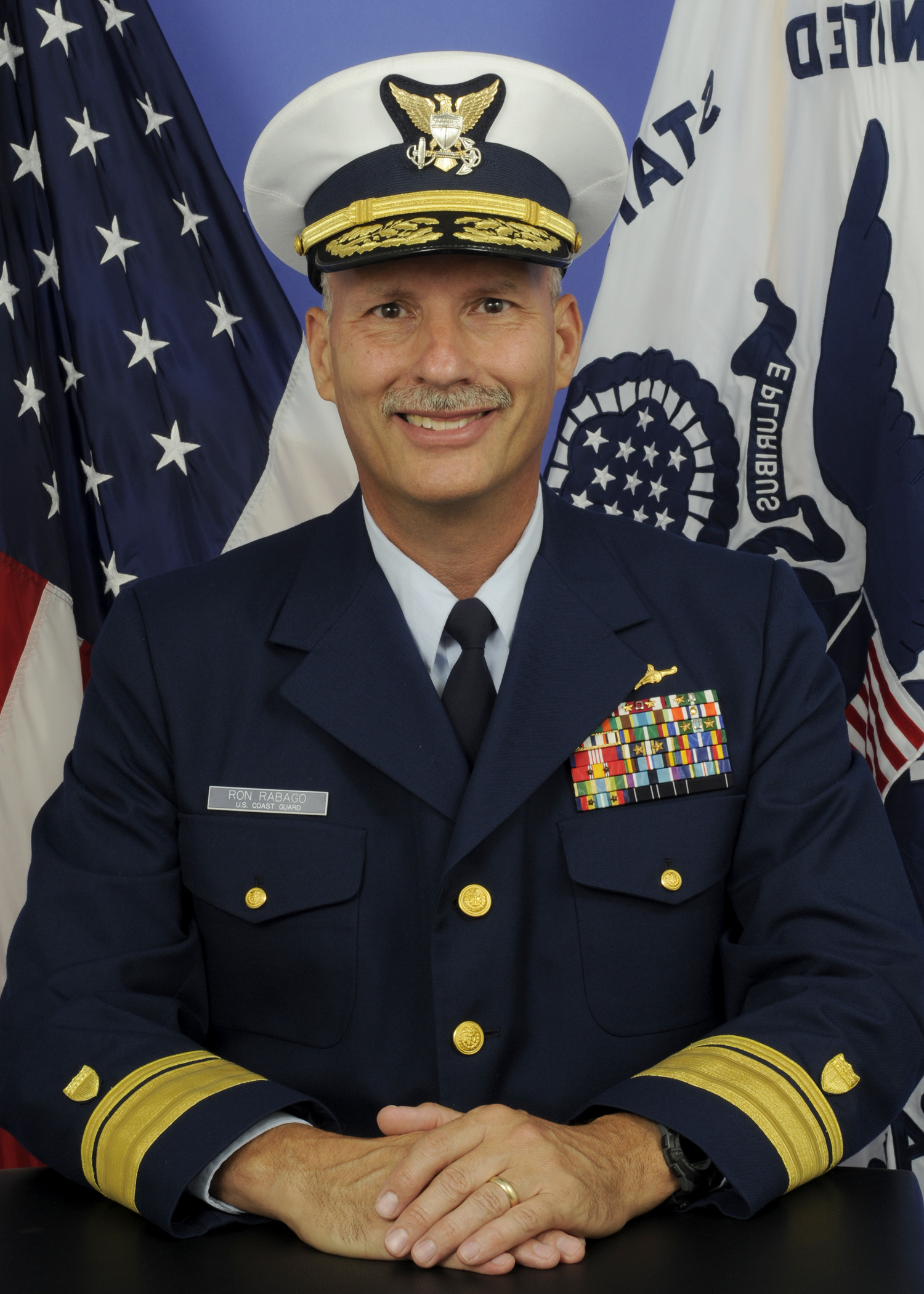
- Rear Admiral Ronald J. Rábago; First Hispanic promoted to Rear Admiral in the United States Coast Guard
- Alma mater: University of Michigan
- Military career
- Allegiance: United States of America
- Branch: Coast Guard
- Service years: 1978–2014
- Rank: Rear Admiral
- Commands: Coast Guard Program Executive Officer (PEO) and Director of Acquisition Programs (Deepwater Program).
- Awards: Legion of Merit w/3* Meritorious Service Medal w/2*

Ronald James Rábago is a retired United States Coast Guard rear admiral who in 2006 became the first person of Hispanic American descent to be promoted to flag rank in the United States Coast Guard. He retired as the assistant commandant for engineering and logistics and the United States Coast Guard's chief engineer in 2014.

== Early life and career ==
Rábago was born in Germany and entered the United States Coast Guard Academy upon his graduation from high school in Laredo, Texas. In 1978, he graduated from the academy, where he earned a Bachelor of Science degree in ocean engineering and was commissioned as an ensign. His first assignment was aboard the Honolulu-based USCGC Mellon as a student engineer.

== USCG assistant commandant for engineering and logistics ==
Ronald J. Rábago was the Coast Guard's assistant commandant for engineering and logistics (CG-4). As the Coast Guard's chief engineer, he was responsible for all naval, civil, aeronautical, and industrial engineering, logistics, and environmental and energy management programs for the Coast Guard's $22 billion capital plant, which includes 23,000 facilities, 250 ships, 1,800 boats, and 200 aircraft. Responsible for executing an annual budget of $1 billion, he also led over 5,000 personnel at Coast Guard Headquarters and the three Coast Guard Logistics Centers: the Aviation Logistics Center (ALC) in Elizabeth City, North Carolina; the Shore Infrastructure Logistics Center (SILC) in Norfolk, Virginia; and, the Surface Forces Logistics Center (SFLC) in Baltimore, Maryland.

== Past assignments ==
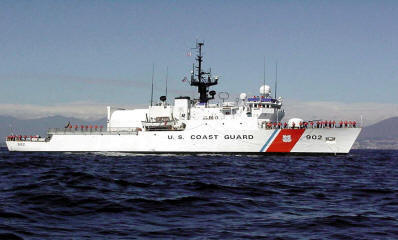
USCGC Tampa

Rábago's other assignments included the following:

- Engineer officer on board the CGC TAMPA; and engineering and deck marine inspector at the Marine Safety Office Port Arthur, Texas.
- Port engineer at the Ship Repair Detachment in Portsmouth and later as executive officer of the Naval Engineering Support Unit (NESU), at Portsmouth, Virginia;
- Executive officer of the CGC Boutwell, in Alameda, California; Type Desk Manager in the Vessel Repair Division of the Maintenance and Logistics Command Atlantic on Governors Island, New York;
- Commanding Officer CGC Tampa from 1997 to 1999;
- Chief of the Fifth District Law Enforcement Branch; commanding officer of USCGC Tampa, in Portsmouth, Virginia;
- Industrial manager and then the commanding officer of the Coast Guard Yard in Baltimore, Maryland. Rabago assumed command of the U.S. Coast Guard Yard in Baltimore. He assumed command of the yard, following the retirement of Captain William S. Cheever.
- Deputy commander of the Maintenance and Logistics Command Atlantic in Norfolk, Virginia;
- Rábago served as the director of personnel management at the U.S. Coast Guard Headquarters in Washington, D.C. In 2006, Rábago became the first person of Hispanic descent to be promoted to flag rank in the United States Coast Guard.
- On July 13, 2007, became the program executive officer of the U.S. Coast Guard's largest recapitalization and modernization initiative, the $24 billion, 25-year programmed Integrated Deepwater System Program. The Integrated Deepwater System Program (IDS Program), or Deepwater, is the 25-year program to recapitalize the United States Coast Guard's aircraft, ships, logistics, and command and control systems. The $24 billion program includes equipment that will be used across all missions. Rábago not only acted as program executive officer of Deepwater, but also later as director of all Coast Guard acquisition programs. His office oversaw all major acquisitions of cutters, aircraft, C4ISR and boats.

== Academic education ==
In 1983, he attended the University of Michigan and earned Master of Science degrees in naval architecture & marine engineering and mechanical engineering. In 1995, he was named the Coast Guard's "Engineer of the Year" and in 1996, he attended the Naval War College, where he earned a third master's degree in national security and strategic studies. Licensed Professional Engineer. Certified Level III DHS Program Manager.

== Written work ==
"Joint Migration Operations: A Growing Mission Area"; This paper explores the growing Joint mission area of migrant and refugee operations both as a single mission Joint Task Force (JTF) and as part of existing JTF Operations. Authors: Ronald J. Rabago; Naval War College, Newport, Rhode Island.

== Memberships ==
Member — American Society of Naval Engineers Organization Council of the society.

== Military awards and recognitions ==
Among Rábago's military awards and recognitions are the following:

- Legion of Merit w/3*
- Meritorious Service Medal w/2*
- Coast Guard Commendation Medal w/1*
- Coast Guard Achievement Medal
- Commandant's Letter of Commendation Ribbon
- Secretary of Transportation Outstanding Unit Award
- Coast Guard Unit Commendation
- Coast Guard Meritorious Unit Commendation w/2*
- Meritorious Team Commendation
- Coast Guard "E" Ribbon w/2*
- Coast Guard Bicentennial Unit Commendation
- National Defense Service Medal w/2*
- Armed Forces Expeditionary Medal
- Global War on Terrorism Service Medal
- Armed Forces Service Medal
- Humanitarian Service Medal
- Special Operations Service Ribbon
- Coast Guard Sea Service Ribbon w/2*
- Coast Guard Rifle Marksmanship Ribbon
- Coast Guard Pistol Marksmanship Ribbon

Badges

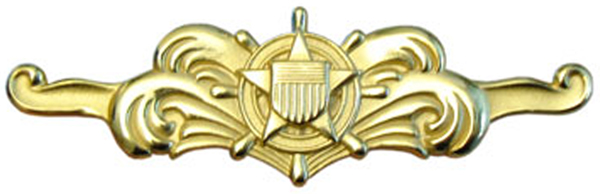
- Cutterman Officer Badge

== See also ==
- Hispanics in the United States Coast Guard
- U.S. Coast Guard Cutters (List of United States Coast Guard cutters)
