= Joseph C. Jenkins =

Lieutenant, Junior Grade Joseph C. Jenkins
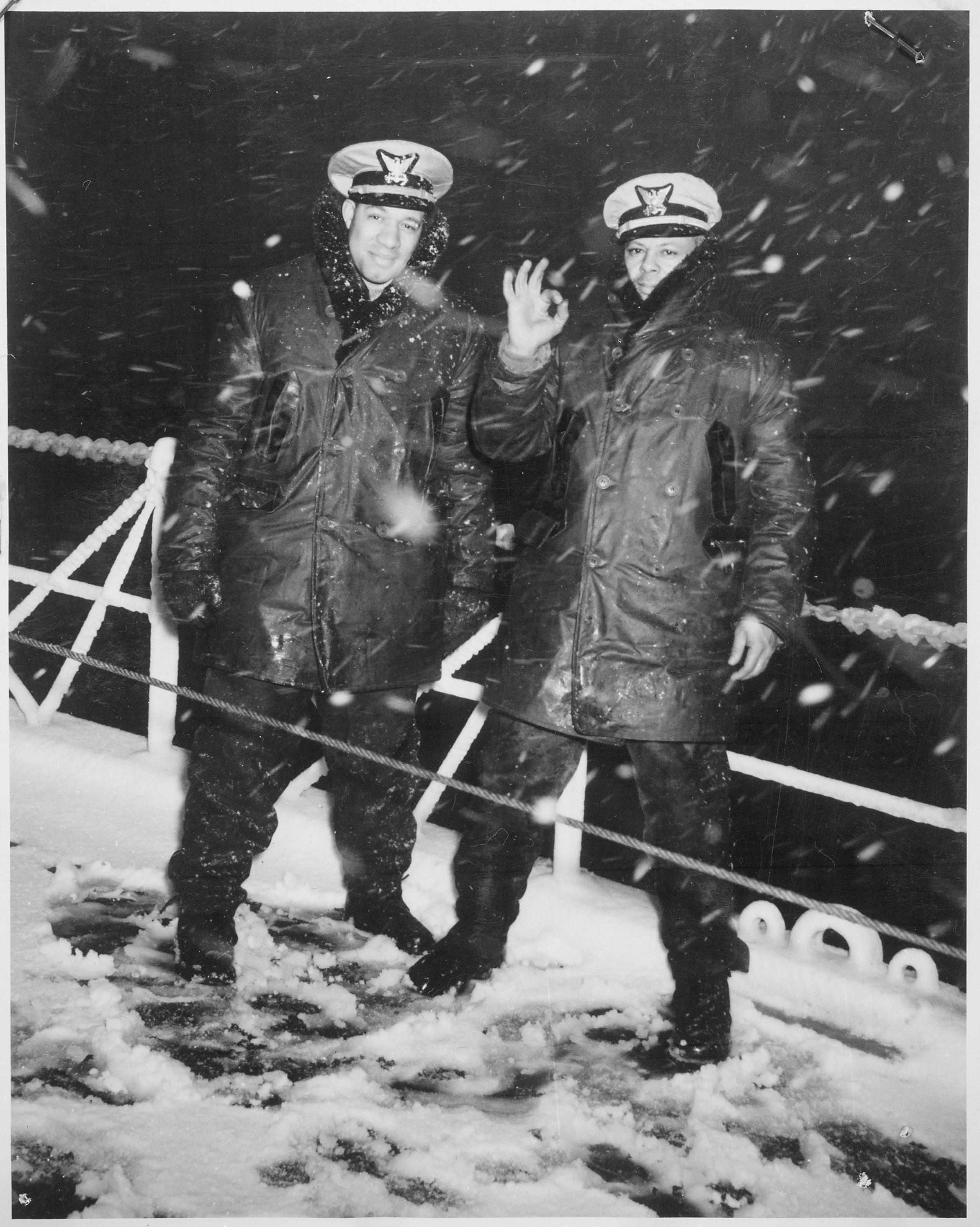
- Joseph Jenkins and Clarence Samuels aboard the Sea Cloud, 1944
- Born: August 8, 1914; Detroit, Michigan
- Died: 1959 (aged 44–45); Detroit, Michigan
- Education: University of Michigan, B.S. 1937
- Spouse: Hertha Priest Jenkins
- Children: 3
- Military career
- Branch: United States Coast Guard
- Rank: Lieutenant, Junior Grade

Joseph Charles Jenkins was the first African American commissioned officer in the United States Coast Guard. He was commissioned an Ensign 14 April 1943 after completing the Reserve Officer Training Course.

== Early life ==
Jenkins was born 8 August 1914 in Detroit Michigan to Elmer Jenkins (a ragtime horn player) and Nora Jenkins (a music graduate of Wilberforce University) and was partly raised by his grandparents. He earned a civil engineering degree in 1937 from the University of Michigan and then worked for the Michigan State Highway Department as an engineer. He completed a business administration degree by correspondence from Alexander Hamilton Business University of New York.

== Coast Guard ==
On 15 June 1942, he enlisted in the Coast Guard and earned his rating as a boatswain's mate first class and eventually earned chief. He served as a recruiter in Detroit and was promoted to warrant officer 1 September 1942. He then applied to the Reserve Officer Training Course (which would become Officers Candidate School or OCS). He was accepted in early 1943. He was commissioned 14 April 1943.

In December 1943, the USCG desegregated the USS Sea Cloud (IX-99) and LTJG Jenkins and Clarence Samuels were the only two black officers under Lt. Carlton Skinner. The Sea Cloud was part of Task Force 24 on anti-submarine duty as a weather patrol ship. The weather observations were handled by the U.S. Weather Bureau, but the ship was sailed by the mixed crew. The ship was credited with assisting a navy crew in destroying an enemy submarine. In February 1945, the Navy (which the Coast Guard was commanded by in wartime) issued regulations authorizing up to 10 percent of a ship's crew to be African American rated sailors.

In January 1945, Jenkins would take command of the a Coast Guard cutter in Boston. He was later transferred to the Pacific to serve on the USS Hoquiam another integrated USCG ship and Lt. Commander Skinner was its captain.

He was discharged from the Coast Guard on 11 July 1947 and returned home to Detroit.

== Later life ==
After his discharge, Jenkins, who had married Hertha Priest in Roxbury, Massachusetts on 28 October 1944 returned to the Michigan State Highway Department where he oversaw construction of the Detroit Crosstown Superhighway and the Willow Run Industrial Expressway. His wife became Central High School principal who became Region 7 Assistant Superintendent and Central Staff Administrator in School and Community Relations for Detroit Public Schools.

Jenkins died of kidney failure in 1959 at the age of 44.
