= Joseph B. Aviles Sr. =

Puerto Rican United States military officer

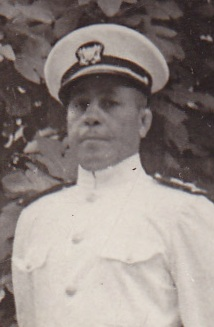
- Born: José Blas Avilés; February 3, 1897; Naranjito, Captaincy General of Puerto Rico
- Died: February 22, 1990 (aged 93); Columbia, Maryland
- Burial place: Baltimore National Cemetery Baltimore, Maryland
- Military career
- Allegiance: United States of America
- Branch: U.S. Navy (1915–1922); U.S. Coast Guard (1925–1946)
- Rank: Chief warrant officer
- Conflicts: World War I World War II
- Awards: World War I Victory Medal; American Defense Medal; American Campaign Medal; World War II Victory Medal

Joseph B. Aviles Sr. (February 3, 1897 – February 22, 1990), served in the United States Navy and later in the United States Coast Guard. On September 28, 1925, Aviles became the first Hispanic Chief Petty Officer in the United States Coast Guard. During World War II he received a war-time promotion to Chief Warrant Officer, becoming the first Hispanic to reach that level as well.

== Early life and education ==
Aviles was born José Blas Avilés in a farm near the town of Naranjito, Puerto Rico, when the island was still a Spanish colony. He was a native inhabitant of Puerto Rico and a Spanish subject, though not of the Peninsula (Spain). He was residing in the island on April 11, 1899, the date of the proclamation of the Treaty of Paris of 1898 which ceded the island to the United States. One of the conditions of the treaty was the transfer by cession of the allegiance of the islanders to the United States. In 1907, at the age of 10, Avilés was placed in the Mission of the Immaculate Virgin orphanage, at Mount Loretto, Staten Island. There he received his primary and secondary education and participated in the institution's cadet program, thus his fascination with military life at a young age.

== Career ==
Avilés joined the United States Navy in 1915 and served seven years and eight months, eventually reaching the rank of chief gunner's mate. During the years that he served in the U.S. Navy, the United States Congress passed the Jones-Shafroth Act (1917) which conferred United States citizenship on all citizens of Puerto Rico. On September 28, 1925, he entered the United States Coast Guard with the rank of chief gunner's mate and served for two years before re-enlisting on September 11, 1928. That same year he met and married Florence Powell, adopting her son Harvey from a previous marriage. During the time that he served in the Coast Guard, Avilés became the first Hispanic-American to be advanced to chief petty officer and later to warrant officer, on March 27, 1943.

Upon the outbreak of World War II, Avilés received a war-time promotion to Chief Warrant Officer (November 27, 1944), thus becoming the first Hispanic American to reach that level as well. The Chief Warrant Officers in the Coast Guard may be found in command of larger "small-boat" stations and patrol boats, as specialists and supervisors in other technical areas, and as special agents in the Coast Guard Investigative Service (CGIS). They wear insignia essentially like that of their U.S. Navy counterparts, but add the USCG shield between the rank insignia and the specialty mark, as Coast Guard commissioned officers do with their rank insignia. Like their U.S. Navy counterparts, candidates for the rank of chief warrant officer must typically be serving in the chief petty officer rates, however, the U.S. Coast Guard also permits selection of petty officer first class in the top 50% of the advancement list to chief petty officer. Like the U.S. Navy, the U.S. Coast Guard also does not use the rank of Warrant Officer (WO1). Aviles spent most of the World War II years training recruits at the U.S. Coast Guard Training Station (where Flagler College is now located) in St. Augustine, Florida.

== Later life and death ==
Avilés retired from the U.S. Coast Guard on July 27, 1946, and worked as a security guard at a hospital in Baltimore until 1962, when he retired at the age of 65. Aviles died at his residence in Columbia, Maryland, on February 22, 1990. He was buried with full military honors in Plot D O 2220A of the Baltimore National Cemetery at Catonsville, Maryland. He was survived by four of his five children, Joseph B. Aviles Jr.(deceased), a nuclear physicist at the Nucleonics Division, United States Naval Research Laboratory, Raymond (now deceased), Frank (now deceased), Alice and by his stepson Harvey Aviles (deceased), a graduate of the USCG Academy who also served in World War II.

== Legacy ==
The Fast Response Cutter and Engineering Building at the United States Coast Guard Station San Juan was posthumously named after CWO-2 Joseph B. Aviles Sr.

In 2020 Joseph B. Aviles Sr. was posthumously inducted to the Puerto Rico Veterans Hall of Fame.

== Decorations ==
Joseph B. Aviles Sr.' ribbon bar included :

1st Row	World War I Victory Medal		
2nd Row	American Defense Service Medal	American Campaign Medal	World War II Victory Medal

== See also ==
- List of Puerto Ricans
- List of Puerto Rican military personnel
- Puerto Ricans in World War I
- Puerto Ricans in World War II
- Hispanic Americans in World War II
- Hispanics in the United States Coast Guard
