= USS Chase (DD-323) =

Clemson-class destroyer

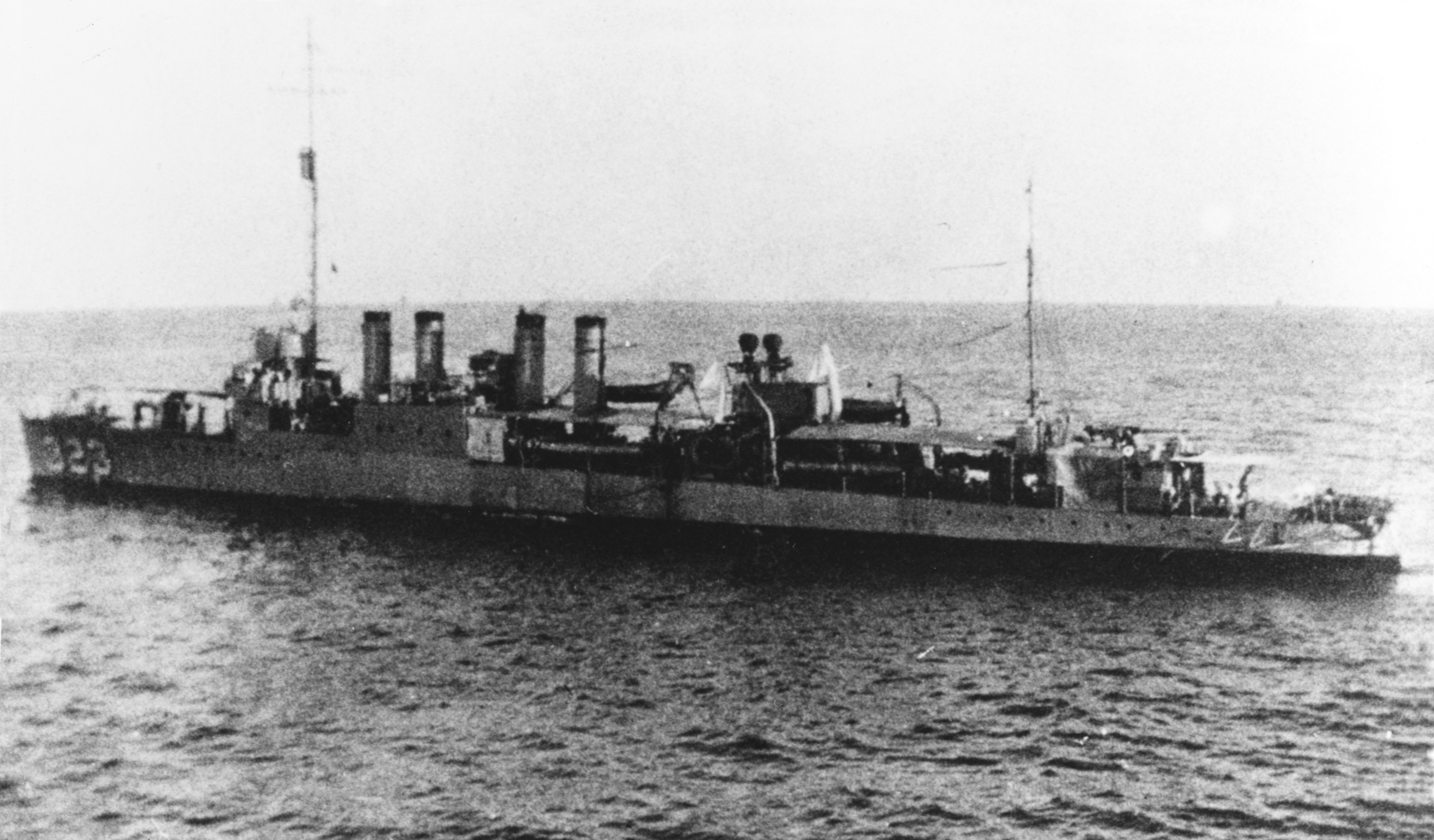
- USS Chase (DD-323) underway at sea during the 1920s.

History

United States
- Namesake: Reuben Chase
- Builder: Bethlehem Shipbuilding Corporation, Union Iron Works, San Francisco
- Laid down: 5 May 1919
- Launched: 2 September 1919
- Commissioned: 10 March 1921
- Decommissioned: 15 May 1930
- Stricken: 13 August 1930
- Fate: Sold for scrap, 1931

General characteristics
- Class & type: Clemson-class destroyer
- Displacement: 1,290 long tons (1,311 t) (standard); 1,389 long tons (1,411 t) (deep load)
- Length: 314 ft 4 in (95.8 m)
- Beam: 30 ft 11 in (9.42 m)
- Draught: 10 ft 3 in (3.1 m)
- Installed power: 27,000 shp (20,000 kW); 4 water-tube boilers
- Propulsion: 2 shafts, 2 steam turbines
- Speed: 35 knots (65 km/h; 40 mph) (design)
- Range: 2,500 nautical miles (4,600 km; 2,900 mi) at 20 knots (37 km/h; 23 mph) (design)
- Complement: 6 officers, 108 enlisted men
- Armament: 4 × single 4-inch (102 mm) guns; 2 × single 1-pounder AA guns or; 2 × single 3-inch (76 mm) guns; 4 × triple 21 inch (533 mm) torpedo tubes; 2 × depth charge rails

USS Chase (DD-323) was a Clemson-class destroyer built for the United States Navy during World War I.

== Namesake ==
Reuben Chase was born on 23 June 1754. He joined USS Ranger as a seaman in 1777 and served during John Paul Jones' daring raid into British waters. Chase was appointed a midshipman on USS Bonhomme Richard on 18 March 1779, and took part in the historic victory over HMS Serapis on 23 September 1779.

== Description ==
The Clemson class was a repeat of the preceding Wickes class although more fuel capacity was added. The ships displaced 1,290 long tons (1,311 t) at standard load and 1,389 long tons (1,411 t) at deep load. They had an overall length of 314 feet 4 inches (95.8 m), a beam of 30 feet 11 inches (9.4 m) and a draught of 10 feet 3 inches (3.1 m). They had a crew of 6 officers and 108 enlisted men.

Performance differed radically between the ships of the class, often due to poor workmanship. The Clemson class was powered by two steam turbines, each driving one propeller shaft, using steam provided by four water-tube boilers. The turbines were designed to produce a total of 27,000 shaft horsepower (20,000 kW) intended to reach a speed of 35 knots (65 km/h; 40 mph). The ships carried a maximum of 371 long tons (377 t) of fuel oil which was intended gave them a range of 2,500 nautical miles (4,600 km; 2,900 mi) at 20 knots (37 km/h; 23 mph).

The ships were armed with four 4-inch (102 mm) guns in single mounts and were fitted with two 1-pounder guns for anti-aircraft defense. In many ships a shortage of 1-pounders caused them to be replaced by 3-inch (76 mm) guns. Their primary weapon, though, was their torpedo battery of a dozen 21 inch (533 mm) torpedo tubes in four triple mounts. They also carried a pair of depth charge rails. A "Y-gun" depth charge thrower was added to many ships.

== Construction and career ==
Chase, named for Reuben Chase, was launched 2 September 1919 by Bethlehem Shipbuilding Corporation, San Francisco, California; sponsored by Mrs. J. A. Annear; and commissioned 10 March 1921. Cruising primarily along the west coast of the United States, Chase took part in training operations and fleet maneuvers. She took part in the Presidential Fleet Review at Seattle, Washington, in 1923, and in 1927 cruised in Nicaraguan waters to protect American interests while civil war took place in that country. In 1928 she cruised to Hawaii with members of the Naval Reserve on board for training, and in 1929 she operated off San Diego, California with Saratoga (CV-3) and Lexington (CV-2) assisting the development of US carrier aviation.

Designated for scrapping under the provisions of the London Naval Treaty, Chase was decommissioned at San Diego 15 May 1930, and broken up during 1931.
