= Heritage-class cutter =

United States Coast Guard ship class

- Computer graphic illustration of the Heritage-class cutter provided by Eastern Shipbuilding.

Class overview
- Name: Heritage class
- Builders: Eastern Shipbuilding, Austal USA
- Preceded by: Famous and Reliance classes
- Cost: $648M per ship for 25 ships (2022 dollars)
- Planned: 9 (possibly up to 23, accounting for the cancelled ESG cutters)
- Building: 4 (2 from ESG, 2 from Austal)
- Canceled: 2 temporary stop work orders on third and fourth hulls of the class at Eastern Shipbuilding

General characteristics
- Type: United States Coast Guard Cutter
- Displacement: 4,500 long tons (full load)
- Length: 360 ft (110 m)
- Beam: 54 ft (16 m)
- Draft: 17 ft (5.2 m)
- Installed power: 4 x 940 eKW diesel generators
- Propulsion: 2 × 7,280 kW (9,760 hp) Fairbanks Morse 16V28/33D STC diesel engines at 1,000 rpm
- Speed: 22.5 knots (41.7 km/h; 25.9 mph)
- Range: 10,200 nmi (18,900 km; 11,700 mi) at 14 knots (26 km/h; 16 mph)
- Endurance: 60 days
- Boats & landing craft carried: 3 x Over-the-horizon boats
- Complement: 126
- Sensors & processing systems: Saab Sea Giraffe AN/SPS-77 AMB multi-mode naval radar; AN/UPX-46 IFF; AN/URN-32 TACAN; MK 20 Mod 1 EOSS; Link 22 Tactical Data Link
- Electronic warfare & decoys: AN/SLQ-32C(V)6 Electronic Warfare System; 2 x MK 53 Mod 10 NULKA Decoy Launching Systems
- Armament: 1 x MK 110 57 mm gun a variant of the Bofors 57 mm gun and Gunfire Control System; 1 x BAE Systems Mk 38 Mod 3 25 mm gun with 7.62 mm co-axial gun; 2 x M2 Browning .50 caliber (12.7 mm) machine guns mounted on a MK 50 Stabilized Small Arms Mount (SSAM); 4 x crew-served M2 Browning .50 caliber (12.7 mm) machine guns; Designed For but not with additional weapons
- Armor: Ballistic protection over critical areas and main gun
- Aircraft carried: One MH-60 or MH-65, plus sUAS
- Aviation facilities: Flight deck, hangar for all aircraft

The Heritage-class cutter, also known as the Offshore Patrol Cutter and the Maritime Security Cutter, Medium, is a cutter class of the United States Coast Guard (USCG), developed as part of the Integrated Deepwater System Program and built by Eastern Shipbuilding and Austal USA. Construction of the first vessel in the class began in January 2019. As they are completed, it is expected that they will replace 270-foot (82 m) Famous- and 210-foot (64 m) Reliance-class Medium Endurance Cutters.

== Mission ==
The Heritage-class cutters will perform various USCG missions which include but are not limited to PWCS (ports, waterways, and coastal security), defense operations, maritime law enforcement (drug/migrant interdiction and other law enforcement), search and rescue, marine safety, and environment protection. For defense operations, the WMSM will meet a range of roles from theater security cooperation to deploying with an expeditionary strike group (ESG) or supporting a combatant commander in various ways. The cutters will also support Arctic operations.

== Design ==
The Heritage-class cutters are the newest class of cutter in the USCG, bridging the capabilities of the Legend and Sentinel-class cutters. The design is based on Vard Marine's VARD 7 110 offshore patrol vessel design. The cutters will be classified to American Bureau of Shipping Naval Vessel Rules with USCG addendum and will be built with a mix of military and commercial standards.

The cutters will have the ability to install additional armament and systems to augment their capabilities, if required to conduct operations in higher threat environments in support of national security objectives or other missions. The cutters' construction will provide combat survivability against various threats, including combatant-type compartmentalization, uninterruptible power supply to vital combat and damage control systems and sensors, and ballistic materials over critical areas for protection against small caliber weapons and shrapnel.

The cutters have increased interoperability with other USCG and Department of Defense assets, which provides increased communications and similar systems with other combatants such as the Mk 110 and the Mk 38, weapons used in both the United States Navy (USN) and the USCG. This ensures that the Heritage class has the required interoperability to execute naval warfare tasks with the USN. These cutters have space and weight reserved for additional weapons systems which would allow them to carry out wartime missions.

=== Propulsion ===
Rolls-Royce will supply the USCG Heritage-class fleet's controllable-pitch propellers (CPP), shaft lines, and Promas rudders, which offer increased propulsive efficiency and improved maneuverability. The Promas rudder, combined with the water-soluble polyalkylene glycol (PAG) lubricant used in the CPP system, delivers an efficient and environmentally friendly propulsion solution. Rolls-Royce will supply bow thrusters, steering gear, fin stabilizers, and MTU marine generator sets.

Leonardo DRS is providing a small Hybrid Electric Drive for operation at low speed.

=== Combat suite ===
The Saab Sea Giraffe AN/SPS-77(V)3 multi-mode medium-range naval radar system provides three-dimensional air and surface search functions. The multi-mode naval radar provides Gun Weapon System cueing and supports the cutter's self-defense and limited air defense capability. The cutters are equipped with the AN/SLQ-32C(V)6 electronic warfare system, which is a scaled down and lower cost version of the AN/SLQ-32(V)6 SEWIP Block 2 system. The Heritage-class cutters are equipped with the same 220 rpm Bofors 57 mm gun as mounted on the USN's Littoral combat ships and Constellation-class frigates, as well as the USCG's Legend-class cutters.

The missile defense duties are handled by the MK 53 decoy systems, also used on the Legend-class cutters. The Heritage-class cutters weapon and defense systems provide anti-surface capability, limited air-defense capability, and the capability to provide naval gunfire support. The cutter's .50 caliber mounts and Mk 38/Mk 110 combination give the cutter protection against fast attack craft. The WMSM will have the capability and equipment to escape from a CBRNE and/or TIC contaminated environment.

== Program cost ==
In a 2022 Life Cycle Cost Estimate, the Coast Guard estimated total program acquisition cost for 25 ships to be $17.6B, consisting of $12.5B of program costs and $5.2B of non-program costs, according to a June 2023 GAO report. This cost would indicate $704M per ship as a crude bottom-line number. The report found that costs estimates had risen by $5.1B since 2012.

The $5.2B of non-program costs consist of $1.4 billion for facilities (homeports and shore infrastructure), $2.1 billion for government-furnished equipment, $1.0 billion for outfitting and post-delivery, and approximately $0.7 billion unspecified costs. Subtracting the cost of shore facilities ($1.4B) gives an acquisition cost of $16.2B, or $648M per hull.

However, the per-ship cost of Austal hulls may be cheaper. Subtracting the $659M in relief funding for Eastern Shipbuilding Group (ESG) and amortizing the $176M in detailed design work for Austal gives a per-hull cost of $631M per ship.

The Austal portion of their 11-ship run is $292M per hull, prior to any government-furnished equipment or ancillary costs. The cost of Austal's bid was lower than ESG's bid by a material amount, leading to Austal winning the contract despite ESG being more competitive in other aspects. Adding to this hull cost the cost of GFE, outfitting, and other non-program costs results in $181M in unaccounted-for programmed costs, if the $631M per-ship cost is to be believed.

The July 2025 cancellation of 2 of Eastern Shipbuilding's 4 ships, reducing the apparent program from 25 to 23 ships, will result in higher program costs per ship if those 2 hulls are not reordered at a later date. The GAO report also notes that awarding ships 16–25 to a new shipbuilder, rather than to Austal, would result in additional detailed design work and would raise the lifecycle costs of the fleet by introducing an additional variant with reduced commonality.

== History ==
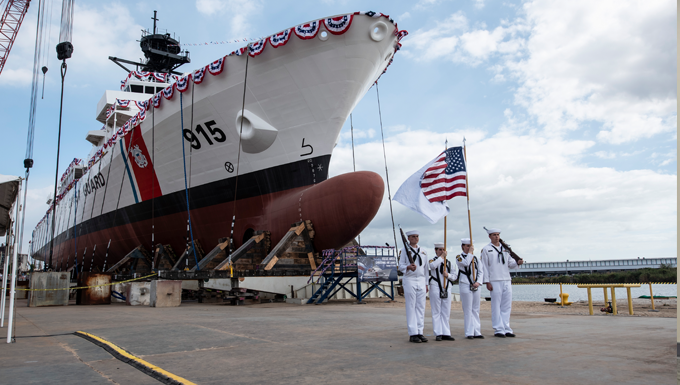
Argus prior to her launch, 2023

The cutter was originally proposed to replace aging medium endurance cutters with more capable and technologically advanced cutters as a part of the Integrated Deepwater System Program. By 2010 and 2011 some commentators speculated that the entire program was vulnerable to cancellation on budgetary grounds, because of the long delay in finalizing a preliminary design.

A bill passed by the United States Congress in November 2011, imposed conditions on the USCG's capital expenditures, that revolved around the design of the Offshore Patrol Cutter, granting greater certainty to the project.

By December 2011 plans for the cutter started to become more concrete. Plans to include a stern launching ramp, as on the National Security Cutters and the Fast Response Cutters, had been eliminated on budgetary grounds.

In February 2014, the USCG announced that Bollinger Shipyards, Eastern Shipbuilding, and General Dynamics Bath Iron Works had been awarded design contracts for the OPC. The Government Accountability Office denied contract appeals by VT Halter Marine and Ingalls Shipbuilding.

In September 2016, Eastern Shipbuilding of Panama City, Florida, was awarded a $110.3 million contract to build the first Offshore Patrol Cutter with an option to purchase eight additional cutters. In October 2016 the Coast Guard issued a notice to proceed with the detailed design of the Offshore Patrol Cutter to Eastern Shipbuilding.

The first Offshore Patrol Cutter was originally expected to be delivered in late 2022. In total, the 25-ship deal could be worth up to $10.5 billion, according to 2012 Coast Guard estimates. In July 2017, Eastern Shipbuilding completed its Initial Critical Design Review for the Offshore Patrol Cutter. This leads to the Final Critical Design Review for the Offshore Patrol Cutter.

In August 2017, it was announced that the OPC's will be named "Heritage class" and the first 11 OPCs were named. The Heritage-class OPCs are named after cutters that played a significant role in the Coast Guard's history.

In September 2017, the USCG exercised a fixed-price option to procure long lead time materials for the first Heritage-class cutter. The total value was $41.68 million and covered various materials and parts needed for the engines, switchboards and generators, steering and propeller components, and control systems. This included meeting Coast Guard requirements and meeting all American Bureau of Shipping Naval Vessel Rules. It is the first US Coast Guard cutter ever constructed to meet these very specific requirements. The construction of the first cutter, USCGC Argus (WMSM-915), was planned to begin in the late summer of 2018, with delivery in August 2021.

In September 2018, the USCG exercised the contract option to begin construction of the lead Offshore Patrol Cutter, along with long-lead materials for OPC #2. The total value of the options exercised is $317.5 million. Delayed by the impact of Hurricane Michael in October 2018, steel cutting for USCGC Argus began in January 2019.

In October 2019, the Department of Homeland Security approved a limited extraordinary relief for the offshore patrol cutter contract, as a result of damage to Eastern Shipbuilding facilities caused by Hurricane Michael and adjusted the offshore patrol cutter detail design and construction contract with Eastern Shipbuilding group for up to the first four hulls, providing $659M in additional funding. The Coast Guard will release a Request for Information to see industry interest in re-competing the remainder of the offshore patrol cutter Program of Record.

In July 2022, Austal USA was awarded the contract for detail design and material acquisition for the fifth hull in the class, with an option for up to 11 hulls in total (hulls 5–15).

In June 2023, the GAO raised their total lifecycle cost estimate for the acquisition of all 25 ships from $12.5B in 2012 ($10.5B program costs, $2.0B non-program costs) to $17.6B in 2022 ($12.5B program costs, $5.2B non-program costs). Major portions of the cost increases included hurricane relief for ESG ($659M), the design work and upfront costs of switching production to Austal ($1.7B), acquisition of new homeport facilities ($969M), government furnished equipment ($900M), and the Sensitive Compartmented Information Facility added during outfitting and post-delivery (almost $1B). (Dollar values are the cost increases from 2012.)

In August 2023, the Coast Guard estimated that the first Offshore Patrol Cutter, USCGC Argus (WMSM-915), wouldn't be delivered until on or about September 30, 2024, over three years later than its original projected delivery date of August 2021, and nearly six years after Eastern Shipbuilding first cut steel for the Argus in January 2019.

On October 7, 2023, first-in-class USCGC Argus was launched by Eastern Shipbuilding. As of September 2025, the Argus is still fitting out, and is not expected to be delivered until 2026.

On March 5, 2025, Congressman Mike Ezell, Chairman of the Coast Guard and Maritime Transportation subcommittee of the House Committee on Transportation and Infrastructure, reported that the Coast Guard now expects delivery of the first Offshore Patrol Cutter, USCGC Argus (WMSM-915), at the end of 2025, "four years late, and with a host of non-compliant parts."

On June 7, 2025, a temporary stop-work order was issued on the third and fourth hulls of the class, both at Eastern Shipbuilding. The order did not affect hulls planned at Austal USA. On July 11, 2025, the stop-work order was expanded to an outright cancellation of the third and fourth hulls. The Department of Homeland Security announcement of the cancellation remarked in passing that Argus was not expected to be delivered until the end of 2026 at the earliest.

== Ship list ==
Ship	Hull Number	Builder	Laid down	Launched	Commissioned	Homeport	Status
Argus	WMSM-915	Eastern Shipbuilding, Panama City, Florida	28 April 2020	27 October 2023		San Pedro, California	Under Construction
Chase	WMSM-916	Eastern Shipbuilding, Panama City, Florida	17 May 2021			San Pedro, California	Under Construction
Rush	WMSM-918	Eastern Shipbuilding, Panama City, Florida				Kodiak, Alaska	Cancelled
Pickering	WMSM-919	Austal USA, Mobile, Alabama	8 December 2025			Newport, Rhode Island	Under Construction
Icarus	WMSM-920	Austal USA, Mobile, Alabama				Newport, Rhode Island	Under construction
Ingham	WMSM-917	Austal USA, Mobile, Alabama				Kodiak, Alaska	Under Construction
Active	WMSM-921	Austal USA, Mobile, Alabama				Newport, Rhode Island	Planned
Diligence	WMSM-922	Austal USA, Mobile, Alabama				Newport, Rhode Island	Planned
Alert	WMSM-923	Austal USA, Mobile, Alabama					Planned
Vigilant	WMSM-924	Austal USA, Mobile, Alabama					Planned
Reliance	WMSM-925	Austal USA, Mobile, Alabama					Planned

== See also ==
- List of equipment of the United States Coast Guard
- Medium endurance cutter
