= USS LST-20 =

1943 LST-1-class tank landing ship

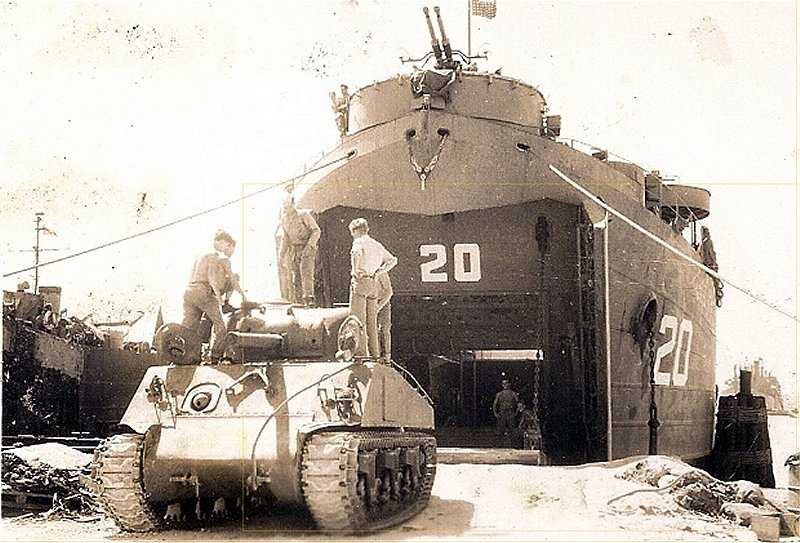
- USS LST-20 beached at Guam, Marianas Islands in 1945, while loading/unloading an M4 medium tank.

History

United States
- Name: LST-20
- Builder: Dravo Corporation, Pittsburgh, Pennsylvania
- Laid down: 5 October 1942
- Launched: 15 February 1943
- Sponsored by: Miss Anne B. Sylvester
- Commissioned: 14 April 1943
- Decommissioned: 3 April 1946
- Stricken: 19 June 1946
- Identification: Hull symbol: LST-20; Code letters: NQBG
- Honors and awards: 4 × battle stars
- Fate: transferred to the Maritime Administration (MARCOM), 8 October 1947; Sold, 8 October 1947; Resold, 21 December 1948

Panama
- Owner: Pan Ore Steamship Company
- Acquired: 21 December 1948
- Status: Fate unknown

General characteristics
- Type: LST-1-class tank landing ship
- Displacement: 4,080 long tons (4,145 t) full load; 2,160 long tons (2,190 t) landing
- Length: 328 ft (100 m) oa
- Beam: 50 ft (15 m)
- Draft: Full load: 8 ft 2 in (2.49 m) forward; 14 ft 1 in (4.29 m) aft; Landing at 2,160 t: 3 ft 11 in (1.19 m) forward; 9 ft 10 in (3.00 m) aft
- Installed power: 2 × 900 hp (670 kW) Electro-Motive Diesel 12-567A diesel engines; 1,700 shp (1,300 kW)
- Propulsion: 1 × Falk main reduction gears; 2 × Propellers
- Speed: 12 kn (22 km/h; 14 mph)
- Range: 24,000 nmi (44,000 km; 28,000 mi) at 9 kn (17 km/h; 10 mph) while displacing 3,960 long tons (4,024 t)
- Boats & landing craft carried: 2 or 6 x LCVPs
- Capacity: 2,100 tons oceangoing maximum; 350 tons main deckload
- Troops: 16 officers, 147 enlisted men
- Complement: 13 officers, 104 enlisted men
- Armament: Varied, ultimate armament; 2 × twin 40 mm (1.57 in) Bofors guns; 4 × single 40 mm Bofors guns; 12 × 20 mm (0.79 in) Oerlikon cannons

Service record
- Part of: LST Flotilla 14
- Operations: Gilbert Islands operation (November–December 1943); Leyte landings (October 1944); Battle of Luzon Lingayen Gulf landings (January 1945); Palawan Island landings (1–2 March 1945); Okinawa Gunto operation (April 1945)
- Awards: American Campaign Medal; Asiatic–Pacific Campaign Medal; World War II Victory Medal; Navy Occupation Service Medal w/Asia Clasp; Philippine Liberation Medal

USS LST-20 was a United States Navy LST-1-class tank landing ship used exclusively in the Asiatic-Pacific Theater during World War II and manned by a United States Coast Guard crew. Like many of her class, she was not named and is properly referred to by her hull designation.

== Construction ==
LST-20 was laid down on 5 October 1942, at Pittsburgh, Pennsylvania, by the Dravo Corporation; launched on 15 February 1943; sponsored by Miss Anne B. Sylvester. She was floated down the Ohio and Mississippi rivers and entered commissioned service on 14 May 1943.

== Service history ==
During the war, LST-20 served exclusively in the Asiatic-Pacific Theater from November 1943 until November 1945.

On 27 July 1943, LST-20 departed with six other LSTs escorted by Oracle, Charleston, and Hutchins for Adak Island in the Aleutians.

LST-20 participated in operations in the Gilbert Islands during November and December 1943.

In October 1944, LST-20 moved to the Philippines to participate in General Douglas MacArthur's promised liberation of the islands from the Japanese occupation. LST-20 participated at the Leyte landings and the Battle of Luzon Lingayen Gulf landings in January 1945.

LST-20 finished her combat career with the assault and occupation of Okinawa Gunto in April 1945.

== Postwar career ==
Following the war, LST-20 performed occupation duty in the Far East until early November 1945. She returned to San Diego on 23 December 1945. She departed San Diego on 11 January 1946, for Galveston, Texas, via the Canal Zone, arriving there on 1 February 1946, and was decommissioned on 3 April 1946. She was struck from the Navy list on 19 June 1946, and was transferred to the Maritime Administration (MARCOM) on 8 October 1947.

== Merchant service ==
On 8 October 1947, MARCOM sold LST-20 to Southern Shipwrecking Company that in turn resold her to Pan Ore Steamship Company who reflagged her for Panama, her final disposition is unknown.

== Honors and awards ==
LST-20 earned four battle stars for her World War II service.

== Bibliography ==
- "LST-20". Dictionary of American Naval Fighting Ships. Naval History and Heritage Command. This article incorporates text from this source, which is in the public domain.
- "USS LST-20". NavSource. 7 May 2010.
- "USS LST-20" (PDF). United States Coast Guard. This article incorporates text from this source, which is in the public domain.
