= Gary Blore =

American Coast Guard admiral

Gary Thomas Blore
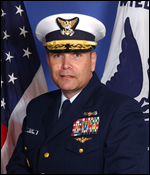
- Branch: United States Coast Guard
- Service years: 1975–2011
- Rank: Rear Admiral
- Commands: Thirteenth Coast Guard District; Integrated Deepwater System Program (PEO)
- Conflicts: Operation Desert Shield/Desert Storm; Mariel boatlift
- Awards: Coast Guard Distinguished Service Medal; Legion of Merit; Meritorious Service Medal
- Education: United States Coast Guard Academy; Columbia University
- Other work: Director of Defense Threat Reduction Agency (DTRA)

Flag of a Rear Admiral of the United States Coast Guard

Gary Thomas Blore is a retired Rear Admiral of the United States Coast Guard. He retired as the Commander of the Thirteenth Coast Guard District in 2011. As of February 2017, he was serving as Director of Operations, Readiness and Exercises for the Defense Threat Reduction Agency.

Blore attended the Coast Guard Academy, and graduated in 1975. From 1977 until 1982, he served as a helicopter aircraft commander at Coast Guard Air Station Brooklyn, NY, and participated in the Mariel (Cuba) to Key West Cuban Exodus of 1980. He then attended the School of International and Public Affairs at Columbia University, earning a Master of Public Administration degree in 1984.

From 1998 to 2002, Blore served as a Guardian fanjet aircraft commander at Coast Guard Air Station Cape Cod, where he was deployed for four months to Operation Desert Shield/Desert Storm, in early 1991. From 2002 to 2004, Blore served as the Coast Guard's Chief, Office of Budget and Programs for the Assistant Commandant for Planning, Resources and Procurement with oversight of a $7 billion budget.

From April 17, 2006, to June 7, 2007, he served as Program Executive Officer (PEO) of the Integrated Deepwater System Program. Then from 2007 to 2009, he served as the Coast Guard's Assistant Commandant for Acquisition, or Chief Acquisition Officer.

On July 14, 2009, Admiral Blore assumed Command of the Thirteenth Coast Guard District in Seattle, Washington.

His personal decorations include the Coast Guard Distinguished Service Medal, five awards of the Legion of Merit, two Meritorious Service Medals, two Coast Guard Commendation Medals and the Transportation 9-11 Medal.

Rear Admiral Blore is married to the former Vera Steiner of New York City, NY. They have two children: David and Anna.

He was formerly married to Ann Pasaric-Blore, his two children from that marriage were Marie Teresa Blore and Thomas Daniel Blore.
