= Integrated Deepwater System Program =

U.S. Coast Guard modernization program

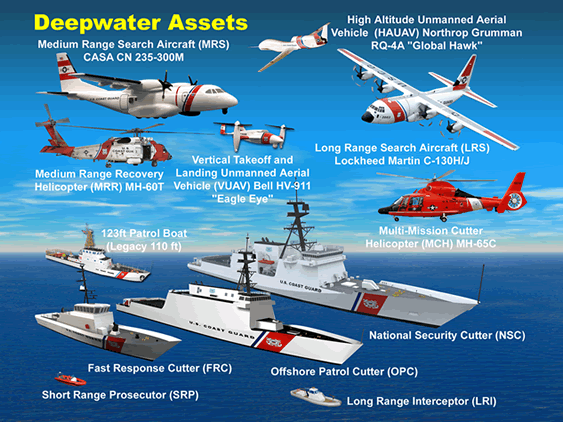
Illustrated Integrated Deepwater System (IDS) Program.

The Integrated Deepwater System Program (IDS Program or Deepwater) was the 25-year program to replace all or much of the United States Coast Guard's equipment, including aircraft, ships, and logistics and command and control systems. The $24 billion program, which began with a price tag of $17 billion, lost authorization in Fiscal Year 2012 and is officially defunct.

The initial idea was to develop interoperable system which included new cutters and small boats, a new fleet of fixed-wing aircraft, a combination of new and upgraded helicopters, and land- and cutter-based unmanned aerial vehicles (UAVs). All of these assets were to be linked with Command, Control, Communications and Computers, Intelligence, Surveillance and Reconnaissance (C4ISR) systems. Performance-based logistics is also an aspect of the contract.

== History ==
The Integrated Deepwater System Program's logo

The Coast Guard performs many missions in a deepwater environment, which is usually defined as waters more than 50 nautical miles offshore. These missions include drug interdiction, alien migrant interdiction, fisheries enforcement, search and rescue, International Ice Patrol operations, maritime sanctions enforcement, overseas port security and defense, overseas peacetime military engagement, defense operations in conjunction with the U.S. Navy, maritime pollution law enforcement, enforcement of lightering zones, and overseas inspection of foreign vessels entering U.S. ports. During the 1990s, it was determined that the assets and capabilities needed to complete deepwater missions were antiquated and becoming obsolete and included 93 cutters and 207 aircraft. The assets were technologically obsolete and often expensive to operate as well as unsuited for evolving mission requirements.

In 1993, the Commandant's Office of Operations formally acknowledged that the Coast Guard needed a long-term strategy to recapitalize its inventory of cutters and aircraft, and supporting systems. In 1998 the Coast Guard issued a Request for Proposal (RFP) for industry teams to bid in proposal a package of assets and systems to meet an identified set of Coast Guard mission requirements.

This unique "performance-based approach" to modernization and replacement of the Coast Guard deepwater fleet was competitively bid on by three teams: One led by Science Applications International Corporation (SAIC), one led by Boeing, and one led by Integrated Coast Guard Systems LLC, a joint venture of Lockheed Martin and Northrop Grumman established in June 2001 and jointly owned and fully guaranteed by both companies. In June 2002, the Coast Guard awarded the base-term agreement of the then 20-year, $17 billion Deepwater contract to Integrated Coast Guard Systems (ICGS).

During the first three years of the initial five-year contract, the Coast Guard re-evaluated the Deepwater program in July 2005, expanding requirements due to post-9/11 mission needs, which expanded the program to 25 years and a total of $24 billion.

Acquisition Directorate (CG-9) seal

In July 2007, Deepwater became part of the newly created Acquisition Directorate (CG-9).

The Program Executive Officer (PEO) for Deepwater from June 2007 was RADM Ronald J. Rábago. His predecessors included RADM Gary Blore and the "founding father of the IDS", RADM Patrick M. Stillman.

Integrated Coast Guard Systems has participated in joint Integrated Product Teams (IPTs) with the Coast Guard since the inception of the Deepwater program. Oversight of contractor performance by the government is largely non-existent, due to contract language developed by the contractor. A major performance metric was IPT meeting attendance.

ICGS subcontracts with more than 600 suppliers in 41 states, as well as manufacturers from around the world.

== Assets ==
=== National Security Cutter ===
One of the key components of the Deepwater solution is the National Security Cutter (NSC). These eight Legend-class cutters were designed to replace the aging 378-foot (115 m) Hamilton-class cutters. The NSC have a length of 418 feet (125.2 m), are powered by a gas turbine engine with two auxiliary diesel engines, and are capable of 12,000 nautical mile (22,000 km) voyages lasting up to 60 days.

The new class of NSCs carry an MK 110 57 mm gun and are equipped with a stern launch ramp for launch and recovery of the Short Range Prosecutor (SRP) and the Long Range Interceptor (LRI). They are equipped with a state-of-the-art C4ISR suite. A contract for the third cutter was issued in August 2007, and included structural improvements based on flaws discovered during the construction of the first two cutters.

USCGC Bertholf (WMSL-750) – The first-in-class NSC is named for Commodore Ellsworth Price Bertholf, USRCS, USCG, the fourth Commandant of the United States Coast Guard. The cutter was built by Northrop Grumman Ship Systems in Pascagoula, Mississippi under contract from ICGS and was completed in early 2008.

Meryl Chertoff, wife of U.S. Department of Homeland Security Secretary Michael Chertoff, was chosen by the Coast Guard as sponsor of the first NSC. The keel laying for Bertholf took place in March 2005. The cutter was launched in September 2006. She was christened in November 2006.

The Coast Guard accepted delivery of the Bertholf in May 2008. She was commissioned on Coast Guard Day, in August 2008 at her homeport in Alameda, California.

USCGC Waesche (WMSL-751) – The second Legend-class NSC is named for Commandant Russell R. Waesche who served as Commandant of the Coast Guard and was the first Coast Guard Admiral to receive four stars. The cutter was built at Northrop Grumman Ship Systems in Pascagoula, Mississippi.

Marilla Waesche Pivonka, granddaughter of the cutter's namesake, was chosen by the Coast Guard as sponsor of the second NSC. The keel laying for the Waesche took place in September 2006, and she was christened in July 2008. USCGC Waesche was commissioned in May 2010.

USCGC Stratton (WMSL-752) - The third NSC is named for Captain Dorothy C. Stratton who was the director of the SPARS, the Coast Guard's Women's Reserve established during World War II. The cutter began construction in July 2008, in Pascagoula, Miss. First Lady Michelle Obama was chosen as sponsor of the third NSC.

=== Fast Response Cutter ===
The Fast Response Cutter (FRC) was intended to replace the 110’ Island Class Cutters currently in service. It was removed from the IDS contract due to concerns over the feasibility of the ship design. The role will now be served by the Sentinel class cutter, which is based on an off-the-shelf design that has already proven itself.

=== Offshore Patrol Cutter ===
The Offshore Patrol Cutter is intended to replace the 210' and 270' cutters currently in service. It was also removed from the IDS contract, but developed and delivery continued. In February 2014, the USCG announced that Bollinger Shipyards, Eastern Shipbuilding and General Dynamics Bath Iron Works had been awarded design contracts for the OPC.

=== 123' Patrol Boat ===
The 123' patrol boats were intended to serve as a bridging strategy until replacements for the 110' Island Class cutters could be designed and procured. They were created by lengthening eight existing 110' cutters to accommodate additional mission capabilities. The converted 123's were deemed unsafe for use in the projected operating environment in 2007 and are currently awaiting disposition. The USCG asked the contractors in August 2007 for a refund because these former 110 foot cutters will now have to be scrapped resulting in a reduction of capability instead of improvement.

In August 2011, the U.S. government sued contractor Bollinger Shipyards over the failed modifications, alleging that the company made false statements about the hull strength that would result from its extensions to the patrol boats. That lawsuit was settled in 2015 with Bollinger paying $7.5 million to the U.S. government, as opposed to a proposed $73 million penalty and a $96 million partial refund.

=== Medium Range Surveillance Aircraft ===
The Medium Range Surveillance Maritime Patrol Aircraft (MRS) HC-144 Ocean Sentry is a new twin-turbo-prop airplane selected by the Coast Guard to replace the HU-25 Falcon Guardian, which has been in service since 1982.

Also known as the CN-235, the MRS aircraft are built by EADS CASA in Seville, Spain and are being transported upon completion to Mobile, Ala. for C4ISR pallet installation by Lockheed Martin. The first MRS aircraft was delivered to the Coast Guard in December 2006. Currently there are three aircraft undergoing testing in Mobile and an additional five are in various stages of construction.

The MRS aircraft, or "Ocean Sentry", will be the eyes of the Coast Guard fleet. It features a belly-mounted radar and is equipped with improved detection capability. It will be used in search and rescue missions, international patrol missions, law enforcement, and for illegal drug interdictions.

=== Multi-Mission Cutter Helicopter ===
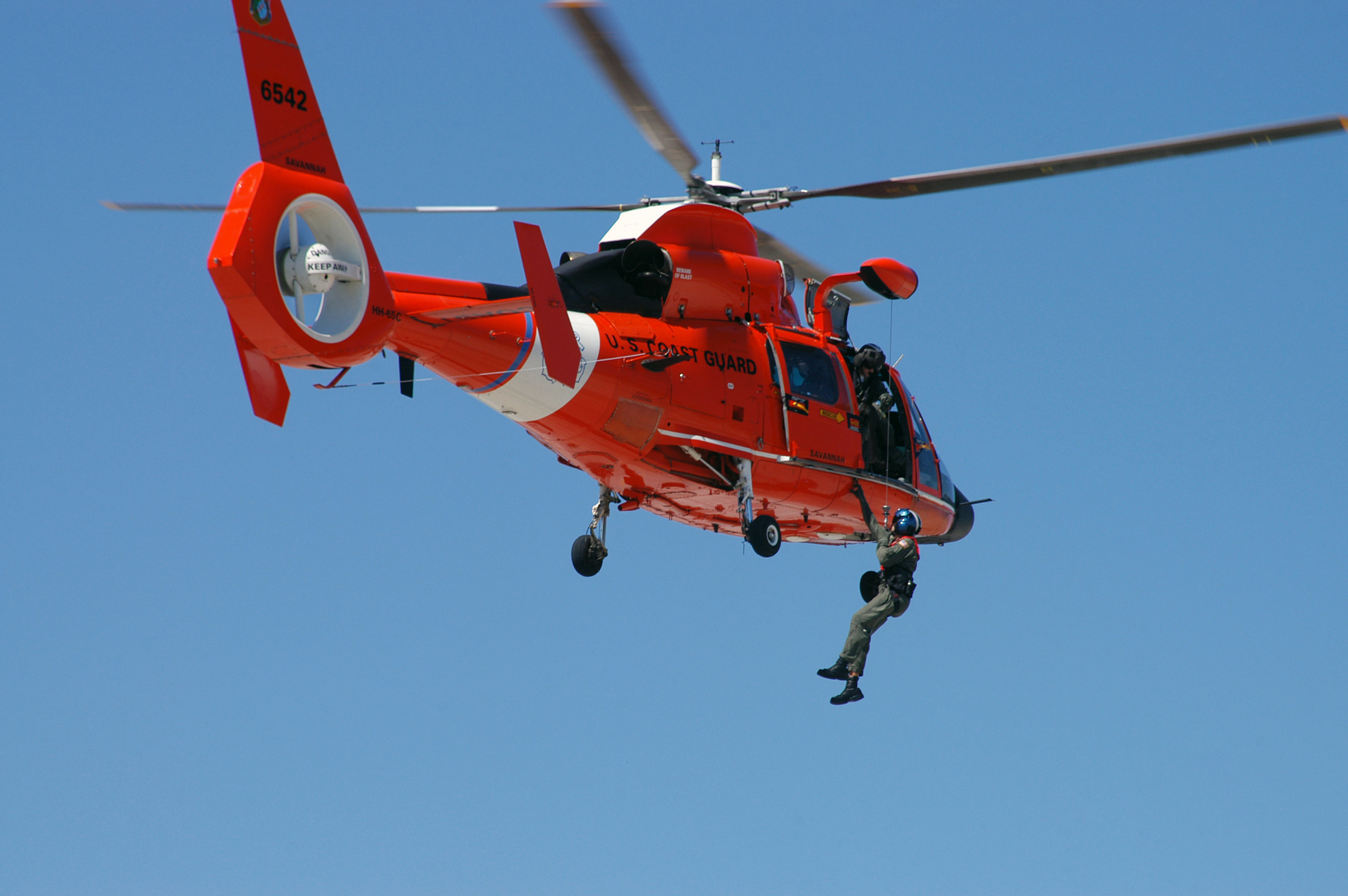
A HH-65C Dolphin helicopter in 2006

The Multi-Mission Cutter Helicopter (MCH) MH-65C is the upgraded model of the HH-65 Dolphin helicopter, which has been used by the Coast Guard since the 1980s. The new model (HH-65C model) features a more powerful engine, allowing the helicopter to fly faster, twice as far, and with twice the payload as their predecessor, the HH-65B model.

The reengining, which began in 2004, was originally scheduled to take place during the conversion to a multi-mission cutter helicopter, equipped with airborne use of force, but was accelerated under the Deepwater program following multiple in-flight loss of power events.

The upgrade program was completed in Fall 2007.

=== Small Unmanned Aircraft Systems ===
The United States Coast Guard is currently in the acquisition phase of their sUAS (small unmanned aircraft system) program. The Boeing Insitu ScanEagle has been selected by the Coast Guard to fulfill the cutter based sUAS role. Currently they are in the process of initial operating testing of sUAS capability on National Security Cutters. A request is expected to be released by the Coast Guard in early fiscal year 2018 for sUAS capability for NSCs with a contract award for the retrofit of sUAS capability on the USCGC Stratton and one other NSC later in the fiscal year.

The USCGC Stratton had sUAS deployed on it throughout 2017 assisting with drug interdiction missions. In total the sUAS was used in 9 out of 11 drug seizures which seized over 50,550 pounds of cocaine worth approximately $679.3 million.

The Coast Guard expects to have sUAS capability across all of the National Security Cutter fleet along with the Offshore Patrol Cutter fleet. The cutter-based sUAS systems are excepted to be operated by AVDETs (aviation detachments) of three officers and four enlisted personnel once fully operational. Officers will serve as pilots, however it is unclear as to whether or not they will be trained as manned aircraft aviators or if a new officer qualification will be created for officers or if it will become a maritime-rating for cuttermen. Enlisted personnel are to serve in launch and recovery roles as provide needed maintenance to the sUAS.

=== Performance Based Logistics ===
All logistics support were intended to be provided through ICGS. With the exception of one year of support for C4 systems, this has been cancelled.

== Controversy ==
=== RAND Report ===
In 2004, the RAND Corporation released a report that questioned the ability of the Deepwater program to handle both the traditional duties of the USCG and the additional missions it has undertaken under DHS and recommended doubling the number of cutters and increasing airpower by 50%.

=== Funding and management issues ===
Because of the scale of the building program exceeded anything done by the USCG before, Deepwater is unique in that the primary contractors were tasked with making design and procurement decisions on behalf of the Federal government. This did not achieve its intended result - assets that were designed to meet mission needs.

Because of performance problems, Deepwater has been the source of congressional budget battles over its funding. For fiscal year 2006, President George W. Bush requested funding of over $900 million, but the House of Representatives approved only $500 million. In September 2005, the full Congress did approve $900 million, just short of the President's original request.

In August 2006, the inspector general in the Homeland Security Department said that the department's oversight of the program was hampered by funding limitations and lack of experience with this type of program.

As of late 2006, the cost of the program had risen to $24 billion, from the original estimate of $17 billion in 2002. In 2007, the Coast Guard took over management of the program.

=== Lockheed whistleblower ===
Michael DeKort, a former lead systems engineer at Lockheed Martin for Deepwater, was dissatisfied and concerned with Lockheed Martin's conduct, in particular that of Lockheed executive Fred Moosally. After a series of failed attempts to draw needed attention to a growing problem within the project, DeKort made news headlines for taking a bold approach into corporate whistleblowing by utilizing YouTube. After over a year of investigations, some conducted by congress, the Department of Homeland Security Inspector General's office and various members of the press, it appears DeKort's allegations have all been proven to be accurate.

In 2008, news stories surfaced demonstrating his warning, that significant C4ISR problems will continue on all future ship assets, like the National Security Cutters, appears to be true. A Department of Justice investigation which began in the fall of 2007 is ongoing. In May 2008 the Coast Guard was asked to put aside its $96 million refund request from ICGS so the DoJ and DHS IG could pursue the case themselves. In the summer of 2008 several reports on the Deepwater program—specifically the state of the 123 refund and the NSCs were submitted to congress by the GAO.

Relative to the 123s the GAO compiled a list of costs the Coast Guard has incurred as a result of the eight lost patrol boats. These costs add up to well beyond the $96 million refund the Coast Guard requested. Their figures approached $150 million and did not include the residual value of the eight 123s or the $1.3 million for the eight rejected SRPs (Short Range Prosecutors). In another report the GAO acknowledged that the DoJ investigation now included an investigation into the NSC problems as well as the problems associated with 123s.

In May 2009, the DHS IG released a report on the claims and amounts recovered. DeKort responded to this report with a list of additional issues the IG neglected and suggested that the same issues may occur with the NSC.

== References cited ==
- O’Rourke, Ronald. "Coast Guard Deepwater Program: Background, Oversight Issues, and Options for Congress; updated April 30, 2007" (PDF). CRS Report for Congress. US Government Printing Office.
- Renae Merle and Spencer S. Hsu, "Costly Fleet Update Falters: Contractors Oversee Coast Guard Project, Washington Post, December 8, 2006
- Eric Lipton, "Billions Later, Plan to Remake the Coast Guard Fleet Stumbles", New York Times, December 9, 2006
- "In Deepwater", The Economist, April 19, 2007
- "Acquisition Directorate". Coast Guard Acquisition Directorate (CG-9). US Coast Guard.
