= Eastern Shipbuilding =

Shipbuilder based in Panama City, Florida, U.S.

Eastern Shipbuilding Group is a shipbuilder based in Panama City, Florida that operates facilities in the Florida Panhandle in Panama City, Allanton (suburb of Panama City, Fl.), and Port St. Joe.

The company was founded in 1976 as Eastern Marine by Brian R. D'Isernia as a builder of fishing vessels, and began diversifying into constructing custom ships in the 1980s, beginning with the delivery of its first platform supply vessel (PSV) for the offshore oil and gas industry in 1981. In 1988, the company shut down, but was re-founded at the Panama City shipyard in 1997 as Eastern Shipbuilding Group, and purchased the former-Halter Marine shipyard facility in Allanton in 2000. As of 2009, Eastern employed about 900 people at its two shipyards, covering about 151 acres. Eastern primarily built tugboats and oil industry support vessels through the 2000s and into the 2010s, delivering 93 tugboats and 33 PSVs and similar vessels between 2006 and 2016. In 2012, it began leasing a site in Port St. Joe for post-launch outfitting. By 2016, the company had annual sales of about $300 million, with 1,700 employees and facilities that covered 326 acres. While its primary market remains offshore supply vessels, Eastern received two major orders for other ship types in the mid 2010s—the United States Coast Guard's Offshore Patrol Cutter in 2016, and the Staten Island Ferry's Ollis-class ferry 2017.

Eastern Shipbuilding manufactures tugboats, specialty vessels, fireboats, offshore supply vessels, ferries, fishing vessels, and cutter-patrol craft. They were selected in 2025 to build three hybrid electric ferries for the Washington State Ferries system that will each carry 160 vehicles and 1,500 passengers.

In 2026, Senator Rick Scott held up Coast Guard promotions over Eastern Shipbuilding's 2016 contract to build Heritage-class cutters, which were supposed to be delivered starting in 2023. Homeland Security secretary Kristi Noem cut the order from four cutters to two in 2025, stating it was "harming the U.S.'s defense capabilities and wasting American’s hard-earned money". Eastern Shipbuilding then stopped work on the remaining ships.
