= Shelikhov =

Shelikhov or Shelikof may refer to:

- Denys Shelikhov (born 1989), Ukrainian footballer
- Grigory Shelikhov (1747-1795), also spelled "Shelekhov" and "Shelikof", a Russian fur trader
- Natalia Shelikhova, wife of Grigory Shelikhov
- Shelikhov Gulf, sometimes called "Shelikhov Bay" or "Shelikhova Bay", a gulf off the northwestern coast of Kamchatka, Russia
- Shelikof Strait in Alaska in the United States
- USS Shelikof (AVP-52), a United States Navy seaplane tender
