= USS Rehoboth (AVP-50) =

Oceanographic survey ship from 1948 to 1970

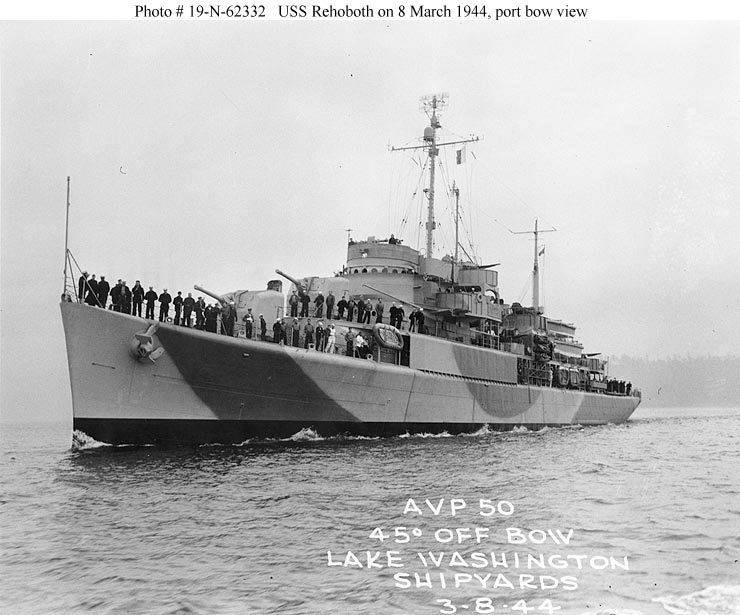
- USS Rehoboth (AVP-50) off Houghton, Washington, on 8 March 1944, two weeks after commissioning

History

United States
- Name: USS Rehoboth
- Namesake: Rehoboth Bay in Delaware
- Builder: Lake Washington Shipyard, Houghton, Washington
- Laid down: 3 August 1942
- Launched: 8 November 1942
- Sponsored by: Mrs. R. P. McConnell
- Commissioned: 23 February 1944
- Decommissioned: 30 June 1947
- Recommissioned: 2 September 1948
- Reclassified: Oceanographic survey ship in 1948; AGS-50 in August 1949
- Decommissioned: 15 April 1970
- Stricken: 15 April 1970
- Fate: Sold for scrapping September 1970

General characteristics
- Class & type: Barnegat-class seaplane tender 1944-1947; Oceanographic survey ship 1948-1970
- Displacement: 1,766 tons (2,592 tons trial)
- Length: 310 ft 9 in (94.72 m)
- Beam: 41 ft 2 in (12.55 m)
- Draft: 13 ft 6 in (4.11 m) (lim.)
- Installed power: 6,000 horsepower (4.48 megawatts)
- Propulsion: Diesel engines, two shafts
- Speed: 18.2 knots (33.7 km/h)
- Complement: As seaplane tender: 215 (ship's company); 367 (including aviation unit)
- Sensors & processing systems: Radar; sonar
- Armament: 3 × 5 in (130 mm) guns (reduced to one gun by early 1945); 8 × 40 mm guns; 8 × 20 mm guns; 2 × depth charge tracks; Disarmed by 1959
- Aviation facilities: As seaplane tender: supplies, spare parts, repairs, and berthing for one seaplane squadron; 80,000 US gallons (300,000 L) aviation fuel

The second USS Rehoboth (AVP-50/AGS-50) was in commission in the United States Navy as a seaplane tender from 1944 to 1947 and as an oceanographic survey ship from 1948 to 1970.

== Construction, commissioning, and shakedown ==
Rehoboth was laid down on 3 August 1942 at Houghton, Washington, by the Lake Washington Shipyard. She was launched on 8 November 1942, sponsored by Mrs. R. P. McConnell, and commissioned on 23 February 1944.

== World War II service ==
Rehoboth was originally operated as a Barnegat-class seaplane tender. Following shakedown off San Diego, California, Rehoboth transited the Panama Canal on 25 April 1944 and reached Norfolk, Virginia, on 14 May 1944. On 17 May 1944 she sailed for Casablanca carrying men and cargo of Blimp Squadron 14. Returning to Norfolk on 9 June 1944, she carried cargo and personnel for Fleet Air Wing 7 in the United Kingdom from 8 July 1944 to 9 August 1944, then sailed south to Recife, Brazil, reporting to Commander, Fleet Air Wing 16, for duty on 31 August 1944. She transported passengers and cargo between various Brazilian ports until 15 January 1945, when she departed Natal, Brazil, for Bristol, England, carrying personnel and cargo for Commander, Fleet Air Wing 7. On 14 February 1945 she returned to Norfolk, whence, until mid-June 1945, she carried men and equipment to Bristol and Avonmouth in England.

== Peacetime service 1945-1947 ==
Rehoboth retransited the Panama Canal on 18 August 1945, and after calls at San Diego and Pearl Harbor, Hawaii, she arrived off Okinawa on 2 October 1945. There for two weeks she tended planes of Air-Sea Rescue Squadron 6 (VH-6), then steamed to Jinsen (now Incheon), Korea, where she took command of a seadrome and tended planes of Patrol Bombing Squadron 20 (VPB-20). In mid-November 1945 she crossed the Yellow Sea, and from 18 November 1945 to 21 December 1945 she tended a detachment of VH-6. On 25 December 1945 she arrived at Shanghai, China, to tend Air-Sea Rescue Squadron 1 (VH-1) and Patrol Bombing Squadron 25 (VPB-25) seaplanes. On 25 January 1946, Rehoboth got underway for Nagoya, Japan, thence proceeded to Kobe, Japan, on 17 February 1946, where she set up an auxiliary seadrome area. On 24 March 1946 she arrived at Sasebo, Japan, where she assumed seadrome control.

Rehoboth continued to serve in Japanese waters until August 1946 when she returned briefly to the Chinese coast, then operated off Australia and in the Philippines. In November 1946 she returned to Japan, whence she sailed east in 1947. Arriving at San Diego on 18 March 1947, she continued on, transited the Panama Canal at the end of March 1947, and reached Philadelphia, Pennsylvania, on 9 April 1947. She was decommissioned on 30 June 1947.

== Oceanographic survey operations 1948-1970 ==
Rehoboth commenced conversion to an oceanographic survey ship in 1948. She recommissioned on 2 September 1948, and commenced oceanographic survey work under the direction of the Navy Hydrographic Office, predecessor of the Naval Oceanographic Office, being redesignated AGS-50 in August 1949. Equipped with a small laboratory and machinery to take Nansen casts, which provide the oceanographer with the temperature and samples of sea water at different depths, and to drill for core samples, she traveled over 300,000 nautical miles (560,000 km) in the North Atlantic and adjacent seas during her first six years of operation.

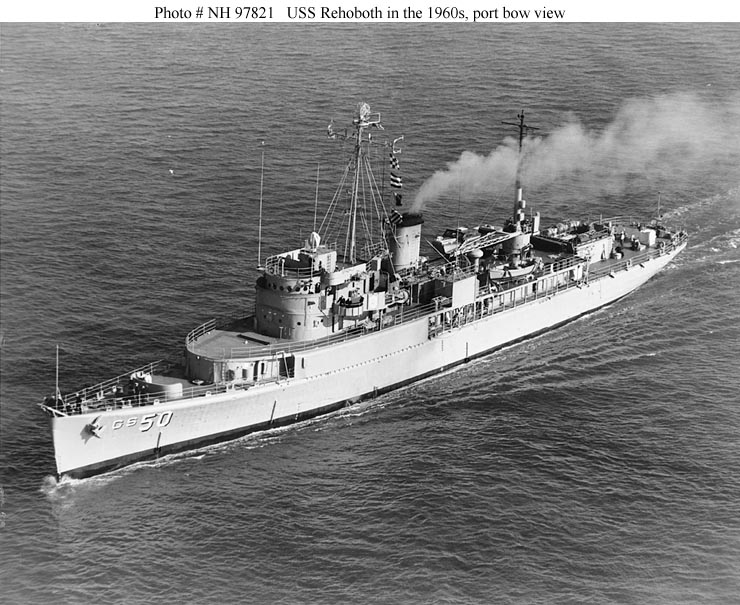
Rehoboth (AGS-50) as an oceanographic survey ship in the 1960s

In February 1952, while crossing the Atlantic, Rehoboth discovered and accurately positioned an underwater mountain range with heights up to 12,000 feet (3,700 m) above the ocean floor. In March 1952 she discovered and charted a 7,000-foot (2,100 m) undersea mountain near Bermuda and in August 1953 she became the first ship to anchor in over 2 1/2 miles (4,000 m) of water.

Employed on special projects in 1953 and 1954, she returned to oceanographic survey work in the Atlantic and Caribbean in 1955.

Transferred to the Pacific in 1956, Rehoboth departed Philadelphia on 15 February 1956. Transiting the Panama Canal on 22 February 1956, she was diverted to an area northwest of the Galapagos Islands to search for the raft Cantuta, which she found after four days. On 9 March 1956 Rehoboth reached San Francisco, California, and for the next year operated off the United States West Coast. On 4 March 1957 she proceeded to Pearl Harbor for three months of work in Hawaiian waters. For the next nine months she operated in the eastern Pacific. In April 1958 she extended her range to the Marshall Islands and in 1960 to the Western Pacific. In October 1960 she also added operations off the coast of South America. For the next four years her missions spanned the Pacific from equatorial to arctic climes.

In August 1963, Rehoboth sailed from Adak, Alaska for a three-month oceanographic survey of the North Pacific off both coasts of the Kamchatka peninsula. This included a rare visit by a U.S. Navy vessel to the Sea of Okhotsk. On August 21, 1963, while undertaking deep-sea oceanographic operations (and therefore unable to get underway), Rehoboth inadvertently drifted into (or was overtaken by) a Soviet naval exercise. A Soviet warship (following naval protocol) informed Rehoboth that she had drifted into a dangerous area and requested that she depart the area. As soon as the oceanographic equipment had been recovered and was on deck, Rehoboth complied.

In November 1963, after a port call in Yokosuka Japan, Rehoboth paid a three-day good-will visit to the city of Nakhodka in the Soviet Union. It was reportedly the first U.S.-flagged vessel ever to visit that city.

In September 1965, Rehoboth completed operations in the northern Pacific and in November 1965 commenced survey operations in the South China Sea, conducting in December 1965 a hydrographic survey of the coast of South Vietnam from the Mekong Delta to Cape Padaran.

After completing survey operations in the South China Sea in February 1966, Rehoboth sailed east, arriving at San Francisco on 23 March 1966. Overhaul and United States West Coast operations followed. In 1967 she conducted operations in the northern and western Pacific. In California waters from December 1967 until 14 March 1968, she then departed San Francisco for Yokosuka, Japan. She undertook survey operations in the Philippine Sea until August 1968, returning to San Francisco on 26 September 1968, where she remained for the balance of the year. She operated off the California coast in early 1969 until deploying to the Far East in August 1969, returning in December 1969 to San Francisco.

== Final decommissioning and disposal ==
Rehoboth again was decommissioned and was struck from the Navy List on 15 April 1970. She was sold for scrapping in September 1970.

== Awards ==
During her career, Rehoboth earned the following awards:

=== U.S. awards ===
- China Service Medal
- American Campaign Medal
- European–African–Middle Eastern Campaign Medal
- Asiatic-Pacific Campaign Medal
- World War II Victory Medal
- Navy Occupation Medal with "ASIA/EUROPE" clasp
- National Defense Service Medal
- Vietnam Service Medal with two campaign stars

=== Foreign award ===
- Vietnam Campaign Medal with 60– Device (Republic of Vietnam)
