= USS Gardiners Bay =

Tender of the United States Navy

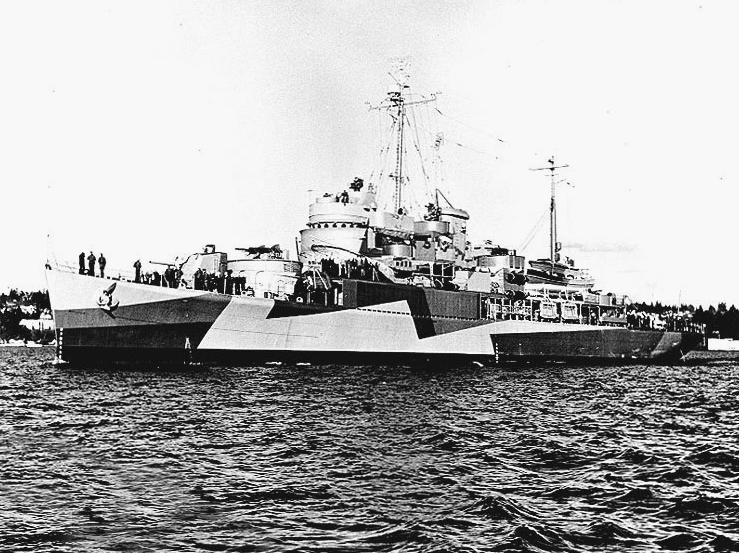
- USS Gardiners Bay (AVP-39) off Houghton, Washington, on 18 February 1945, a week after commissioning.

History

United States
- Name: USS Gardiners Bay (AVP-39)
- Namesake: Gardiners Bay, on Block Island Sound, Long Island, New York
- Builder: Lake Washington Shipyard, Houghton, Washington
- Laid down: 14 March 1944
- Launched: 2 December 1944
- Sponsored by: Mrs. George L. Richard
- Commissioned: 11 February 1945
- Decommissioned: 1 February 1958
- Honors and awards: Two battle stars for World War II service; Four battle stars for Korean War service
- Fate: Transferred to Norway 17 May 1958

Norway
- Name: HNoMS Haakon VII (A537)
- Namesake: King Haakon VII of Norway
- Acquired: 17 May 1958
- Stricken: 1974
- Fate: Discarded 1974

General characteristics (seaplane tender)
- Class & type: Barnegat-class seaplane tender
- Displacement: 1,766 tons (2,592 tons trial)
- Length: 310 ft 9 in (94.72 m)
- Beam: 41 ft 2 in (12.55 m)
- Draft: 13 ft 6 in (4.11 m) (lim.)
- Installed power: 6,000 horsepower (4.48 megawatts)
- Propulsion: Diesel engines, two shafts
- Speed: 18.2 knots (33.7 km/h)s
- Complement: 215 (ship's company); 367 (with aviation unit)
- Sensors & processing systems: Radar; sonar
- Armament: 3 × 5 in (130 mm) guns (Note: According to Lieutenant junior grade William E. LaLonde, who was aboard Gardiners Bay with duties that included assistant gunnery officer from 14 March 1944 until he left her in Shanghai, China, after the conclusion of World War II, Gardiners Bay had one 5-inch (127-mm) gun, not three.); 8 × 40 mm guns; 8 × 20 mm guns; 2 × depth charge tracks
- Aviation facilities: Supplies, spare parts, repairs, and berthing for one seaplane squadron; 80,000 US gallons (300,000 L)

General characteristics (training ship)
- Type: Training ship
- Displacement: 1,766 tons (standard); 2,800 tons (full load)
- Length: 310 ft 9 in (94.72 m) overall; 300 ft 0 in (91.44 m) waterline
- Beam: 41 ft 2 in (12.55 m)
- Draft: 13 ft 6 in (4.11 m) (maximum)
- Installed power: 6,080 brake horsepower (4.54 megawatts)
- Propulsion: Two Fairbanks-Morse diesel engines, two shafts
- Speed: 18.2 knots (33.7 km/h)
- Complement: 215 ship's company plus 86 officer cadets and petty officer apprentices; 367 total accommodation
- Sensors & processing systems: Radar
- Armament: 1 × 127 mm (5-inch) 38-caliber gun mount; 10 × 40 mm antiaircraft guns; 2 × 20 mm antiaircraft guns

USS Gardiners Bay (AVP-39) was a United States Navy seaplane tender in commission from 1945 to 1958 that saw service in the latter stages of World War II and in the Korean War. After her decommissioning, she was transferred to Norway, and she served in the Royal Norwegian Navy as the training ship HNoMS Haakon VII (A537) from 1958 to 1974.

== Construction and commissioning ==
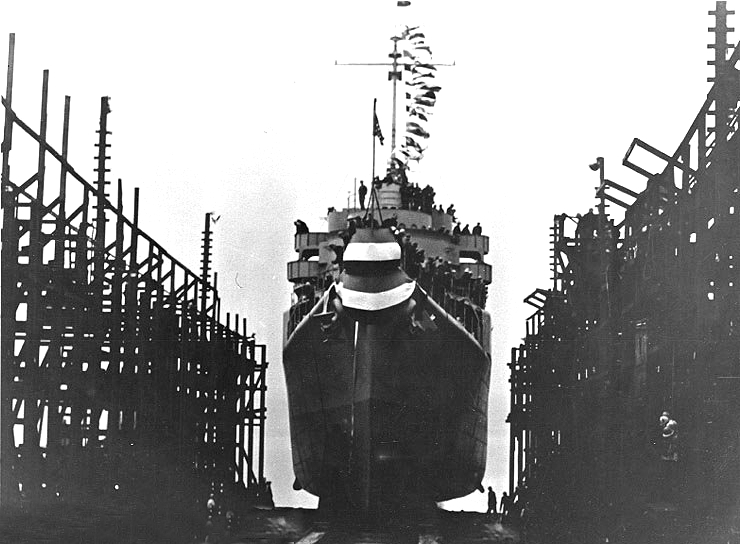
USS Gardiners Bay (AVP-39) is launched on 2 December 1944 at Lake Washington Shipyard, Houghton, Washington.

Gardiners Bay was launched on 2 December 1944 at Houghton, Washington, by the Lake Washington Shipyard, sponsored by Mrs. George L. Richard. She commissioned at the Puget Sound Naval Shipyard at Bremerton, Washington, on 11 February 1945.

== United States Navy service ==
=== World War II ===
Gardiners Bay departed Seattle, Washington, on 1 March 1945 for shakedown out of San Diego, California, which she completed on 20 April 1945. She then proceeded via Pearl Harbor, Hawaii, to Eniwetok in the Marshall Islands to tend the seaplanes of Patrol Bombing Squadron 19 (VPB-19) in a 10-day training period, thence via Saipan and Guam in the Mariana Islands to Kerama Retto, Okinawa, where she arrived on 7 June 1945 with provisions and cargo for Fleet Air Wing 1.

Gardiners Bay devoted the following weeks to tending planes for various patrol bombing squadrons based on Kerama Retto. Between 30 June 1945 and 17 July 1945 she was flagship of an Air-Sea Rescue Unit, utilizing Rescue Squadrons 3 and 4, Motor Torpedo Boat Squadron 4, and three other seaplane tenders. She accomplished 18 rescue missions while in a state of constant alert that saw her men at general quarters for 100 hours.

Relieved as flagship by the seaplane tender USS Pine Island (AV-12) on 17 July 1945, Gardiners Bay tended the seaplanes of Rescue Squadron 6 at Chimi Bay, Okinawa, until 15 August 1945, the day hostilities with Japan ended, when she put to sea as part of the screen of the United States Third Fleet en route Japan.

==== Honors and awards ====
Gardiners Bay received two battle stars for service in World War II.

=== Post-World War II, 1945-1950 ===
Gardiners Bay entered Sagami Bay, Japan, on 28 August 1945, shifting on 30 August 1945 to Tokyo Bay as a part of the Seaplane Base Group of the Japan Occupation Forces. On 1 September 1945 she became flagship of the Air-Sea Rescue Unit for the Third Fleet with Rescue Squadron 4 based on board. During this service, which extended to 9 January 1946, she helped set up the Tokyo Seadrome off the Yokohama Air Station. She was then stationed at Nagoya, Japan, as tender for courier and transient seaplanes, departing on 29 January 1946 for Shanghai, China. She departed Hong Kong on 9 August 1946, proceeding via Yokosuka, Japan, the Mariana Islands, the Marshall Islands, and Pearl Harbor to the Puget Sound Naval Shipyard at Bremerton, Washington, where she arrived on 28 November 1946 for overhaul.

After fleet exercises along the West Coast of the United States, Gardiners Bay departed San Diego on 7 April 1947 for seaplane tender duties in the Caroline Islands; Mariana Islands; Okinawa; Qingdao, China; and Yokosuka. She returned to Seattle on 4 October 1947, made a cruise to Eniwetok in the Marshall Islands between 15 January 1948 and 5 June 1948, and made another cruise to East Asia between 15 March 1949 and 14 December 1949 which included seaplane tender operations at Guam; Yokohama, Japan; Sasebo, Japan; Okinawa; and Manila in the Philippines.

=== Korean War service ===
The Korean War broke out on 25 June 1950, and Gardiners Bay departed San Diego on 27 June 1950 for the first of four long tours supporting United Nations forces in Korea. She established a seadrome at Iwakuni, Japan, tending 17 PBM Mariner and eight Royal Air Force Short Sunderland flying boats for search and reconnaissance in the Tsushima Strait and Yellow Sea area, shifting in September 1950 to Inchon, Korea, where she established an advance base for seaplanes making naval mine reconnaissance runs off the northwest coast of Korea. In October 1950 she established another seadrome at Chinhae, Korea, basing there to tend United States Seventh Fleet aircraft conducting reconnaissance until 16 April 1951.

On her second Korean tour, which lasted from 12 September 1951 to 9 April 1952, Gardiners Bay supported aviation patrol units at Okinawa, Iwakuni, and Manila.

Gardiners Bay spent her third Korean War tour, which lasted from 10 July 1952 to 26 January 1953, largely as station ship off the Pescadores and at Okinawa. She took time out from this duty in October 1952 for participation in Exercise Surprise off the coast of French Indochina, testing communications between headquarters and ships and aircraft of the United States, the United Kingdom, and France.

Gardiners Bay's fourth Korean War tour, which lasted from 3 April 1953 to 12 December 1953, was spent in tending amphibious patrol planes at Chinhae, South Korea, and on stations in the Pescadore Islands, the Philippine Islands, Okinawa, and Japan. The Korean War ended during this tour, on 27 July 1953.

==== Honors and awards ====
Gardiners Bay received four battle stars for service in the Korean War.

=== 1954-1958 ===
After returning from her fourth Korean War tour in December 1953, Gardiners Bay made three cruises to support U.S. Seventh Fleet operations in the Pacific, from 7 July 1954 to 22 November 1954, from 28 August 1956 to 14 February 1957, and from 10 June 1957 to 16 November 1957. She spent these cruises largely on seaplane tending stations at Okinawa, at Manila, and in the Japanese ports of Iwakuni, Sasebo, and Yokohama.

Gardiners Bay returned from her last cruise in U.S. Navy service on 16 November 1957, arriving at Alameda, California. She was decommissioned on 1 February 1958.

=== Awards ===
During her career with the U.S. Navy, Gardiners Bay earned the following awards -

- Asiatic-Pacific Campaign Medal with two battle stars
- World War II Victory Medal
- Navy Occupation Medal with "ASIA" clasp
- China Service Medal
- National Defense Service Medal
- Korean Service Medal with four battle stars
- United Nations Service Medal

== Royal Norwegian Navy service ==
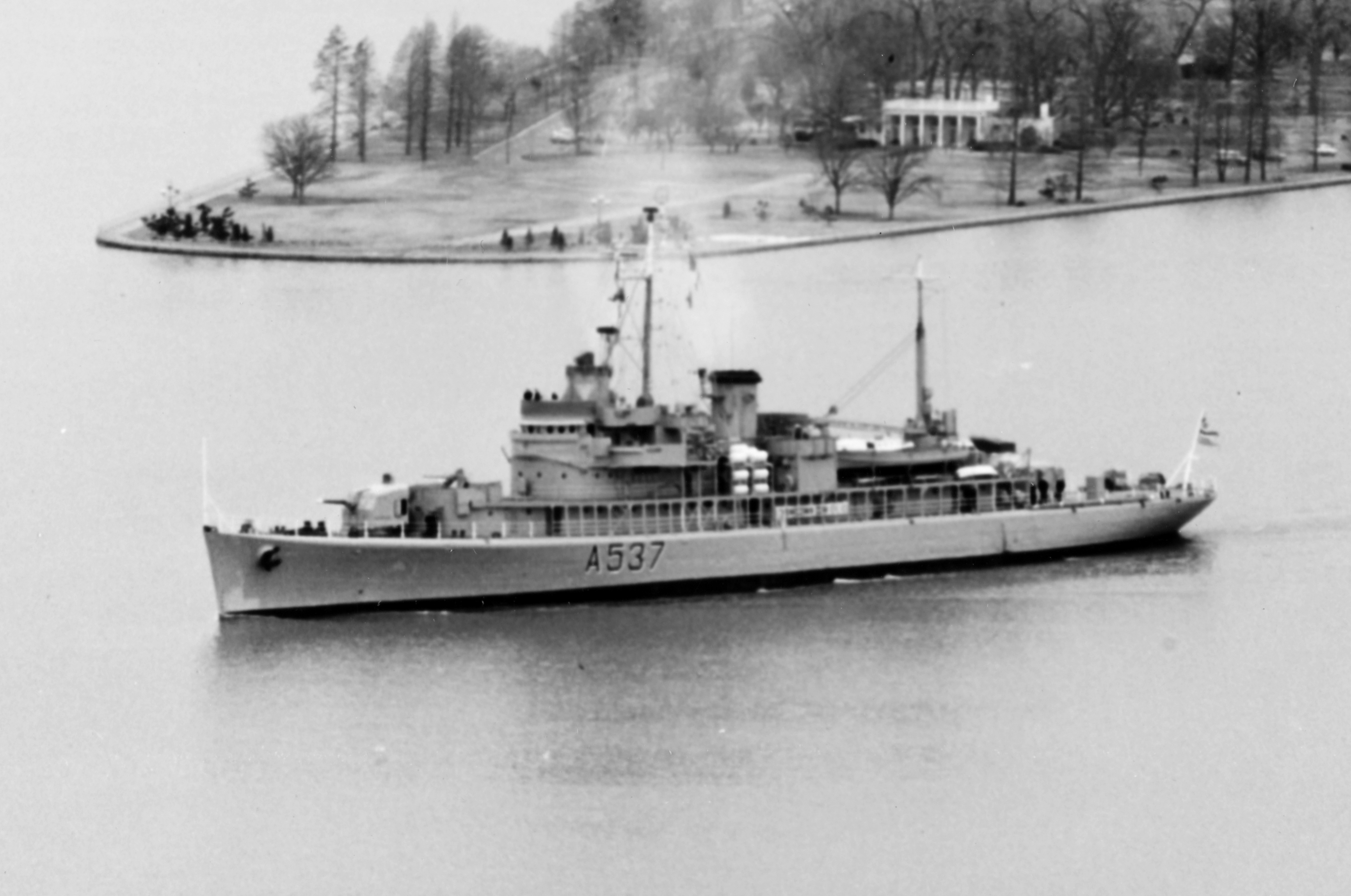
HNoMS Haakon VII (A537) at Washington, D.C., on 9 March 1970, just after departing the Washington Navy Yard. She is at the mouth of the Anacostia River and about to enter the Potomac River.

Gardiners Bay was transferred to Norway on 17 May 1958 under the Military Assistance Program. After undergoing conversion and rearming, she was commissioned into the Royal Norwegian Navy as the training ship HNoMS Haakon VII (A537) (in Norwegian, KNM Haakon VII (A537)).

Conducting naval cadet training cruises, Haakon VII visited ports all over the world during her 16 years of Royal Norwegian Navy service.

=== Final disposition ===
Haakon VII was stricken and disposed of in 1974.

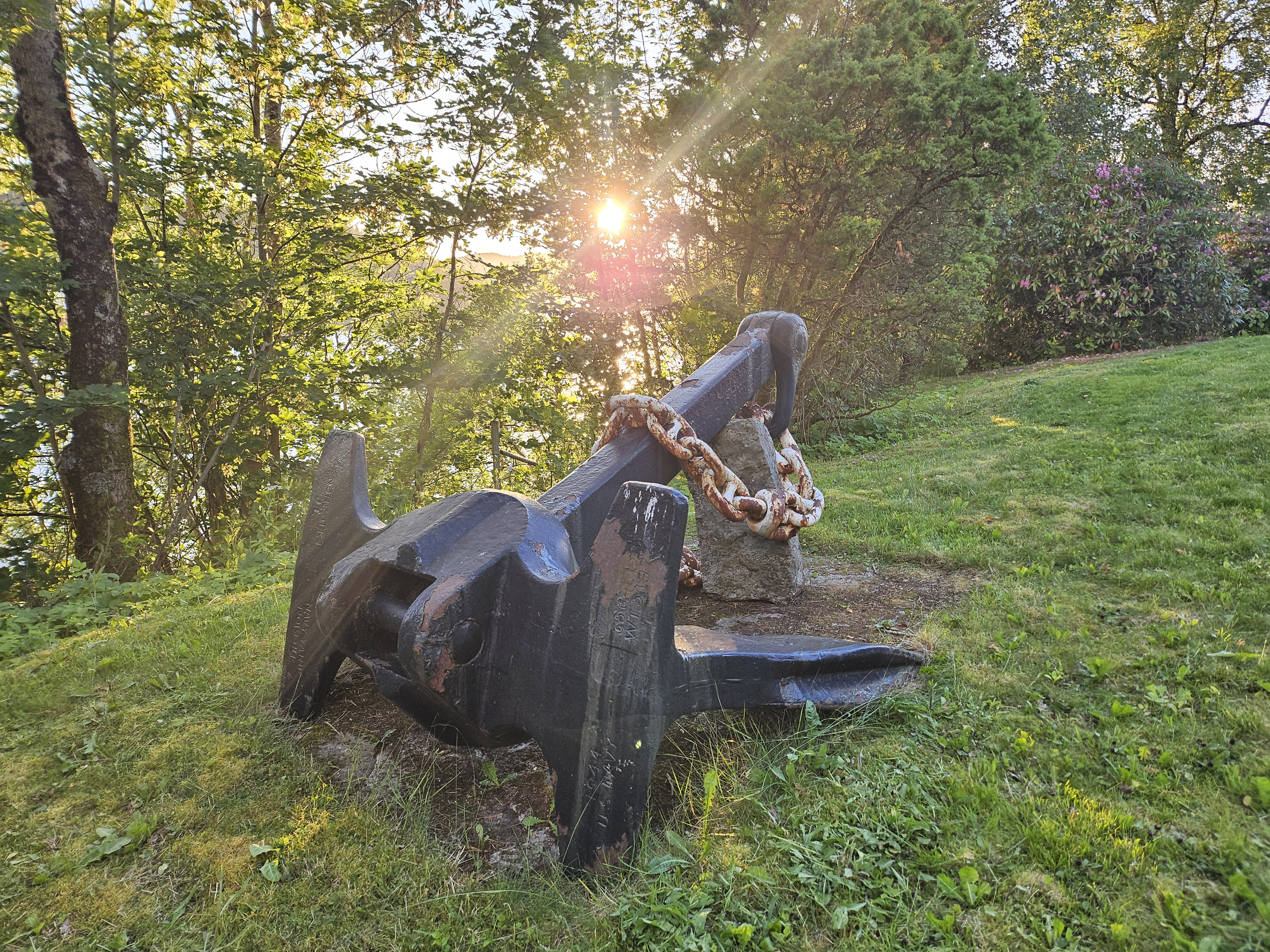
The anchor of USS Gardiners Bay/KNM "Haakon VII" lies today in a private garden in Laksevåg near Bergen, Norway.
