= USS Corson =

Tender of the United States Navy

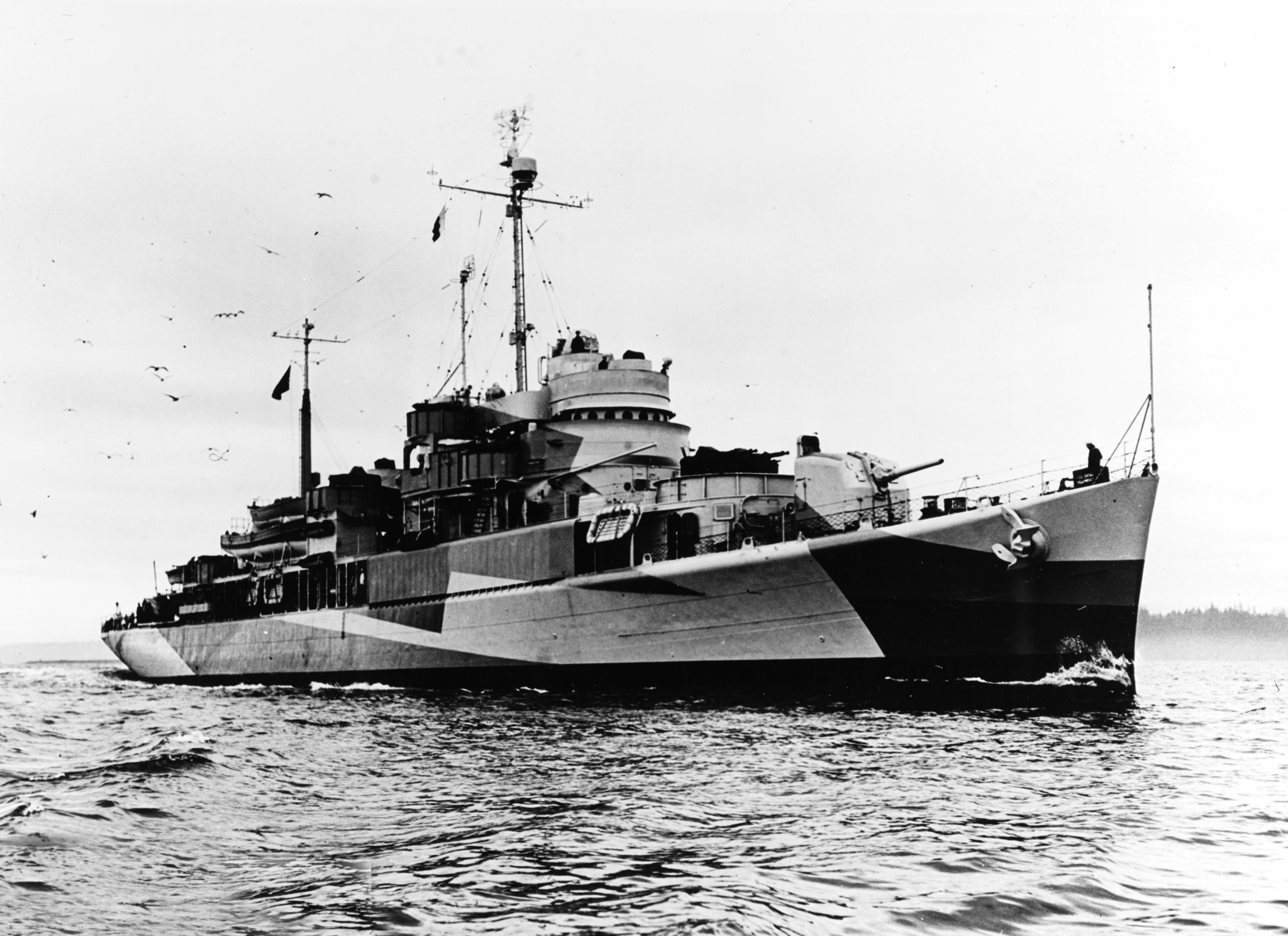
- USS Corson (AVP-37) off Houghton, Washington, on 29 November 1944.

History

United States
- Name: USS Corson
- Namesake: Corson Inlet, at Cape May on the New Jersey coast
- Builder: Lake Washington Shipyard, Houghton, Washington
- Launched: 16 July 1944
- Sponsored by: Mrs. G. A. Hatton
- Commissioned: 3 December 1944
- Decommissioned: 21 June 1946
- Recommissioned: 13 February 1951
- Decommissioned: 9 March 1956
- Stricken: 1 April 1966
- Fate: Sunk as target 1966

General characteristics
- Class & type: Barnegat-class small seaplane tender
- Displacement: 1,766 tons (light); 2,750 tons (full load)
- Length: 310 ft 9 in (94.72 m)
- Beam: 41 ft 1 in (12.52 m)
- Draught: 13 ft 6 in (4.11 m)
- Installed power: 6,000 horsepower (4.48 megawatts)
- Propulsion: Diesel engines, two shafts
- Speed: 18.6 knots (34.4 km/h)
- Complement: 215 (ship's company); 367 (including aviation unit)
- Sensors & processing systems: Radar; sonar
- Armament: 2 × single 5 in (130 mm) 38-caliber dual-purpose gun mounts; 4 × 20-mm antiaircraft guns; 2 × depth charge tracks
- Aviation facilities: Supplies, spare parts, repairs, and berthing for one seaplane squadron; 80,000 US gallons (300,000 L) aviation fuel

USS Corson (AVP-37) was a United States Navy Barnegat-class small seaplane tender in commission from 1944 to 1946 and from 1951 to 1956.

== Construction and commissioning ==
Corson was launched on 16 July 1944 by Lake Washington Shipyard, Houghton, Washington, sponsored by Mrs. G. A. Hatton. Corson was commissioned 3 December 1944.

== World War II operations ==
Corson departed San Diego, California, on 12 February 1945, tended seaplanes briefly at Pearl Harbor, Hawaii, and at Eniwetok, and moved on to reach Ulithi Atoll on 1 April 1945. In addition to seaplane tending duty at Ulithi, she made two voyages to the Palau Islands in May 1945 and participated in the bombardment of Eil Malk Island on 7 May 1945.

Corson left Ulithi on 24 June 1945. She served at Eniwetok from 1 July to 7 August 1945. She then moved on to Okinawa, arriving there on 15 August 1945, the day hostilities with Japan ceased and World War II came to an end.

== Peacetime service 1945-1946 ==
Corson departed Okinawa on 10 September 1945 and dropped anchor at Nagasaki, Japan, on 11 September 1945. She tended seaplanes at Nagasaki, at Sasebo, and in Hiro Bay until 20 January 1946, when she departed for Pearl Harbor and Alameda, California, where she arrived on 9 February 1946 for inactivation. Corson was decommissioned and placed in reserve at Alameda on 21 June 1946.

== Korean War service 1951-1953 ==
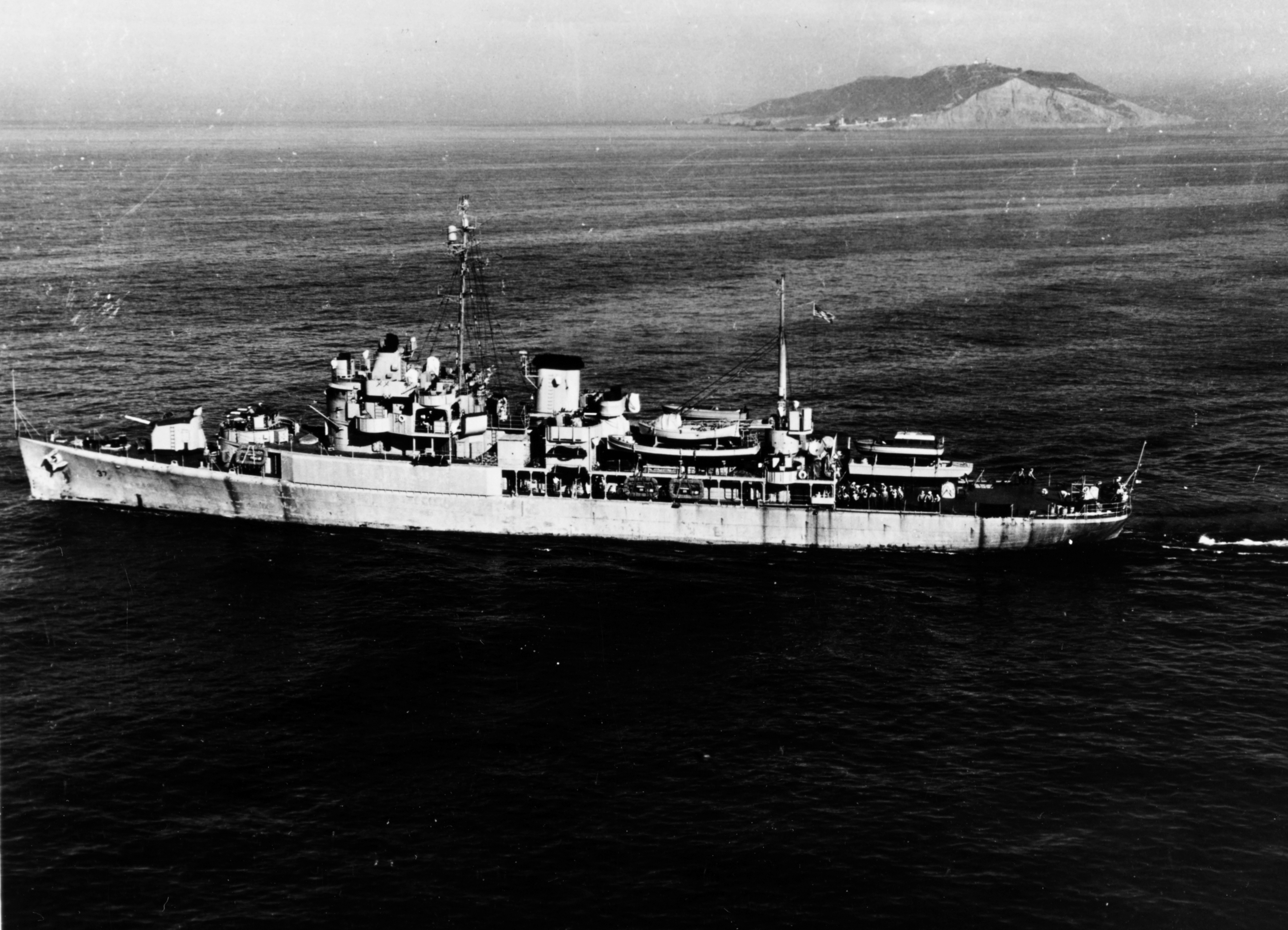
USS Corson (AVP-37) off San Diego, California, in 1951.

Corson was recommissioned on 13 February 1951 for service in the Korean War. She departed Long Beach, California, on 17 April 1951 for Okinawa, where she served as station tender from 11 May 1951 to 7 October 1951. She returned to Alameda on 26 October 1951.

Corson tended seaplanes at San Diego until her next tour of duty in the Western Pacific, which lasted from 8 December 1952 to 4 August 1953. During this tour, she tended seaplanes in Japan, at Okinawa, and in the Pescadores.

== Peacetime service 1954-1956 ==
Corson returned to the Western Pacific to tend seaplanes off Japan from 4 January 1954 to 5 August 1954, and again from 17 January 1955 to 24 July 1955. During this tour, she served as station tender at Hong Kong, conducted reserve training at Subic Bay at Luzon in the Philippine Islands, laid a seadrome in the Pescadores, acted as advance base support at Keelung, Taiwan, and served as plane guard off Indonesia for United States Air Force jet aircraft flying to Bangkok, Thailand, on a good-will mission.

== Final decommissioning and disposal ==
Returning to Alameda, Corson was again placed out of commission in reserve on 9 March 1956. She was laid up in the Pacific Reserve Fleet.

Corson was struck from the Naval Vessel Register on 1 April 1966. She was sunk as a target later that year.
