= USS Matanzas =

Tender of the United States Navy

History

United States
- Name: USS Matanzas (AVP-46)
- Namesake: Matanzas Inlet in Florida
- Awarded: 14 April 1942
- Builder: Lake Washington Shipyard, Houghton, Washington (proposed)
- Laid down: Never
- Fate: Construction contract cancelled 29 April 1943

General characteristics
- Class & type: Barnegat-class small seaplane tender
- Displacement: 1,766 tons (light); 2,750 tons (full load)
- Length: 311 ft 8 in (95.00 m)
- Beam: 41 ft 1 in (12.52 m)
- Draught: 13 ft 6 in (4.11 m)
- Installed power: 6,000 horsepower (4.48 megawatts)
- Propulsion: Diesel engines, two shafts
- Speed: 18.6 knots (34.4 km/h)
- Complement: 215 (ship's company); 367 (including aviation unit)
- Sensors & processing systems: Radar; sonar
- Armament: Probably either 2 x 5-inch (127 mm) 38-caliber guns, 4 x 20-mm antiaircraft guns, and 2 x depth charge tracks, or 1 x 5-inch (127 mm) 38-caliber gun, 1 x quadruple 40-mm antiaircraft gun mount, 2 x twin 40-mm gun mounts, 6 x 20-mm antiaircraft guns, and 2 x depth charge tracks
- Aviation facilities: Supplies, spare parts, fuel, repairs, and berthing for one seaplane squadron; 80,000 US gallons (300,000 L) aviation fuel

USS Matanzas (AVP-46) was a proposed United States Navy seaplane tender that was never laid down.

== Construction and commissioning ==
Matanzas was to have been one of 41 Barnegat-class small seaplane tenders the U.S. Navy planned to commission during the early 1940s, and was to have been built at Houghton, Washington, by the Lake Washington Shipyard. However, by the spring of 1943 the Navy deemed that number of seaplane tenders excess to requirements, and decided to complete four of them as motor torpedo boat tenders and one as a catapult training ship. In addition, the Navy also decided to cancel six of the Barnegat-class ships prior to their construction, freeing up the diesel engines that would have powered them for use in escort vessels and amphibious landing craft.

A contract with Lake Washington Shipyard for AVP-46's construction was let on 14 April 1942, and she was assigned the name Magothy on 23 August 1942. However, she became one of the final two ships to be cancelled when the Navy cancelled the contract on 29 April 1943 before construction could begin.
