= Barnegat-class seaplane tender =

US Navy seaplane tender class during WWII

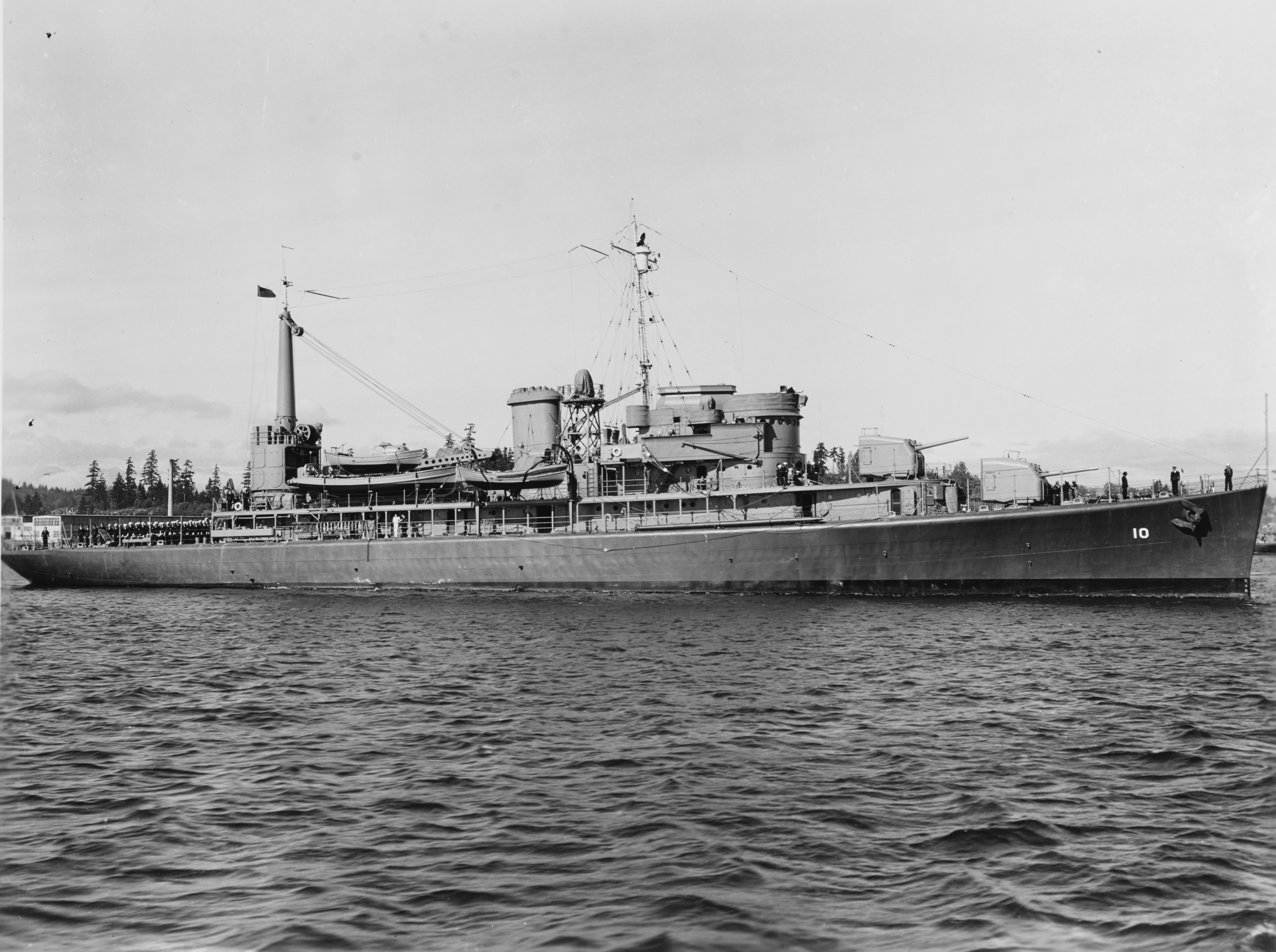
- USS Barnegat (AVP-10), lead ship of the Barnegat-class small seaplane tenders, in Puget Sound on 14 October 1941

Class overview
- Name: Barnegat
- Builders: Puget Sound Navy Yard, Bremerton, Washington (4 ships); Boston Navy Yard, Boston, Massachusetts (2 ships); Lake Washington Shipyard, Houghton, Washington (24 ships); Puget Sound Navy Yard and Lake Washington Shipyard (1 ship); Associated Shipbuilders, Inc., Seattle, Washington (4 ships)
- Operators: United States Navy; United States Coast Guard; United States Coast and Geodetic Survey; Ethiopian Navy; Hellenic Navy; Italian Navy; Royal Norwegian Navy; Philippine Navy; Vietnam People's Navy; Republic of Vietnam Navy
- Preceded by: Lapwing class
- Succeeded by: None
- Built: October 1939-July 1946
- In commission: July 1941-January 1973
- Planned: 41
- Completed: 35 total; 30 as seaplane tenders; 4 as motor torpedo boat tenders; 1 as catapult training ship
- Canceled: 6
- Lost: 0
- Retired: 35
- Preserved: 0

General characteristics
- Class & type: Barnegat-class small seaplane tender
- Displacement: 2,040 tons standard; 2,551 tons full load
- Length: 310 ft 9 in (94.72 m) overall; 300 ft 0 in (91.44 m) (waterline)
- Beam: 41 ft 1 in (12.52 m)
- Draft: 12 ft 5 in (3.78 m) full
- Installed power: 6,000 to 6,080 horsepower (4.48 to 4.54 MW)
- Propulsion: Diesel engine, two shafts
- Speed: 20 knots (37 km/h) 23 mph
- Range: 6,000 nmi (11,000 km; 6,900 mi) at 12 knots (22 km/h) 13.5 mph
- Capacity: 80,000 US gallons (300,000 L) aviation fuel
- Complement: 215 (ship's company); 367 (including aviation unit)
- Sensors & processing systems: Radar, sonar
- Armament: Designed: 2 × 5-inch (127-millimeter) guns; Assigned 1942 (rarely fully installed): 4 × 5-inch (127-mm) guns, 8 × 20 mm antiaircraft guns, plus in some units 2 × depth charge racks; 1944: Either 2 × 5-inch (127-mm) guns and 4 × 20 mm antiaircraft guns or 1 × 5-inch (127-mm) gun, 1 × quadruple 40 mm antiaircraft gun mount, 2 × twin 40 mm gun mounts, and 6 × 20 mm antiaircraft guns (also Mousetrap aboard Coos Bay only).
- Aviation facilities: Supplies, fuel, berthing, and repairs for one squadron of seaplanes

The Barnegat class was a large class of United States Navy small seaplane tenders (AVP) built during World War II. Thirty were completed as seaplane tenders, four as motor torpedo boat tenders, and one as a catapult training ship.

== Design ==
After relying on improvised and converted vessels to support seaplanes through most of the interwar period, in the five years before the Attack on Pearl Harbor the United States Navy received long-sought funding for the construction of two types of new-build seaplane tenders to support the operation of flying boats attached to Patrol (VP) Squadrons from undeveloped islands and atolls. Full-size seaplane tenders (AVs) were designed to support two squadrons each, but they were more expensive to build and had a deep draft, precluding their use in shallow harbors. The U.S. Navy therefore also ordered a sizable number (41) of "small seaplane tenders" (AVPs), the Barnegat class, with a shallower draft, capable of supporting only one squadron each, but cheaper to build and able to operate in shallow waters. Both the full-size and small seaplane tenders were designed to provide supplies, spare parts, fuel, repairs, and berthing for assigned seaplane squadrons, and were well-armed so that they could serve as the primary line of defense of the seaplane bases they set up.

The Barnegat-class ships were the first (and only) purpose-built AVPs, prior ships carrying that designation having been Lapwing-class minesweepers pressed into service as tenders from 1918 onward. They were preceded into service by 14 "Seaplane Tenders (Destroyer)" (AVDs), interim vessels converted from old destroyers because, with war imminent, completion of enough Barnegats to meet pressing needs could not be guaranteed.

The Barnegat design was derived from those of two other recent classes of ship: the two-strong Erie class of gunboats, and the seven-strong Treasury-class of Coast Guard cutters, all built in 1936-1937. The Barnegats were reliable, long-ranged, and seaworthy, and had good habitability, having been built with berthing capacity for an entire flying-boat squadron's aircrews. They were also well-armed, equipped with between one and four 5-inch (127-millimeter) 38-caliber dual-purpose main guns, as well as varying numbers of 20 mm and 40 mm antiaircraft guns, and depth charge racks and sonar for antisubmarine work. The armament was reduced after the war; those ships in commission as survey ships were entirely unarmed by 1959.

The ships' size and armament enabled them to take on numerous assignments other than their intended ones, including convoy escort, shore bombardment, tanking, and troop and cargo transport duties. Nonetheless, in the spring of 1943, the U.S. Navy concluded that the number of Barnegats ordered was excess to requirements. Four of them were therefore converted during construction into motor torpedo boat tenders, while a fifth was modified during construction for use as a catapult training ship for battleship and cruiser floatplane pilots, her catapult equipment coming from that manufactured for canceled Cleveland-class light cruisers. Six other Barnegats were canceled—four on 22 April 1943 and two more on 29 April 1943 – without having been laid down, their diesel engines being needed for various escort ships and amphibious landing craft.

Three Barnegats were selected in 1945 for conversion to press information ships in anticipation of the 1945–1946 invasion of Japan, but when the war ended without this invasion being necessary they were converted back into seaplane tenders.

== Naming ==
The class was named for its lead unit, Barnegat. A few of the ships were named after islands, but the vast majority were named after bodies of water, mostly bays, sounds, and inlets, around the United States and the then-Territory of Alaska.

== Post-War Careers ==
The ships entered service between 1941 and 1946, and all but three of them were commissioned in time to participate in combat actions in World War II. The motor torpedo boat tenders served in the Pacific during the latter half of the war, while the seaplane tenders saw service in virtually every theater in which the United States Navy operated during the war.

The combination of the post-World War II downsizing of the U.S. Navy and the decline of the seaplane and motor torpedo boat in U.S. naval operations meant that all but the newest ships decommissioned in 1946 and 1947. Those that did stay on in service as seaplane tenders decommissioned between the mid-1950s and 1960s, some seeing service in the Korean War (1950–1953). The last unit did not leave U.S. Navy service until 1973.

However, the ships proved versatile and durable, and had long second lives postwar. Between c. 1949 and 1965 three served, on a rotating basis, as flagships for the Commander, Middle Eastern Forces, before one, Valcour, took on the job permanently, under the revised designation of AGF-1, serving until 1971. Some became oceanographic and hydrographic survey ships, either in U.S. Navy, United States Coast and Geodetic Survey, or Greek service. Eighteen were transferred to the United States Coast Guard – where they became known as Casco-class cutters – between 1946 and 1949 for service mostly as weather reporting ships, a role they played until the late 1960s and early 1970s; some of the Coast Guard ships saw service in the Vietnam War, and one survived as a cutter until 1988. A number of the units of the class were transferred to foreign navies, including those of Ethiopia, Italy, Norway, the Philippines, and South Vietnam, for use as patrol vessels and training ships, and a few saw commercial service as cruise ships in Greece. The murky information available on a unit incorporated into the Vietnam People's Navy after the fall of South Vietnam in 1975 suggests that she remained active until at least 2000 and may remain active today; even if reports of her longevity are inaccurate, the last member of this large and long-lived class of ships did not leave service until 1993, when the ship transferred to Italy was decommissioned by the Italian Navy.

== Ships ==
=== USS Barnegat (AVP-10) ===
Barnegat, lead unit of the class, was commissioned in July 1941. She served in the Atlantic until February 1945, then finished World War II in the Pacific. She was in reserve from 1945 to 1958, then was sold into commercial service and was the Greek cruise ship MV Kentavros from 1962 to 1986.

=== USS Biscayne (AVP-11, later AGC-18) ===
Biscayne was in commission from 1941 to 1946. During the first half of World War II, she saw service as a seaplane tender in the Atlantic, in the Caribbean, in West Africa, and in North Africa. Converted into an amphibious force flagship in 1943, she served in the Mediterranean in 1943–1944, seeing action in the amphibious landings in Operation Avalanche at Salerno, Operation Shingle at Anzio, and Operation Dragoon in southern France. Redesignated AGC-18 in 1944, she then served in the Pacific in 1945, serving at Iwo Jima, in the Okinawa campaign, and in the Philippines before the war ended. Postwar, she served in Korea and China. She was transferred to the U.S. Coast Guard postwar as USCGC Dexter (WAGC-18), later WAVP-385, later WHEC-385, and was in commissioned Coast Guard service from 1949 to 1952 and from 1958 to 1968.

=== USS Casco (AVP-12) ===
Casco was in commission from 1941 to 1947, performing her World War II service in the Pacific. She was transferred to the U.S. Coast Guard postwar as USCGC Casco (WAVP-370), later WHEC-370, and was in commissioned Coast Guard service from 1949 to 1969.

=== USS Mackinac (AVP-13) ===
Mackinac was in commission from 1942 to 1946, performing her World War II service in the Pacific. She was transferred to the U.S. Coast Guard postwar as USCGC Mackinac (WAVP-371), later WHEC-371, and was in commissioned Coast Guard service from 1949 to 1968.

=== USS Humboldt (AVP-21) ===
Humboldt was in commission from 1941 to 1947, performing her World War II service in the Atlantic and Mediterranean, where during the Natal Conference, she flew the Commander-in-Chief's flag. She was among three Barnegat-class ships selected in 1945 for conversion to a press information ship, redesignated AG-121, for the projected invasion of Japan in 1945–1946, but the war ended before the invasion could take place and she was converted back into a seaplane tender. She was transferred to the U.S. Coast Guard postwar as USCGC Humboldt (WAVP-372), later WHEC-372, and was in commissioned Coast Guard service from 1949 to 1969.

=== USS Matagorda (AVP-22) ===
Matagorda was in commission from 1941 to 1946, performing her World War II service in the Atlantic. She was among three Barnegat-class ships selected in 1945 for conversion to a press information ship, redesignated AG-122, for the projected invasion of Japan in 1945–1946, but the war ended before the invasion could take place and she was converted back into a seaplane tender. She was transferred to the U.S. Coast Guard postwar as USCGC Matagorda (WAVP-373), later WHEC-373, and was in commissioned Coast Guard service from 1949 to 1968.

=== USS Absecon (AVP-23) ===
Absecon was in commission from 1943 to 1947. She was converted while under construction into a catapult training ship, and spent World War II in Florida waters training battleship and cruiser floatplane pilots in catapult launches, also serving as a mobile target for torpedo planes. She was transferred to the U.S. Coast Guard postwar as USCGC Absecon (WAVP-374), later WHEC-374, and was in commissioned Coast Guard service from 1949 to 1972. She was transferred to South Vietnam in 1972 and served in the Republic of Vietnam Navy as the frigate RVNS Phạm Ngũ Lão (HQ-15) until captured by North Vietnam on the collapse of the South Vietnamese government at the end of the Vietnam War in 1975. She then served the Socialist Republic of Vietnam in the Vietnam People's Navy as the patrol vessel PRVSN Phạm Ngũ Lão (HQ-01) and participated in naval operations against the Khmer Rouge during the Cambodian-Vietnamese War. She continued her service with the Vietnamese Navy until perhaps as late as 2000.

=== USS Chincoteague (AVP-24) ===
Chincoteague was in commission from 1943 to 1946, performing her World War II service in the Pacific. She was transferred to the U.S. Coast Guard postwar as USCGC Chincoteague (WAVP-375), later WHEC-375, and was in commissioned Coast Guard service from 1949 to 1972. She was transferred to South Vietnam in 1972 and served in the Republic of Vietnam Navy as the frigate RVNS Lý Thường Kiệt (HQ-16). Upon the collapse of the South Vietnamese government at the end of the Vietnam War in 1975, she fled to the Philippines. She served in the Philippine Navy from 1975 to 1985 as the frigate RPS (later BRP) Andrés Bonifacio (PF-7).

=== USS Coos Bay (AVP-25) ===
Coos Bay was in commission from 1943 to 1946, performing her World War II service in the Pacific. She was transferred to the U.S. Coast Guard postwar as USCGC Coos Bay (WAVP-376), later WHEC-376, and was in commissioned Coast Guard service from 1949 to 1966.

=== USS Half Moon (AVP-26, ex-AGP-6, ex-AVP-26) ===
Half Moon was laid down as a seaplane tender, then was chosen as one of four Barnegat-class ships to be converted to a motor torpedo boat tender prior to completion and redesignated AGP-6, but ultimately was completed as a seaplane tender, with her sister ship Oyster Bay becoming the motor torpedo tender AGP-6 instead. She was in commission from 1943 to 1946, performing her World War II service in the Pacific, where she saw action in the New Guinea campaign and the Philippines campaign. She was transferred to the U.S. Coast Guard postwar as USCGC Half Moon (WAVP-378), later WHEC-378, and was in commissioned Coast Guard service from 1948 to 1969.

=== USS Mobjack (AGP-7, ex-AVP-27) ===
Mobjack was one of four Barnegat-class ships to be converted during construction into a motor torpedo boat tender. She was in commission from 1943 to 1946, performing her World War II service in the Pacific, supporting operations at Morotai, in the Philippines campaign, and in the Borneo campaign. She was transferred to the United States Coast and Geodetic Survey postwar, serving as the survey ship USC&GS Pioneer (OSS 31) until 1966.

=== USS Oyster Bay (AGP-6, ex-AVP-28) ===
Oyster Bay was one of four Barnegat-class ships to be converted during construction into a motor torpedo boat tender. She was in commission from 1943 to 1946, performing her World War II service in the Pacific, where she saw action in the New Guinea and Philippine campaigns. Stricken from the Navy List in 1946, she was reinstated as a seaplane tender in 1949 and kept in reserve until 1957. She was transferred to Italy in 1957, serving in the Italian Navy until 1993 as the special forces tender Pietro Cavezzale (A 5301).

=== USS Rockaway (AVP-29) ===
Rockaway was in commission from 1943 to 1946, performing her World War II service in the Atlantic and Mediterranean. She was among three Barnegat-class ships selected in 1945 for conversion to a press information ship, redesignated AG-123, for the projected invasion of Japan in 1945–1946, but the war ended before the invasion could take place and she was converted back into a seaplane tender. She was transferred to the U.S. Coast Guard postwar as USCGC Rockaway (WAVP-377), later WAGO-377, WHEC-377, and WOLE-377, and was in commissioned Coast Guard service from 1948 to 1972.

=== USS San Pablo (AVP-30, later AGS-30) ===
San Pablo was in commission from 1943 to 1947 as a seaplane tender, performing her World War II service in the Pacific, where she saw action in the Southwest Pacific, the New Guinea campaign, the Central Pacific, and the Philippines campaign. She recommissioned in 1948 after conversion to a hydrographic survey ship, redesignated AGS-30, and served in this capacity until 1969.

=== USS Unimak (AVP-31) ===
Unimak was in commission from 1943 to 1946, performing her World War II service in the Pacific through the end of 1944, then in the Atlantic during the first half of 1945. She was transferred to the U.S. Coast Guard postwar as USCGC Unimak (WAVP-379), later WHEC-379, later WTR-379, and was in commissioned Coast Guard service from 1949 to 1975 and from 1977 to 1988.

=== USS Yakutat (AVP-32) ===
Yakutat was in commission from 1944 to 1946, performing her World War II service in the Pacific, where she supported the Peleliu, Mariana Islands, and Okinawa campaigns. She was transferred to the U.S. Coast Guard postwar as USCGC Yakutat (WAVP-380), later WHEC-380, and was in commissioned Coast Guard service from 1948 to 1971. She was transferred to South Vietnam in 1971 and served in the Republic of Vietnam Navy as the frigate RVNS Trần Nhật Duật (HQ-03). Upon the collapse of the South Vietnamese government at the end of the Vietnam War in 1975, she fled to the Philippines, where the Philippine Navy took custody of her and cannibalized her for spare parts until discarding her in 1982.

=== USS Barataria (AVP-33) ===
Barataria was in commission from 1944 to 1946, performing her World War II service in the Pacific, where she saw action in the Philippines campaign. She was transferred to the U.S. Coast Guard postwar as USCGC Barataria (WAVP-381), later WHEC-381, and was in commissioned Coast Guard service from 1948 to 1969.

=== USS Bering Strait (AVP-34) ===
Bering Strait was in commission from 1944 to 1946, performing her World War II service in the Central Pacific, where she saw action in the Okinawa campaign. She was transferred to the U.S. Coast Guard postwar as USCGC Bering Strait (WAVP-382), later WHEC-382, and was in commissioned Coast Guard service from 1948 to 1971. She was transferred to South Vietnam in 1971 and served in the Republic of Vietnam Navy as the frigate RVNS Trần Quang Khải (HQ-02). Upon the collapse of the South Vietnamese government at the end of the Vietnam War in 1975, she fled to the Philippines, and served in the Philippine Navy from 1975 until 1985 as the frigate BRP Diego Silang (PF-9) and from 1987 to 1990 as BRP Diego Silang (PF-14).

=== USS Castle Rock (AVP-35) ===
Castle Rock was in commission from 1944 to 1946, performing her World War II service in the Pacific. She was transferred to the U.S. Coast Guard postwar as USCGC Castle Rock (WAVP-383), later WHEC-383, and was in commissioned Coast Guard service from 1948 to 1971. She was transferred to South Vietnam in 1971 and served in the Republic of Vietnam Navy as the frigate RVNS Trần Bình Trọng (HQ-05). Upon the collapse of the South Vietnamese government at the end of the Vietnam War in 1975, she fled to the Philippines, and served in the Philippine Navy until 1985 as the frigate RPS (later BRP) Francisco Dagohoy (PF-10).

=== USS Cook Inlet (AVP-36) ===
Cook Inlet was in commission from 1944 to 1946, performing her World War II service in the Pacific, where she served in Hawaii and saw action in the Iwo Jima campaign. She was transferred to the U.S. Coast Guard postwar as USCGC Cook Inlet (WAVP-384), later WHEC-384, and was in commissioned Coast Guard service from 1948 to 1971. She was transferred to South Vietnam in 1971 and served in the Republic of Vietnam Navy as the frigate RVNS Trần Quốc Toản (HQ-06). Upon the collapse of the South Vietnamese government at the end of the Vietnam War in 1975, she fled to the Philippines, where the Philippine Navy took custody of her and cannibalized her for spare parts until discarding her in 1982.

=== USS Corson (AVP-37) ===
Corson was in commission from 1944 to 1946, performing her World War II service in the Central Pacific. She was recommissioned in 1951 and saw service in support of United Nations forces in the Korean War (1950–1953), then remained in commission until 1966.

=== USS Duxbury Bay (AVP-38) ===
Duxbury Bay was in commission from 1944 to 1966. She performed her World War II service in the Central Pacific and in the Okinawa campaign. Postwar she served worldwide.

=== USS Gardiners Bay (AVP-39) ===
Gardiners Bay was in commission from 1945 to 1958, with World War II service in the Okinawa campaign. She also served four tours of duty in support of United Nations forces during the Korean War. In 1958 she was transferred to Norway, where she served as the Royal Norwegian Navy cadet training ship HNoMS Haakon VII (A537) until 1974.

=== USS Floyds Bay (AVP-40) ===
Floyds Bay was in commission from 1945 to 1960. She served at Okinawa at the end of World War II, cruised around the world in 1947–1948, and then served in the Pacific and Far East.

=== USS Greenwich Bay (AVP-41) ===
Greenwich Bay was in commission from 1945 to 1966. She arrived in the Western Pacific just after the end of World War II. She cruised around the world in 1946, then operated in the Pacific before spending most of her career in the Middle East and Mediterranean.

=== USS Hatteras (AVP-42) ===
The contract for the construction of Hatteras was cancelled on 22 April 1943 before she was laid down.

=== USS Hempstead (AVP-43) ===
The contract for the construction of Hempstead was cancelled on 22 April 1943 before she was laid down.

=== USS Kamishak (AVP-44) ===
The contract for the construction of Kamishak was cancelled on 22 April 1943 before she was laid down.

=== USS Magothy (AVP-45) ===
The contract for the construction of Magothy was cancelled on 22 April 1943 before she was laid down.

=== USS Matanzas (AVP-46) ===
The contract for the construction of Matanzas was cancelled on 29 April 1943 before she was laid down.

=== USS Metomkin (AVP-47) ===
The contract for the construction of Metomkin was cancelled on 29 April 1943 before she was laid down.

=== USS Onslow (AVP-48) ===
Onslow was in commission from 1943 to 1947, seeing World War II service in the Central Pacific, Palau Islands, and Okinawa campaign. She was recommissioned in 1951 and saw service in support of United Nations forces in the Korean War (1950–1953), performing four tours in Korea between 1951 and 1955, and then remained in commission until 1960, when she was sold into commercial service in the Philippines for use as a ferry.

=== USS Orca (AVP-49) ===
Orca was in commission from 1944 to 1947, performing her World War II service in the New Guinea and Philippines campaigns. She was again in commission from 1951 to 1960, seeing service the Pacific and Far East (1950–1953). In 1962 she was transferred to Ethiopia, and served as the Ethiopian Navy's largest ship, the training ship Ethiopia (A-01), until 1991.

=== USS Rehoboth (AVP-50, later AGS-50) ===
Rehoboth was in commission from 1944 to 1947, performing her World War II service in the United Kingdom and Brazil. She was recommissioned in 1948 after conversion to an oceanographic survey vessel. Redesignated AGS-50 in 1949, she saw service in this role from 1948 to 1970.

=== USS San Carlos (AVP-51) ===
San Carlos was in commission from 1944 to 1947, performing her World War II service in the Pacific, where she saw action in the Solomon Islands, at Morotai, and Philippines campaign. After years in reserve, she returned to U.S. Navy service in 1958 as the hydrographic survey ship USNS Josiah Willard Gibbs (T-AGOR-1), serving in this role until 1971. In 1971 she was transferred to Greece, where she served in the Hellenic Navy as the motor torpedo boat tender Hephaistos (A413) until 1976.

=== USS Shelikof (AVP-52) ===
Shelikof was in commission from 1944 to 1947, performing her World War II service in the Central Pacific and in the Okinawa campaign. She was in reserve from 1947 to 1960, when she was sold into commercial service. She served as a Greek passenger ship – at first named MV Kypros, then renamed MV Myconos in 1964, MV Artemis in 1973, MV Artemis K in 1974, and MV Golden Princess in 1979 – until she sank in a storm while laid up in 1981.

=== USS Suisun (AVP-53) ===
Suisun was in commission from 1944 to 1955, performing her World War II service in the Central Pacific, then serving postwar in the Pacific and Far East. She was in reserve from 1955 to 1966, then was sunk as a target.

=== USS Timbalier (AVP-54) ===
Timbalier was in commission from 1946 to 1954, performing most of her active service in the Caribbean and along the United States East Coast. She was in reserve from 1954 to 1960, then sold into commercial service. She operated as the Greek cruise ship MV Rodos from 1960 to 1989.

=== USS Valcour (AVP-55, later AGF-1) ===
Valcour was in commission from 1946 to 1973, spending her career in the Atlantic, Mediterranean, and Middle East. In 1965 she was reclassified as a "miscellaneous command flagship", redesignated AGF-1.

=== USS Wachapreague (AGP-8, ex-AVP-56) ===
Wachapreague was one of four Barnegat-class ships to be converted during construction into a motor torpedo boat tender. She was in commission from 1944 to 1946, performing her World War II service in the Pacific, where she saw action in the Philippine and Borneo campaigns. She was transferred to the U.S. Coast Guard postwar as USCGC McCulloch (WAVP-386), later WHEC-386, and was in commissioned Coast Guard service from 1946 to 1972. She was transferred to South Vietnam in 1972 and served in the Republic of Vietnam Navy as the frigate RVNS Ngô Quyền (HQ-17). Upon the collapse of the South Vietnamese government at the end of the Vietnam War in 1975, she fled to the Philippines, and served in the Philippine Navy until 1985 as the frigate RPS (later BRP) Gregorio del Pilar (PF-8) and from 1987 to 1990 as the frigate BRP Gregorio del Pilar (PF-12).

=== USS Willoughby (AGP-9, ex-AVP-57) ===
Willoughby was one of four Barnegat-class ships to be converted during construction into a motor torpedo boat tender. She was in commission from 1944 to 1946, performing her World War II service in the Pacific, where she saw action in the Philippine and Borneo campaigns. She was transferred to the U.S. Coast Guard postwar as USCGC Gresham (WAVP-387), later WHEC-387 and WAGW-387, and was in commissioned Coast Guard service until 1973.
