= USS Suisun =

Tender of the United States Navy

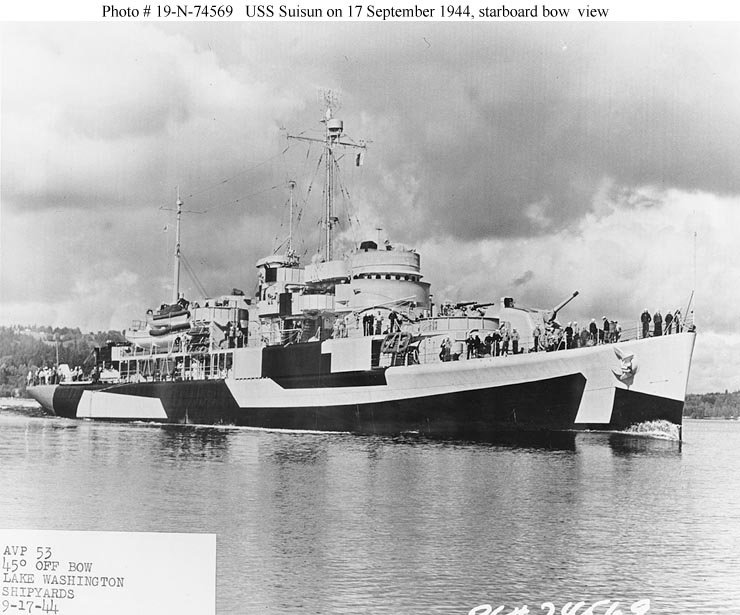
- USS Suisun (AVP-53) off Houghton, Washington, on 17 September 1944

History

United States
- Name: USS Suisun
- Namesake: Suisun Bay, on the coast of California
- Builder: Lake Washington Shipyard, Houghton, Washington
- Laid down: 4 October 1942
- Launched: 14 March 1943
- Sponsored by: Mrs. C. W. Martyr
- Commissioned: 13 September 1944
- Decommissioned: 5 August 1955
- Stricken: 1 April 1966
- Honors and awards: Two battle stars for World War II service; Two battle stars for Korean War service
- Fate: Sunk as target October 1966

General characteristics
- Class & type: Barnegat-class seaplane tender
- Displacement: 1,766 tons (light); 2,592 tons (trial); 2,750 tons (full load)
- Length: 310 ft 9 in (94.72 m)
- Beam: 41 ft 2 in (12.55 m)
- Draft: 13 ft 6 in (4.11 m)
- Depth: 41 ft 2 in (12.55 m)
- Installed power: 6,000 horsepower (4.48 megawatts)
- Propulsion: Diesel engines, two shafts
- Speed: 18 knots (33 km/h)
- Complement: 215 (ship's company); 367 (including aviation unit)
- Sensors & processing systems: Radar; sonar
- Armament: 1 × 5 in (130 mm) gun mount; 2 × quad 40 mm antiaircraft gun mounts; 6 × single 20 mm antiaircraft gun mounts; 2 × depth charge tracks
- Aviation facilities: Supplies, spare parts, repairs, and berthing for one seaplane squadron; 80,000 US gallons (300,000 L) aviation fuel

USS Suisun (AVP-53) was a United States Navy Barnegat-class small seaplane tender in commission from 1944 to 1955. It was named for northern California's Suisun Bay, which takes its name from the Native American Suisun tribe.

== Construction, commissioning, and shakedown ==
Suisun was laid down on 4 October 1942 by Lake Washington Shipyard at Houghton, Washington. She was launched on 14 March 1943, sponsored by Mrs. C. W. Martyr, and commissioned on 13 September 1944.

After fitting out, Suisun steamed to San Diego, California, on 18 October 1944 for her shakedown cruise, which lasted until 21 November 1944. She then had a post-shakedown yard availability period.

== World War II operations 1944-1945 ==
=== Central Pacific operations ===
Suisun departed the United States West Coast for Hawaii on 7 December 1944. She arrived at Pearl Harbor, Hawaii, on 14 December 1944, and departed for Eniwetok in the Marshall Islands on 18 December 1944. She remained at Eniwetok from 26 December 1944 to 1 January 1945, when she sailed to the Marianas Islands. From there she went to Ulithi Atoll in Caroline Islands for three days.

On 13 January 1945, Suisun got underway for Kossol Passage in the Palau Islands, and operated there until 5 February 1945, when she returned to Ulithi. On 8 April 1945 she sailed to the Marianas and operated there until mid-April 1945.

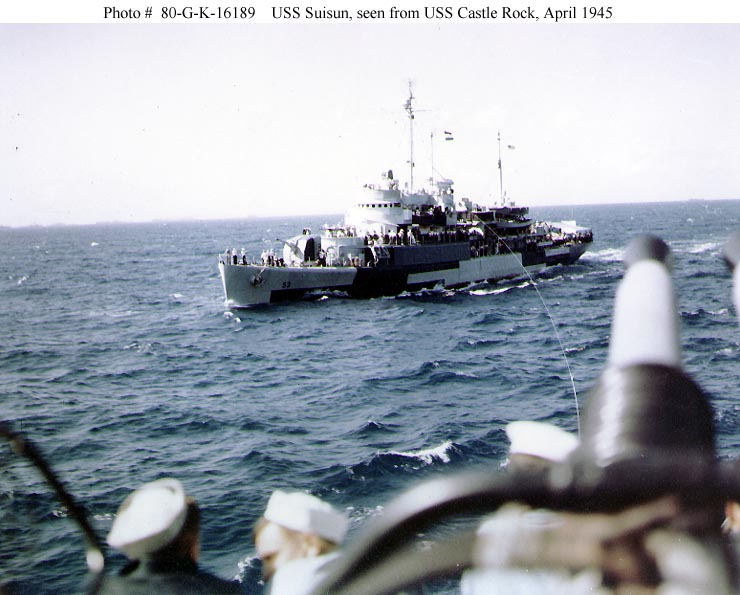
USS Suisun (AVP-53) photographed from seaplane tender USS Castle Rock (AVP-35) off Javapog, Saipan, in April 1945 while passing a line to Castle Rock.

=== Operations in the Ryukyu Islands ===
Suisun departed Saipan in the Marianas on 20 April 1945 and anchored at Kerama Retto in the Ryukyu Islands, on 25 April 1945. She tended seaplanes until forced to leave for Saipan to pick up emergency aviation supplies on 15 June. She returned to Kerama Retto on 26 June 1945 and resumed seaplane tending operations there through the cessation of hostilities with Japan on 15 August 1945, which brought World War II to a close.

=== Honors and awards ===
Suisun received two battle stars for her World War II service.

== Operations in Japan 1945 ==
Suisun departed Kerama Retto for Japan on 16 August 1945. She entered Tokyo Bay on 28 August 1945, the eighth Allied ship to enter Tokyo Bay at the end of the war and was present for Japan's formal surrender ceremony there on 2 September 1945. She operated in Tokyo Bay until 16 November 1945, when she departed for Pearl Harbor. After calling at Pearl Harbor, she continued on to the United States.

== Operations in the Atlantic, Caribbean, and Galápagos Islands 1946-1947 ==
Suisun arrived at San Francisco, California, on 9 December 1945, then was routed onward to the United States East Coast. She steamed into Norfolk, Virginia, on 3 January 1946, and, after an overhaul, operated along the U.S. East Coast until October 1946. She then was home-ported at Coco Solo, Panama Canal Zone. She made training cruises to Trinidad; the Galápagos Islands; Key West, Florida; and San Juan, Puerto Rico.

== Operations in the Pacific 1947-1950 ==
Suisun transited the Panama Canal in early April 1947 and anchored at San Diego on 9 April 1947. On 21 July 1947 she deployed to the Far East and operated between Guam, Okinawa, and Tsingtao, China, until returning to San Diego on 19 January 1948.

Suisun remained on the U.S. West Coast until 15 June 1948 when she began another Far East tour that lasted until 25 November 1948.

From 19 January to 3 March 1949, Suisun participated in Operation Micowex 49A. Ports of call were Seattle, Washington and Sitka, Kodiak, and Cold Bay, Alaska. She operated in Alaskan waters again from 6 July 1949 to 18 August 1949, when she returned to Mare Island Naval Shipyard at Vallejo, California, for an overhaul that lasted into October 1949. She then made a short cruise to Magdalena Bay, Mexico, and returned to San Diego on 4 December 1949.

On 26 April 1950, Suisun sailed to Whidbey Island, Washington, where she loaded Patrol Squadron 6 (VP-6) and ferried it to Naval Air Station Barbers Point, Hawaii. She departed NAS Barbers Point on 12 May 1950 bound for Guam, but was diverted to Yap Island and arrived there on 28 May 1950. On 29 May 1950 she departed Yap en route Koror in the Palau Islands, and from there moved to Sangley Point Naval Base on Luzon in the Philippine Islands.

== Service during the Korean War 1950-1953 ==
Suisun next called at Saipan and Guam before returning to Sangley Point on 2 July 1950. In the meantime, the Korean War had broken out on 25 June 1950.

On 3 July 1950, Suisun sailed for Buckner Bay, Okinawa. She arrived there on 5 July 1950. She serviced and fueled seaplanes of Patrol Squadron 46 (VP-46) until 16 July 1950 when the planes flew, and the ship sailed, to the Pescadores Islands to begin operations from there. From 17 July 1950 to 20 October 1950, Suisun and the squadron were assigned to the United States Seventh Fleet and monitored military activities of the People's Republic of China in case of a Chinese intervention in the Korean War. With that assignment over, Suisun spent ten days in Hong Kong for a leave and upkeep period, then sailed for the United States on 2 November 1950, via Okinawa and Pearl Harbor. She arrived at Whidbey Island on 27 November 1950 and moved to San Diego on 1 December 1950.

Suisun deployed to the Far East again from 12 February 1951 to 6 August 1951 and yet again from 26 November 1951 to 25 May 1952. Her final Western Pacific tour during the Korean War was from 23 September 1952 to 21 May 1953. An Armistice Agreement ended the war in July 1953.

Suisun received two battle stars for her Korean War service.

== Operations in the Western Pacific 1953-1955 ==
Suisun conducted two more tours in the Western Pacific after the end of the Korean War, the first from 18 September 1953 to 17 March 1954 and the second from 2 July 1954 to 23 November 1954.

== Inactivation, decommissioning, and disposal ==
On 2 March 1955, Suisun reported to the Pacific Reserve Fleet for inactivation. She was placed in commission, in reserve, on 10 May 1955, and then was decommissioned and placed in reserve on 5 August 1955.

Suisun was stricken from the Naval Vessel Register on 1 April 1966. She was sunk as a target in October 1966.
