= USS San Carlos =

Tender of the United States Navy

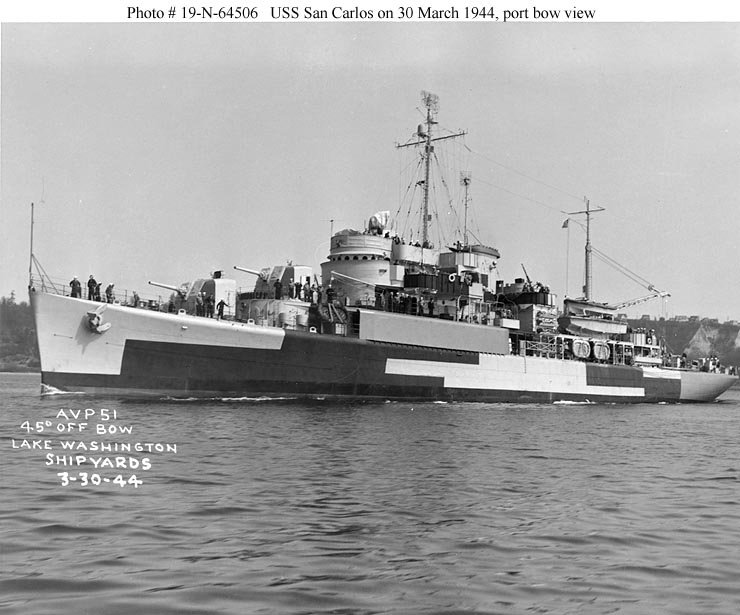
- USS San Carlos off Houghton, Washington, on 30 March 1944

History

United States
- Name: San Carlos
- Namesake: San Carlos Bay, Florida
- Builder: Lake Washington Shipyard, Houghton, Washington
- Laid down: 17 September 1942
- Launched: 20 December 1942
- Sponsored by: Mrs. Henry D. Batterton
- Commissioned: 21 March 1944
- Decommissioned: 30 June 1947
- Identification: AVP-51
- Honors and awards: Three battle stars for World War II service
- Name: Josiah Willard Gibbs
- Namesake: Josiah Willard Gibbs
- Builder: Lake Washington Shipyard, Houghton, Washington; Converted in 1958 by Mobile Ship Repair Company, Mobile, Alabama
- In service: 18 December 1958 with Military Sea Transportation Service
- Out of service: 7 December 1971
- Refit: As oceanographic research ship July–December 1958
- Stricken: 7 December 1971
- Identification: T-AGOR-1
- Fate: Transferred to Hellenic Navy, 15 December 1971

Greece
- Name: Hephaistos
- Acquired: 15 December 1971
- Stricken: April 1976
- Identification: A413

General characteristics (as seaplane tender)
- Class & type: Barnegat-class seaplane tender
- Displacement: 1,766 tons (light); 2,750 tons (full load)
- Length: 310 ft 9 in (94.72 m)
- Beam: 41 ft 2 in (12.55 m)
- Draft: 13 ft 6 in (4.11 m)
- Installed power: 6,000 hp (4,500 kW)
- Propulsion: Diesel engines, two shafts
- Speed: 18.6 knots (34.4 km/h)
- Complement: 215 (ship's company); 367 (including aviation unit)
- Sensors & processing systems: Radar; sonar
- Armament: 2 × 5 in (130 mm) guns; 2 × dual 20 mm antiaircraft guns; 4 × dual 20-millimeter antiaircraft guns; 2 × depth charge tracks
- Aviation facilities: Supplies, spare parts, repairs, and berthing for one seaplane squadron; 80,000 US gallons (300,000 L; 67,000 imp gal) aviation fuel

USS San Carlos (AVP-51) was a Barnegat-class seaplane tender built for the United States Navy during World War II. San Carlos, named after San Carlos Bay, Florida, was in commissioned from 1944 to 1947 and earned three battle stars for service in the Pacific during World War II. After eleven years in reserve, San Carlos was converted to oceanographic research ship USNS Josiah Willard Gibbs (T-AGOR-1)—named after American scientist Josiah Willard Gibbs—and placed in service as a non-commissioned ship of the Military Sea Transportation Service from 1958 to 1971. In December 1971, the ship was transferred to the Hellenic Navy as Hephaistos (A413), a motor torpedo boat tender. Hephaistos was struck from the rolls of the Hellenic Navy in April 1976.

== Service history ==
=== World War II: Seaplane tender ===
San Carlos was laid down on 17 September 1942 by Lake Washington Shipyard at Houghton, Washington. She was launched on 20 December 1942, sponsored by Mrs. Henry D. Batterton, and commissioned on 21 March 1944.

After shakedown, San Carlos departed Southern California on 1 June 1944. Arriving at Green Island on 25 June 1944, she engaged in air-sea rescue operations in the northern Solomon Islands from 26 June 1944 to 3 September 1944, and at Morotai Island, shortly after its capture from the Japanese, from 18 September 1944 to 30 September 1944.

Arriving off Leyte in the Philippine Islands on 18 October 1944 at the beginning of the Philippines campaign, San Carlos fueled battleship and cruiser observation floatplanes. She shot down one Japanese plane on 21 October 1944. Arriving at San Pedro Bay, Leyte, on 24 October 1944, she tended seaplanes there and downed another Japanese plane on 27 October 1944.

Departing on 4 November 1944, she made a cargo trip to Humboldt Bay, New Guinea, returning to San Pedro Bay on 18 November 1944. Arriving at San Juanico Strait on 22 November 1944, she shot down another Japanese plane on 26 November 1944 and tended seaplanes there until 22 January 1945. After duty at Mindoro Island in February 1945, she tended seaplanes near Cavite, on Luzon, from March 1945 until 11 August 1945.

San Carlos arrived at Bremerton, Washington, on 3 September 1945. After overhaul there, she operated out of Coco Solo, Panama Canal Zone, from December 1945 through May 1946, and out of San Juan, Puerto Rico, from July 1946 to March 1947. Decommissioned on 30 June 1947 at the Philadelphia Navy Yard at Philadelphia, Pennsylvania, San Carlos was laid up in the Atlantic Reserve Fleet. San Carlos received three battle stars for her World War II service.

=== Oceanographic research ship ===
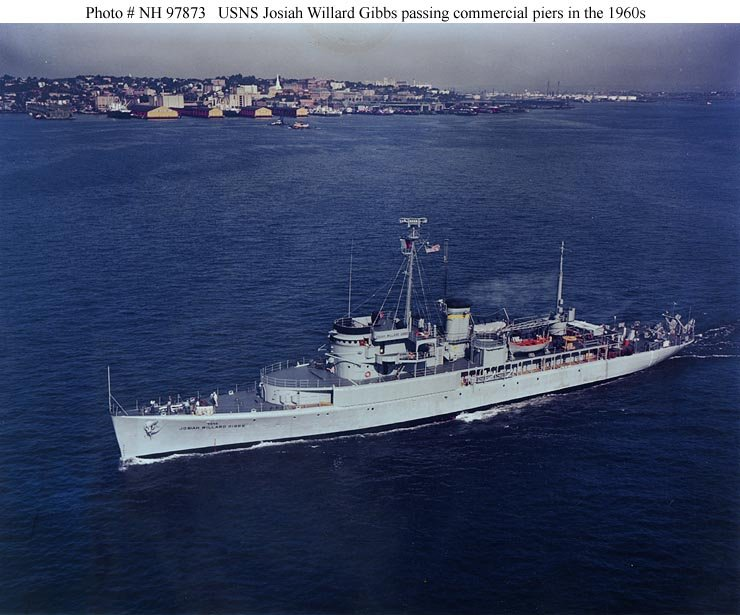
USNS Josiah Willard Gibbs in the 1960s.

After eleven years of inactivity, San Carlos was taken out of reserve on 11 July 1958 and assigned to the U.S. Navy's Military Sea Transportation Service for conversion to an oceanographic research ship by Mobile Ship Repair Company of Mobile, Alabama. Alterations to her original design included the installation of six laboratories, a machine shop, a darkroom, a superstructure deck locker for experimental stowage or work, and a deep-sea winch capable of handling up to 40,000 feet (12,000 m) of wire rope and 20 long tons (20 t) of equipment. In her modified form, she required a crew of 48 and could accommodate a scientific staff of 24.

On 15 December 1958, the ship was renamed USNS Josiah Willard Gibbs, in honor of American scientist Josiah Willard Gibbs and re-designated as an oceanographic research ship, T-AGOR-1. On 18 December 1958, she was placed in non-commissioned service as a United States Naval Ship under control of the Military Sea Transportation Service.

Josiah Willard Gibbs became the principal research vessel of the Hudson Laboratories of Columbia University, under contract to the Office of Naval Research. For thirteen years she provided transportation, accommodations, and working spaces for American scientists and technicians investigating physical, chemical, and biological properties of the ocean. She was dedicated primarily to research in the physics of the ocean, particularly the propagation of sound, as part of efforts by the Office of Naval Research to improve the U.S. Navy's submarine and anti-submarine warfare capabilities. Her relatively large size allowed her to handle heavier weights at greater depths and provide greater stability for delicate scientific measurements than any other oceanographic research vessel then in use. Her large deep-sea winch and auxiliary propeller gave her the capability to investigate even the deep ocean trenches scattered throughout the world.

In July 1968, Josiah Willard Gibbs surveyed a large fracture zone crossing the Mid-Atlantic Ridge at 52.624°N 33.198°W. This fracture zone was known at the time as Charlie Fracture Zone, after the United States Coast Guard's Ocean Weather Station Charlie at 52°45′N 35°30′W. It was proposed that the fracture zone be renamed Gibbs Fracture Zone after the ship, since fracture zones are generally named for research vessels. Currently this fracture zone is referred to as Charlie-Gibbs fracture zone. At 16°35′N 64°00′W in the Caribbean there is a seamount named Gibbs Seamount after the ship.

Josiah Willard Gibbs was taken out of service on 7 December 1971 and stricken from the Naval Vessel Register the same day.

=== Hellenic Navy career ===
Josiah Willard Gibbs was transferred to the Greek Navy on 15 December 1971. She then became the Greek motor torpedo boat tender Hephaistos (A413). She was stricken by the Greek Navy in April 1976.
