= Kamishak Bay =

Bay in Alaska, United States

Coordinates: 59°10′11″N 153°54′59″W

Kamishak Bay (Alutiiq: Qameksaq) is a bay on the coast of Alaska in the United States.

The proposed United States Navy seaplane tender USS Kamishak (AVP-44) was named for Kamishak Bay, but the contract for the ship's construction was cancelled in 1943 before construction began.
