= Lake Washington Shipyard =

American shipyard

Coordinates: 47°39′24″N 122°12′26″W

Lake Washington Shipyards was a shipyard in the northwest United States, located in Houghton, Washington (today Kirkland) on the shore of Lake Washington, east of Seattle. Today, the shipyards are the site of the lakeside Carillon Point business park. The shipyards built many civilian and U.S. Navy ships.

== History ==
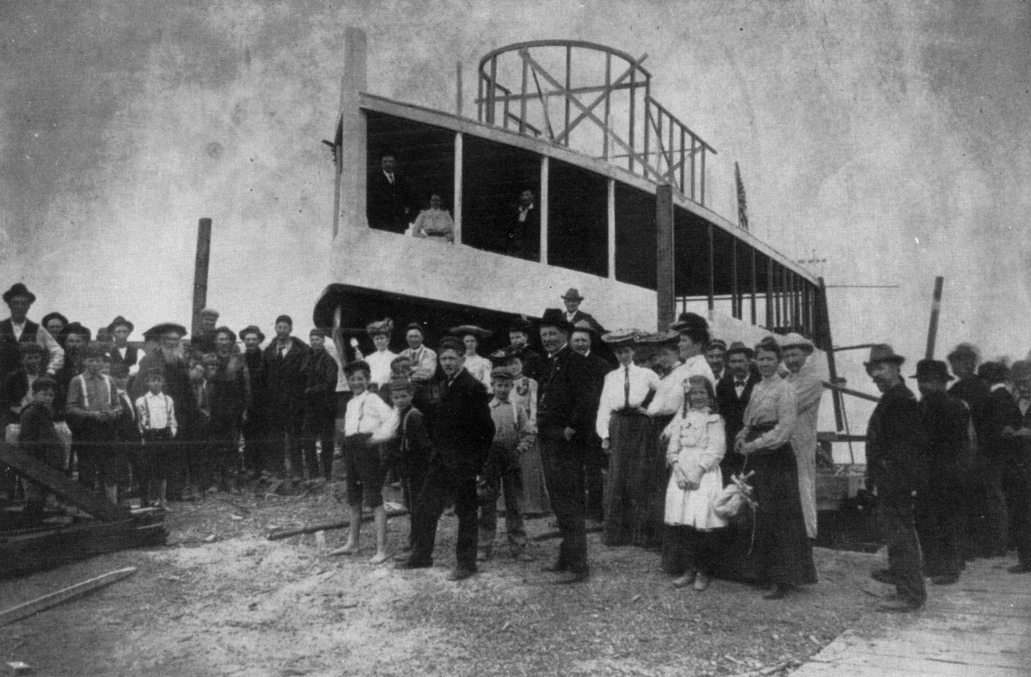
Anderson Shipyard circa 1900

Lake Washington Shipyard was founded in the 19th century as the Anderson Shipyard. This shipyard specialized in the construction of wooden tugs and ferries. In 1923, Anderson Shipyard was bought by Charles Burckardt and renamed Lake Washington Shipyards. The new shipyard converted to steel shipbuilding. During World War II, its workforce grew to 9,000 employees and it was a major repairer of small ships as well as a builder. After the war, the company stopped making new ships but continued to repair old ones until it finally closed in the 1960s. Today, the commercial/residential development at Carillon Point occupies the site of the former shipyard.

== Ships built here ==
Ships built at Lake Washington Shipyards include (with launch dates). Many of the US Navy's AVP-class seaplane tenders were transferred to the US Coast Guard after World War II and redeployed as High Endurance Cutters and Ocean Station vessels:

- Issaquah (ferry) 1914
- MV Kitsap 1925
- Bessie Mac - recreational vessel, delivered in 1926
- Seafarer - recreational vessel, delivered in 1926
- Dixie II - fishing vessel, delivered in 1927
- Caleb Haley - fishing vessel, delivered in 1928
- Bainbridge - ferry vessel for Puget Sound Navigation Company, delivered in 1928 (disposition: later Jervis Queen, barge 1967)
- M/V David B - delivered in 1929 (converted to passenger vessel in 2006)
- W.B.Foshay - ferry vessel for Puget Sound Navigation Company, delivered in 1929 (disposition: later Northland 1930, Ottar Jarl 1947, Titika 1955, wrecked 1955)
- Vashon - ferry vessel, delivered in 1930
- Tongass 100 - freight barge, delivered in 1930
- Victoria - recreational vessel, delivered in 1932
- MV Kalakala construction begins from burnt-out hull of Peralta in November 1934; maiden voyage July 3, 1935
- Robert Gray - tug for USACoE, delivered in 1936 (disposition: to USA as LT 666, returned as Robert Gray, sold, now research/cruise vessel)
- KW 252 - freight barge, delivered in 1940
- USS Pathfinder (AGS-1) keel laid 20 February 1941, launched 11 January 1942 and completed 31 August 1942 (USC&GSS: U.S. Coast and Geodetic Survey Ship)
- USC&GS Explorer (OSS 28) (1940)
- 4 of 32 Aloe-class net laying ships
  - USS Aloe (AN-6) (YN-1) (11 January 1941)
  - USS Ash (AN-7) (YN-2) (15 February 1941)
  - USS Boxwood (AN-8) (YN-3) (8 March 1941)
  - USS Butternut (YAG-60) (YN-4 / AN-9 / ANL-9 / YAG-60) (10 May 1941)
- 25 of 30 Barnegat-class seaplane tenders
  - USS Absecon (AVP-23) (8 March 1942)
  - USS Chincoteague (AVP-24) (15 April 1942)
  - USS Coos Bay (AVP-25) (15 May 1942)
  - USS Half Moon (AVP-26) (12 July 1942)
  - USS Mobjack AVP-27 / AGP-7 Seaplane Tender 1942
  - AVP-28 / AGP-6 Oyster Bay 1942
  - AVP-33 Barataria, WPG-381 / WAVP-381 / WHEC-381 Barataria 1943
  - USS Bering Strait (AVP-34) | USCGC Bering Strait (WAVP-382) 1944
  - USS Castle Rock (AVP-35) | USCGC Castle Rock (WAVP-383) | RVNS Trần Bình Trọng (HQ-05) | BRP Francisco Dagohoy (PF-10) 1944
  - USS Cook Inlet (AVP-36) (WAVP-384 / WHEC-384) 1944
  - USS Corson (AVP-37) 1944
  - USS Duxbury Bay (AVP-38) 1944
  - USS Gardiners Bay (AVP-39) 1944
  - USS Floyds Bay (AVP-40) 1945
  - USS Greenwich Bay (AVP-41) 1945
  - USS Hatteras (AVP-42) (cancelled 1943)
  - USS Hempstead (AVP-43) (cancelled 1943)
  - USS Kamishak (AVP-44) (cancelled 1943)
  - USS Magothy (AVP-45) (cancelled 1943)
  - USS Matanzas (AVP-46) (cancelled 1943)
  - USS Metomkin (AVP-47) (cancelled 1943)
  - USS Onslow (AVP-48) 1943
  - USS Orca (AVP-49) 1942
  - USS Rehoboth (AVP-50) 1942
  - USS San Carlos (AVP-51) / USNS Josiah Willard Gibbs (T-AGOR-1) 1941
  - USS Shelikof (AVP-52) 1943
  - USS Suisun (AVP-53) 1943
  - USS Timbalier (AVP-54) 1943
  - USS Valcour (AVP-55) 1943
  - USS Wachapreague (AGP-8) (AVP-56) (10 July 1943)
  - USS Willoughby (AGP-9) (AVP-57) (AGP-9) / USCGC Gresham (WAVP-387) (WHEC-387) (WAGW-387) 1943
- Delaware – trawler, delivered in 1956 (disposition: Later Angela, now Gimis B)
- Naknek – passenger vessel, delivered in 1966
- Joker – passenger vessel, delivered in 1967

== Seattle Seahawks ==
The expansion Seattle Seahawks of the National Football League were based at the southern end of the property for their first ten seasons (1976–1985).

== See also ==
- Category:Ships built at Lake Washington Shipyard
