= USS Biscayne =

Tender of the United States Navy

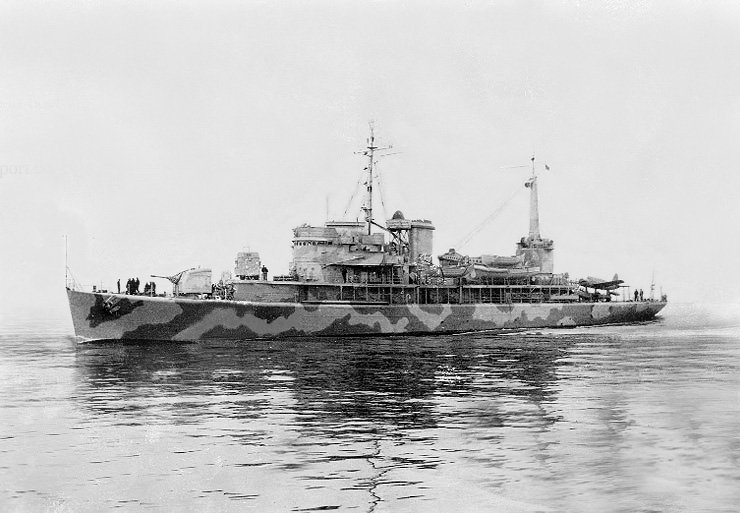
- USS Biscayne (AVP-11) on 29 January 1942

History

United States
- Name: USS Biscayne (AVP-11)
- Namesake: Biscayne Bay in Florida
- Builder: Puget Sound Navy Yard, Bremerton, Washington
- Laid down: 27 October 1939
- Launched: 23 May 1941
- Sponsored by: Mrs. A. M. Charleton
- Commissioned: 3 July 1941
- Decommissioned: 29 June 1946
- Reclassified: Amphibious command ship, AGC-18, 10 October 1944
- Honors and awards: Six battle stars for World War II service
- Fate: Transferred to U.S. Coast Guard 10 July 1946
- Acquired: Transferred from U.S. Coast Guard 9 July 1968
- Fate: Sunk as target 1968

United States
- Name: USCGC Dexter (WAGC-385)
- Namesake: Samuel Dexter (1761–1816), United States Secretary of the Treasury (1801)
- Acquired: By transfer from United States Navy on either 10 July 1946, 19 July 1946, or 29 July 1946
- Commissioned: 20 September 1946
- Decommissioned: 17 December 1952
- Recommissioned: 30 June 1958
- Decommissioned: 18 January 1968
- Reclassified: From WAGC-18 to WAVP-385 sometime between 1946 and 1952; High endurance cutter, WHEC-385, 1 May 1966
- Fate: Transferred to U.S. Navy 9 July 1968

General characteristics (seaplane tender)
- Class & type: Barnegat-class small seaplane tender
- Displacement: 1,766 tons (light); 2,750 tons (full load)
- Length: 310 ft 9 in (94.72 m)
- Beam: 41 ft 1 in (12.52 m)
- Draught: 13 ft 6 in (4.11 m)
- Installed power: 6,000 horsepower (4.48 megawatts)
- Propulsion: Diesel engines, two shafts
- Speed: 18.6 knots (34.4 km/h)
- Complement: 215 (ship's company); 367 (including aviation unit)
- Sensors & processing systems: Sonar
- Armament: As built: 2 x single 5 in (130 mm) 38-caliber dual-purpose gun mounts; Later: 1 × single 5-inch (127 mm) 38-caliber dual-purpose gun mount; 1 × quad 40-mm antiaircraft gun mount; 2 × dual 40-mm antiaircraft gun mounts; 4 × dual 20-mm antiaircraft gun mounts; 2 × depth charge tracks
- Aviation facilities: Supplies, spare parts, repairs, and berthing for one seaplane squadron; 80,000 US gallons (300,000 L) aviation fuel

General characteristics (Coast Guard cutter)
- Class & type: Casco-class cutter
- Displacement: 2,442 tons in 1965
- Length: 310 ft 9 in (94.72 m) overall; 300 ft 0 in (91.44 m) between perpendiculars
- Beam: 41 ft 0 in (12.50 m) maximum
- Draft: 12 ft 9 in (3.89 m) maximum in 1965
- Installed power: 6,150 bhp (4,590 kW)
- Propulsion: Fairbanks-Morse geared diesel engines, two shafts; 144,442 US gallons (546,770 L) of fuel
- Speed: 17.35 knots (32.13 km/h) (maximum sustained in 1965); 10.3 knots (19.1 km/h) (economic in 1965)
- Range: 8,680 nautical miles (16,080 km) at 17.35 knots (32.13 km/h) in 1965; 17,900 nautical miles (33,200 km) at 10.3 knots (19.1 km/h) in 1965
- Complement: 78 (10 officers, 2 warrant officers, 66 enlisted personnel) in 1965
- Sensors & processing systems: Radars in 1965: SPS-23, SPS-29D; Sonar in 1965: AN-UQN-1D
- Armament: In 1965: 1 x single 5-inch (127 mm) 38-caliber Mark 30 Mod 57 gun mount, 1 x Mark 52 Mod 2 director, 1 x Mark 26 Mod 3 fire-control radar

USS Biscayne (AVP-11), later AGC-18, was a United States Navy Barnegat-class seaplane tender in commission as a seaplane tender from 1941 to 1943 and as an amphibious force flagship from 1943 to 1946. She saw service during World War II. Transferred to the United States Coast Guard after the war, she was in commission as the Coast Guard cutter USCGC Dexter (WAGC-385), later WAVP-385 and WHEC-385, from 1946 to 1952 and from 1958 to 1968.

== Construction and commissioning ==
Biscayne was laid down on 27 October 1939 at Puget Sound Navy Yard in Bremerton, Washington. She was launched on 23 May 1941, sponsored by Mrs. A. M. Charleton, and commissioned on 3 July 1941.

== United States Navy service ==
=== World War II ===
==== Seaplane tender operations ====
Following her shakedown cruise, Biscayne joined the Atlantic Fleet and operated out of Boston, Massachusetts, on patrol and plane guard missions from 7 December 1941 until 27 May 1942. For the next four months she served as a seaplane tender and communications ship in Newfoundland and Greenland waters.

Biscayne departed Norfolk, Virginia, on 17 October 1942 and, after a short stop at Guantanamo Bay, Cuba, moved to Freetown, Sierra Leone, with Patrol Squadron 92 (VP-92), arriving on 2 November 1942.

Biscayne moved to Casablanca, French Morocco, on 18 November 1942 and remained there until 25 April 1943 supporting patrol squadrons.

==== Amphibious force flagship operations in the Mediterranean ====
Biscayne arrived at Mers-el-Kebir, Algeria, on 26 April 1943 and became the flagship of Rear Admiral Richard Lansing Conolly, Commander, Landing Craft and Bases, Northwest African Waters. While at Mers-el-Kebir she was fitted out as an amphibious force flagship by repair ship USS Delta (AR-9) between 2 and 31 May 1943, although she retained her seaplane tender classification and AVP-11 designation for the time being. In May 1943, Biscayne shifted her moorings to Bizerte, Tunisia.

Departing Bizerte on 10 July 1943, Biscayne served as flagship of the Joss (Licata) Force in Operation Husky, the Allied invasion of Sicily. She remained off Sicily until 22 July 1943 and then returned to Bizerte.

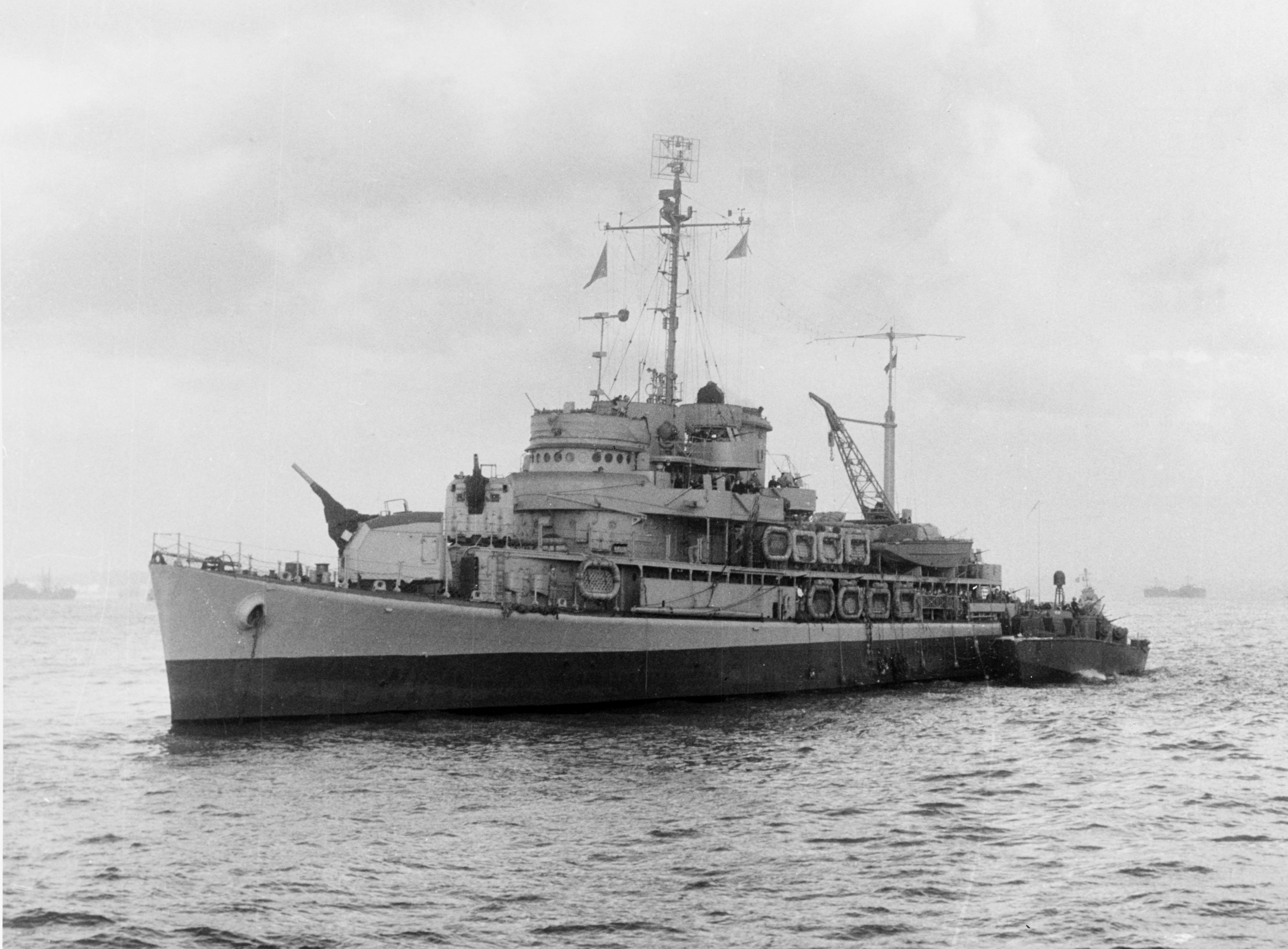
Biscayne as an amphibious force flagship off Anzio on 21 January 1944 or 22 January 1944 during Operation Shingle. A PT boat is alongside her.

Beginning on 9 September 1943, Biscayne took part in Operation Avalanche, the Allied landings at Salerno, Italy, as flagship for Vice Admiral H. Kent Hewitt and Rear Admiral Conolly. On board the ship during the Anzio invasion was famed journalist Ernie Pyle. According to Lt. Earl V. Avery, Admiral Connolly was nicknamed "too close Connolly" by the crew. One time the admiral wanted to get a closer look at the beach at night and search lights lit them up "like a Christmas tree", according to Avery. Pyle wrote in his book that a young naval Lieutenant (Avery) remarked "Oh my God, my kids will be orphans." However, one by one the lights were turned off. They guessed they were Italian and didn't want to draw their fire. While off Salerno, she escaped unscathed from frequent air and gunfire attacks. On 12 September 1943, she sent a fire and rescue team on board the British ammunition ship Lyminge and saved that vessel and her cargo of ammunition from destruction. Biscayne also served as a temporary hospital ship while off Salerno. Biscayne retired to Bizerte on 11 October 1943.

On 7 November 1943, Biscayne became the flagship of Rear Admiral F. J. Lowry, Commander, 8th Amphibious Force. Sailing for Italy once again, she served as flagship during Operation Shingle, the Allied landings at Anzio, from 22 January 1944 to 2 February 1944.

Biscayne became the flagship of Rear Admiral B. J. Rodgers, Commander, Amphibious Group 2, 8th Amphibious Force, in May 1944. Between 15 August 1944 and 16 September 1944, she took part in Operation Dragoon, the Allied invasion of southern France.

On 10 October 1944, Biscayne was officially reclassified as a miscellaneous flagship and redesignated AGC-18.

==== Amphibious force flagship operations in the Pacific Theater ====
Biscayne left the Mediterranean on 12 October 1944 bound for Boston, and then steamed to the Pacific Ocean. She arrived at Pearl Harbor, Hawaii, on 9 January 1945 and became flagship of Captain Frederick Moosbrugger, Commander, Destroyer Squadron 63.

Biscayne took part in the invasion of Iwo Jima from 19 February 1945 to 4 March 1945 as flagship of the transport screen. she carried out similar duties during Operation Iceberg, the landings on Kerama Retto on 26 March 1945 and on Okinawa on 1 April 1945. She remained off Okinawa, supporting U.S. operations during and after the Okinawa campaign, until 1 July 1945, during which time she served as flagship for the occupation of Iheya and Aguni Islands between 3 June 1945 and 9 June 1945.

After her tour at Okinawa, Biscayne retired to Leyte in the Philippine Islands, and remained in the Philippines through the end of World War II, which concluded with the cessation of hostilities with Japan on 15 August 1945.

==== Honors and awards ====
Biscayne received six battle stars for her World War II service.

23 June 1950 From: Chief of Naval Personnel Addressed to all personnel/sailors Subject: Navy Unit Commendation Ribbon Bar The Secretary of the Navy has awarded the U.S.S. Biscayne the Navy Unit Commendation for meritorious service in action against enemy aircraft, shore batteries, surface forces and mines in both the European and Pacific Theaters of Operation.

=== Post-World War II ===
Biscayne departed the Philippines on 8 September 1945 to support the occupation of Korea. She remained on occupation duty in Korean and Chinese waters until 30 October 1945, when she left for the United States.

Biscayne arrived at San Diego, California, on 21 December 1945 and at Portland, Maine, on 7 January 1946. She then moved to the United States Naval Academy at Annapolis, Maryland, for use as quarters for the academy's aviation instruction staff.

=== Decommissioning ===
Biscayne was decommissioned on 29 June 1946.

== United States Coast Guard service ==
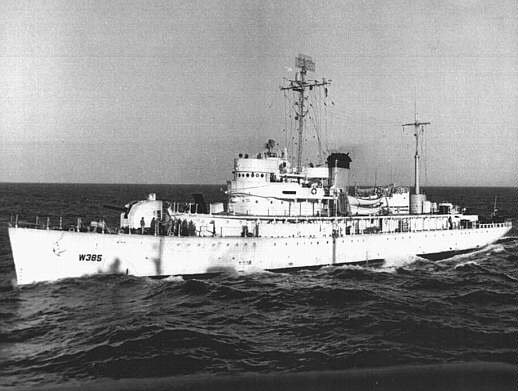
USCGC Dexter (WAGC-18, WAVP-385, WHEC-385) sometime between her commissioning in 1946 and the Coast Guard's 1967 adoption of the "racing stripe" markings on its ships.

Barnegat-class ships were very reliable and seaworthy and had good habitability, and the United States Coast Guard viewed them as ideal for ocean station duty, in which they would perform weather reporting and search-and-rescue tasks, once they were modified by having a balloon shelter added aft and having oceanographic equipment, an oceanographic winch, and a hydrographic winch installed. After World War II, the Navy transferred 18 of the ships to the Coast Guard, in which they were known as the Casco-class cutters.

The Navy transferred Biscayne to the Coast Guard on either 10 July 1946, 19 July 1946, or 29 July 1946. at the Coast Guard Yard at Curtis Bay at Baltimore, Maryland. After she underwent conversion for service as a weather reporting ship, the Coast Guard commissioned her as USCGC Dexter (WAGC-18) – the fourth ship of the U.S. Coast Guard or its predecessor, the United States Revenue Cutter Service, to bear the name – on 20 September 1946.

=== Atlantic service 1946–1952 ===
Dexter was stationed at Boston, Massachusetts, which would remain her home port until December 1952, and was redesignated WAVP-385 at some point during her time there. Her primary duty was to serve on ocean stations in the Atlantic Ocean to gather meteorological data. While on duty in one of these stations, she was required to patrol a 210-square-mile (544-square-kilometer) area for three weeks at a time, leaving the area only when physically relieved by another Coast Guard cutter or in the case of a dire emergency. While on station, she acted as an aircraft check point at the point of no return, a relay point for messages from ships and aircraft, as a source of the latest weather information for passing aircraft, as a floating oceanographic laboratory, and as a search-and-rescue ship for downed aircraft and vessels in distress, and engaged in law enforcement operations. She arrived at Boston to assume her duties on 17 October 1946.

On 30 November 1946, Dexter was at Naval Station Argentia, Newfoundland, Canada, underway to her first ocean station duty at Ocean Station Charlie. By 28 December 1946 she was back in Boston. For the next few months, she was on Ocean Station Charlie and Ocean Station Alfa, taking time out in October 1947 for underway training near Berkley Station at Norfolk, Virginia.

Dexter served on Ocean Station Able from 30 October 1947 to 10 December 1947. While on that duty, she responded to a request for assistance by the merchant ship SS Louisburg, which was flooding, on 4 November 1947. Dexter transferred a life raft and damage control timbers to Louisburg and escorted her safely to St. John's, Newfoundland. Dexter then returned to Ocean Station Able.

On 4 November 1948, while underway from Ocean Station Alfa, Dexter assisted the fishing vessel Pan Pades Andros, which was disabled about 30 nautical miles (56 km) southeast of Sable Island. Following this assistance case, Dexter was put into repair status until 12 February 1949, when repairs were completed and she was in port on standby.

On 14 February 1949, Dexter relieved the Coast Guard cutter USCGC Winnebago (WPG-40) from duty on Ocean Station Delta, and in turn was relieved by the Coast Guard cutter USCGC Androscoggin (WPG-68). On 27 April 1949 she relieved the Coast Guard cutter USCGC Ingham (WPG-35) on Ocean Station Echo and on 29 April 1949 was underway to Bermuda with an injured crew member. She resumed station on 3 May 1949. On 21 May 1949 she assisted the fishing vessel Sea Hawk and on 22 May 1949 turned Sea Hawk over to the Coast Guard cutter USCGC Legare (WSC-144) for further assistance. She then returned to Boston for repairs.

On 30 July 1949, Dexter assisted the U.S. Navy destroyer USS Livermore while at sea. On 9 September 1949, she was forced to proceed south of Sable Island to avoid the center of a hurricane. She proceeded on to Ocean Station Bravo and relieved Coast Guard cutter USCGC Humboldt (WAVP-372) on 12 September 1949. On 30 September 1949, she was relieved on Ocean Station Bravo by the Canadian Coast Guard ship CGS St. Stephen. In October 1949, she participated in gunnery exercises in the Newport, Rhode Island, area.

For the next few months, Dexter had her regular ocean station patrols with nothing unusual happening until 7 August 1950, when she went off Ocean Station Charlie temporarily to assist the merchant ship SS Belfrey, and proceeded to escort her toward St. John's, Newfoundland, until 11 August 1950, when she was relieved of the escort duty by Coast Guard cutter USCGC Spencer (WPG-36) and returned to Ocean Station Charlie. On 26 November 1950 she assisted U.S. Navy destroyer escort USS Tweedy, which was adrift off Cape Cod, Massachusetts.

On 2 January 1951 Dexter departed Boston en route Ocean Station Hotel. In April 1951 she was temporarily off Ocean Station Echo for two days, while investigating a reported depth charge in the area. On 11 June 1951 she temporarily departed Ocean Station Delta on a distress-response mission and reoccupied the station on 14 June 1951. During November 1951, she was forced to leave Ocean Station Alfa for a short while due to an urgent medical case.

On 19 February 1952, Dexter left Ocean Station Hotel to assist the merchant ship SS Helen Stevenson, which had cracked across the main deck port and starboard at the hatch. She escorted Helen Stevenson to a point less than 10 nautical miles (18.5 kilometers) east of St. George's, Bermuda, and then returned to station. On 18 October 1952, she departed Ocean Station Alfa and proceeded to Boston. On 8 November 1952, she departed Boston for the Coast Guard Yard at Curtis Bay, Maryland, arriving there on 9 November 1952.

On 17 December 1952, Dexter was decommissioned at the Coast Guard Yard and placed in storage there. In 1957 she was re-engined with four new Fairbanks Morse diesel engines.

=== Pacific service 1958–1968 ===
Dexter was recommissioned on 30 June 1958 and assigned to a new home port, Alameda, California. She departed Curtis Bay on 14 July 1958 under the command of Commander Bainbridge Leland, USCG.

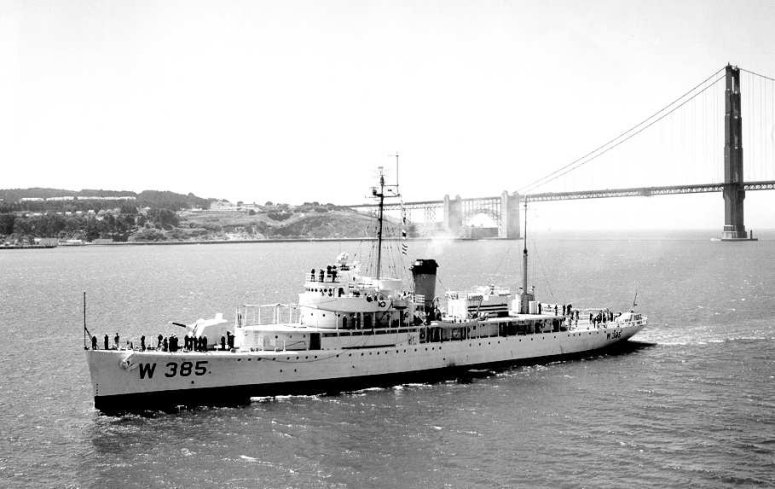
USCGC Dexter (WAVP-385) arriving in San Francisco Bay on 11 August 1958 en route her new home port at Alameda, California.

Dexter arrived at Alameda on 11 August 1958. She assumed duty as the United States West Coast training ship for the United States Coast Guard Reserve training component. She provided training at sea for Coast Guard Reserve recruits undergoing training at Alameda Training Station. Crewed by a complement of 83—eight officers, 10 chief petty officers, and 65 other enlisted sailors—to 85, Dexter had facilities for handling over 100 recruits at a time. Recruits spent approximately three months aboard Dexter for indoctrination and one extended cruise beyond the waters of San Francisco Bay. Dexter also made cruises to various ports on the U.S. West Coast, as well as to British Columbia in Canada, Hawaii, Alaska, and Mexico, in connection with training activities.

Dexter also participated as a search-and-rescue patrol vessel for various sailing races and regattas, including the September 1958 America's Cup Race at Newport, Rhode Island, and the Transpacific Yacht Races from Los Angeles, California, to Honolulu, Hawaii, of 1959, 1961, and 1965.

Dexter also conducted search and rescue operations. On 18 July 1959, she towed the disabled fishing vessel Cloud Nine until relieved by the Coast Guard buoy tender USCGC Blackhaw (WLB-390). On 5 February 1965, she unsuccessfully searched for an F-4B Phantom jet fighter aircraft near San Clemente Island. In early February 1966, she towed the disabled sloop Allegro from 360 nautical miles (670 km) south-southwest of San Diego, California, to Asuncion Bay.

Dexter was reclassified as a high endurance cutter and redesignated WHEC-385 on 1 May 1966.

=== Decommissioning and disposal ===
On 18 January 1968, the Coast Guard decommissioned Dexter. She was transferred to the U.S. Navy on 9 July 1968 and sunk as a target later that year.
