= USS Shelikof =

Tender of the United States Navy

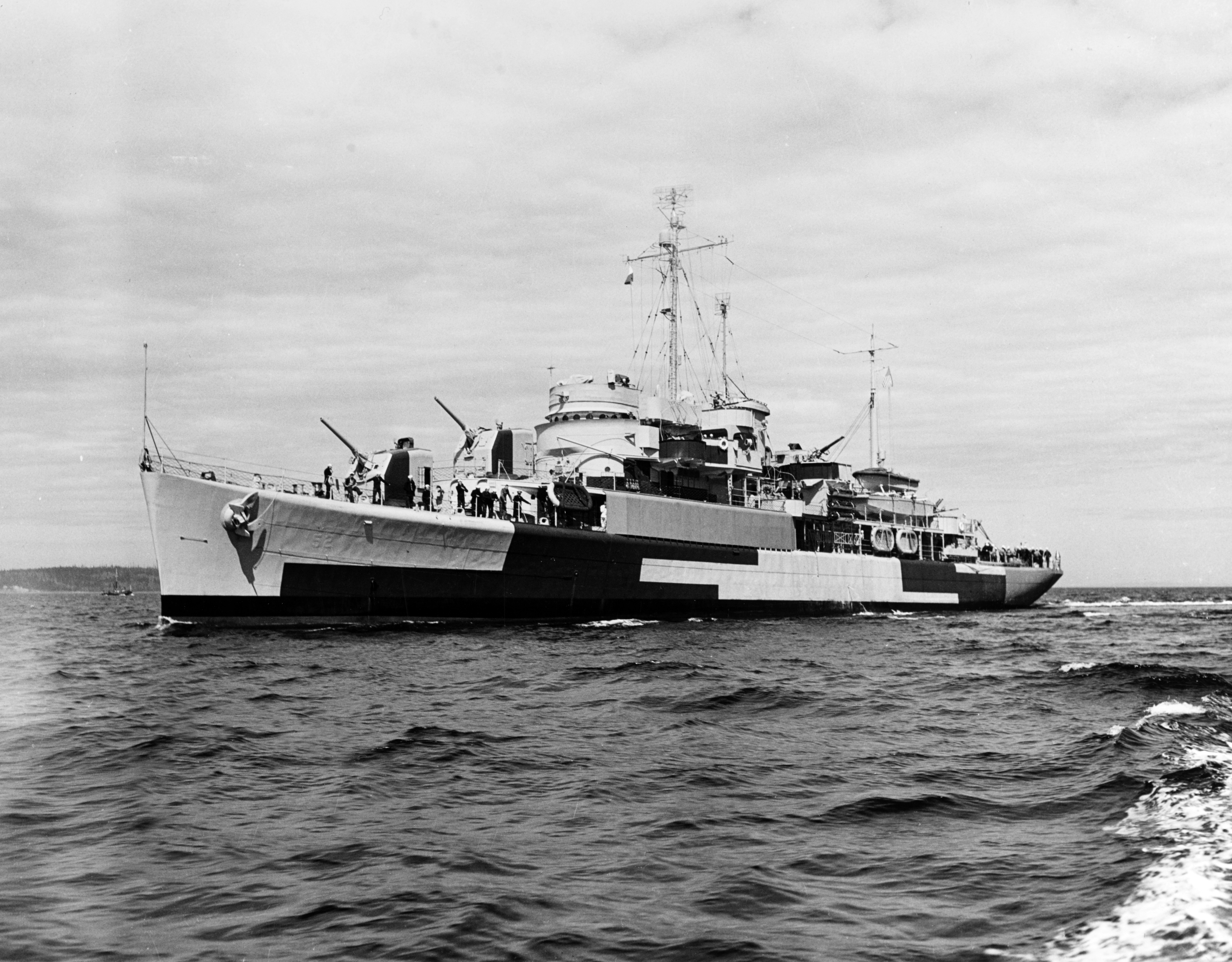
- USS Shelikof (AVP-52) off Houghton, Washington, on 26 April 1944

History

United States
- Name: USS Shelikof
- Namesake: Shelikof Strait on the west coast of Alaska
- Laid down: 20 September 1942
- Launched: 31 January 1943
- Sponsored by: Mrs. F. D. Wagner
- Commissioned: 7 April 1944
- Decommissioned: 30 June 1947
- Recommissioned: 3 January 1952
- Decommissioned: December 1954
- Stricken: 1 May 1960
- Identification: IMO number: 5199935
- Honors and awards: Three battle stars for World War II service
- Fate: Sold 20 December 1960
- Notes: Served as commercial Greek passenger ship 1961-1981, named MV Kypros 1961-1964, MV Myconos 1964-1973, MV Artemis 1973-1974, MV Artemis K 1974-1979, and MV Golden Princess 1979-1981; Sank in storm while laid up January 1981

General characteristics
- Class & type: Barnegat-class seaplane tender
- Displacement: 1,766 tons (light); 2,750 tons (full load)
- Length: 311 ft 8 in (95.00 m)
- Beam: 41 ft 1 in (12.52 m)
- Draught: 13 ft 6 in (4.11 m)
- Installed power: 6,000 horsepower (4.48 megawatts)
- Propulsion: Diesel engines, two shafts
- Speed: 18.6 knots (34.4 km/h)
- Complement: 215 (ship's company); 367 (including aviation unit)
- Armament: 1 × 5 in (130 mm) guns; 9 × 40 mm antiaircraft guns; 2 × depth charge tracks
- Aviation facilities: Supplies, spare parts, repairs, and berthing for one seaplane squadron; 80,000 US gallons (300,000 L) aviation fuel

USS Shelikof (AVP-52) was a United States Navy Barnegat-class small seaplane tender in commission from 1944 to 1947 and from 1952 to 1954.

== Construction, commissioning, and shakedown ==
Shelikof was laid down on 20 September 1942 by Lake Washington Shipyard at Houghton, Washington. She was launched on 31 January 1943, sponsored by Mrs. F. D. Wagner, and commissioned on 17 April 1944.

Upon completion of fitting out, Shelikof departed for Alameda, California, on 8 May 1944 and loaded aircraft spares. She then moved to San Diego, for shakedown and to San Pedro, California, for a yard period.

== World War II operations 1944-1945 ==
=== Eniwetok ===
On 30 June 1944, Shelikof departed San Pedro for Pearl Harbor, Hawaii. On 9 July 1944, she was underway from Pearl Harbor with a convoy bound for Eniwetok. While at Eniwetok from 18 July to 1 August, Shelikof had her aviation machine shop and carpenter shop converted into combination aircraft and aircraft radar maintenance facilities.

=== The Mariana Islands and Ulithi Atoll ===
Shelikof's next port of call was Tanapag Harbor, a former Japanese seaplane base on Saipan. Her personnel went ashore daily to clear debris from the hangars and the surrounding area in order to make the base operable, thereby relieving the congestion at aircraft tenders. When Shelikof departed on 3 December 1944, Naval Air Base Saipan, was being used as a supply depot and a major overhaul facility.

Shelikof spent the next three months shuttling spare parts and supplies between Guam, Ulithi Atoll, and Saipan.

=== Supporting the Okinawa invasion ===
Shelikof sailed from Saipan with Task Unit 51.20 on 23 March 1945 for the invasion of the Ryukyu Islands. The seaplane group moved into the anchorage at Kerama Retto on 28 March 1945 as United States Army units were still battling to secure those small rocky islands before the major assault on Okinawa began on 1 April 1945. Shelikof laid eight seaplane mooring buoys on 28 March 1945 and three of them were put into use on 29 March 1945 when the first Martin PBM-5 Mariner flying boats arrived. The anchorage was under constant Japanese air attack during April 1945, but the only casualties aboard Shelikof occurred on 28 April 1945 when friendly fire wounded two men. On 6 May 1945, Shelikof took under fire a Japanese plane which approached within 1,000 yards (915 m), 50 feet (15 m) off the water, but no damage to the plane was noted.

The seaplane base was shifted to Chimu Wan, Okinawa, on 15 July 1945 and Shelikof operated there until the end of hostilities with Japan on 15 August 1945, which brought World War II to a close.

=== Honors and awards ===
Shelikof earned three battle stars for her World War II service.

== Peacetime service 1945-1947 ==
After the end of the war, Shelikof shuttled between Okinawa and ports in Japan until departing for the United States on 25 October 1945. En route she made port at Midway Atoll; Pearl Harbor; San Diego; Acapulco, Mexico; and Coco Solo, Panama Canal Zone, before arriving at Norfolk, Virginia, on 4 December 1945.

After an overhaul, Shelikof departed Norfolk on 12 March 1946 for the Azores. Back in Norfolk on 30 March 1946, she made four voyages to San Juan, Puerto Rico, and two to Trinidad by 11 June 1946. By 14 June 1946, she was at Coco Solo, and she operated from there until 16 March 1947, when she sailed to Philadelphia, Pennsylvania, for inactivation. Shelikof was decommissioned on 30 June 1947 and laid up in reserve in the Atlantic Reserve Fleet.

== Second period in commission 1952-1954 ==
Shelikof was recommissioned at Philadelphia on 3 January 1952. She operated along the United States East Coast from her home port at Norfolk for the next two and a half years.

Shelikof commenced inactivation in July 1954. She was placed out of commission in reserve in the Texas Group of the Atlantic Reserve Fleet at Orange, Texas, in December 1954.

== Final decommissioning and disposal ==
Shelikof was stricken from the Naval Vessel Register on 1 May 1960. She was sold on 20 December 1960 to Panagiotis Kokkinos of Piraeus, Greece.

== Greek commercial service ==
Shelikof was converted for commercial service as the Greek passenger ship MV Kypros. She subsequently was renamed MV Myconos in 1964, MV Artemis in 1973, MV Artemis K in 1974, and MV Golden Princess in 1979.

Golden Princess sank in a storm at Perama, Greece, while laid up in January 1981.

== Sources ==
- Department of the Navy Naval Historical Center Online Library of Selected Images: U.S. Navy Ships: USS Shelikof (AVP-52), 1944-1960
- Photo gallery of USS Shelikof at NavSource Naval History
- Chesneau, Roger. Conway's All the World's Fighting Ships 1922–1946. New York: Mayflower Books, Inc., 1980. ISBN 0-8317-0303-2.
