= Shelikof Strait =

Alaskan strait

Coordinates: 57°52′54″N 154°25′31″W

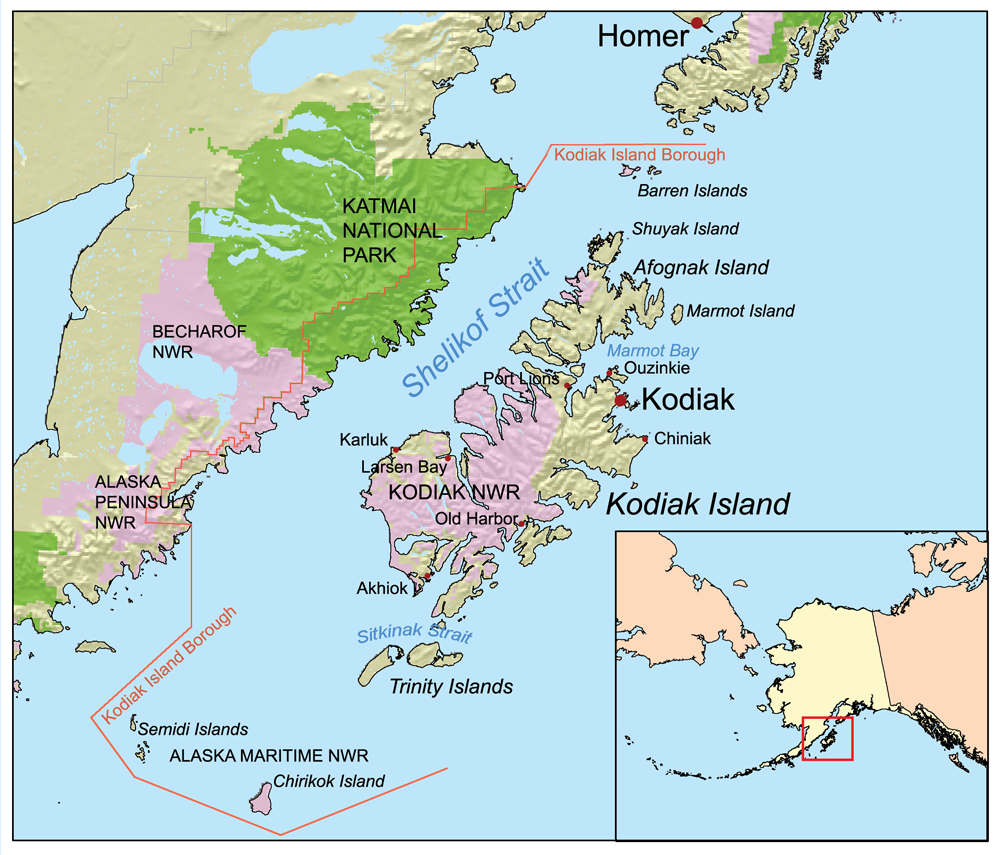

The Shelikof Strait (Russian: Пролив Шелихова, romanized: Proliv Shelikhova) is a strait on the southwestern coast of the U.S. state of Alaska between the Alaska mainland to the west and Kodiak and Afognak islands to the east.

The Strait separates the mainland coastal strip of the Kodiak Island Borough from its Kodiak Island portion and is about 150 statute miles (240 kilometers) long and 25 to 30 statute miles (40 to 48 kilometers) wide. Cook Inlet is at its northern end. The strait is well known for its extreme tidal flow due to its close proximity to Cook Inlet, which can have maximum tidal variances of up to 40 feet (12 meters).

The strait is named after Grigory Shelikhov (1747–1795), also spelled "Shelikof", the Russian fur trader who founded the first Russian settlement in what is now Alaska at Three Saints Bay on Kodiak Island in 1784.

The United States Navy seaplane tender USS Shelikof, in commission from 1944 to 1947 and from 1952 to 1954, was named for Shelikof Strait.
