= Houghton, Washington =

- Neighborhood
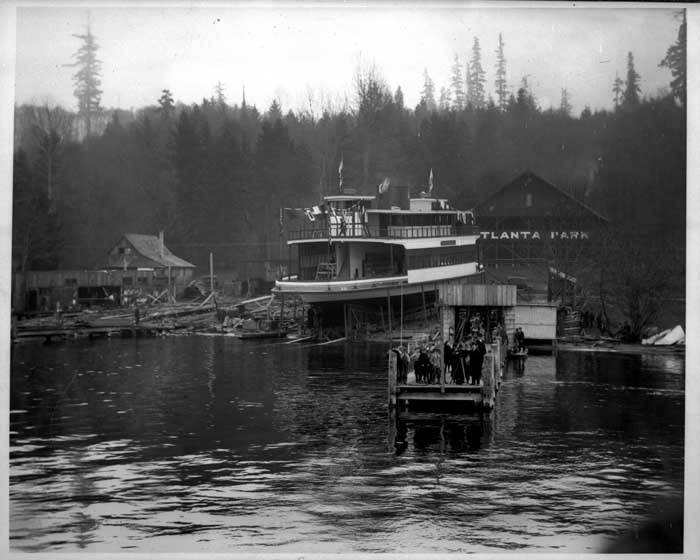
- Launch of the Anderson Steamboat Company ferry Issaquah, Houghton, 1914
- Interactive map of Houghton, Washington
- Coordinates: 47°39′39″N 122°12′21″W
- Country: United States
- State: Washington
- County: King
- Time zone: UTC-8 (Pacific (PST))
  - Summer (DST): UTC-7 (PDT)

Houghton /ˈhoʊtən/ is one of the lakeside neighborhoods of the city of Kirkland, Washington. Consisting mostly of upscale, single-family homes, Houghton overlooks Lake Washington and is one of the wealthier districts of the Eastside suburbs of Seattle. The village was named for Willard Houghton, a local lumberman. Houghton incorporated in 1948. In 1950, Census records showed there were 1,065 people living in the town of Houghton. The city of Houghton was annexed by Kirkland in 1968 and became the first community in Washington with a neighborhood council.

The headquarters of the Seattle Seahawks were located in Houghton, near Northwest University until moving to new quarters in Renton in 2008. The main arterials running through Houghton include 108th Avenue NE, west of Interstate 405, Lakeview Drive, and Lake Street, which connects to Lake Washington Boulevard NE.

Attractions include Houghton Beach Park and Marsh Park, on the lake, and Watershed Park, adjacent to the interstate.

== Houghton Shipyard ==
In earlier times, Houghton was home to a large shipbuilding operation, the Lake Washington Shipyards (a U.S. Navy contractor) previously named the Anderson Steamboat Company. It is located directly across the lake from Sand Point Naval Air Station, which was decommissioned in the 1970s. At one time there was a dock providing access to the Lake Washington ferries.

Stewart Heights was a residential area just east of the Burlington Northern tracks on the grounds of what became Northwest University. Many workers for the shipyards near Houghton lived there.

Today the shipyards are the site of the lakeside Carillon Point business park.
