= Unimak =

Unimak may refer to:

- Unimak Island, the largest of the Aleutian Islands
- Unimak Bay on the coast of Unimak Island
- Unimak Pass, a passage between the Bering Sea and North Pacific Ocean
- USS Unimak (AVP-31), a United States Navy seaplane tender
- USCGC Unimak (WAVP-379), a United States Coast Guard cutter
