= Cook Inlet (disambiguation) =

Cook Inlet is an inlet in Alaska.

Cook Inlet may also refer to:

- Cook Inlet Region, Inc., an Alaska Native regional corporation
- USS Cook Inlet (AVP-36), a United States Navy seaplane tender in commission from 1944 to 1946
- USCGC Cook Inlet (WAVP-384), later WHEC-384, a United States Coast Guard cutter in commission from 1949 to 1971
- Cook Inlet beluga whale, a type of Beluga (whale)
- The Cook Inlet Basin

== See also ==
- Knik Arm ferry or Cook Inlet ferry, a proposed year-round passenger and auto ferry across Knik Arm between Anchorage and Point MacKenzie in Alaska
