= USS Unimak =

Barnegat-class small seaplane tender

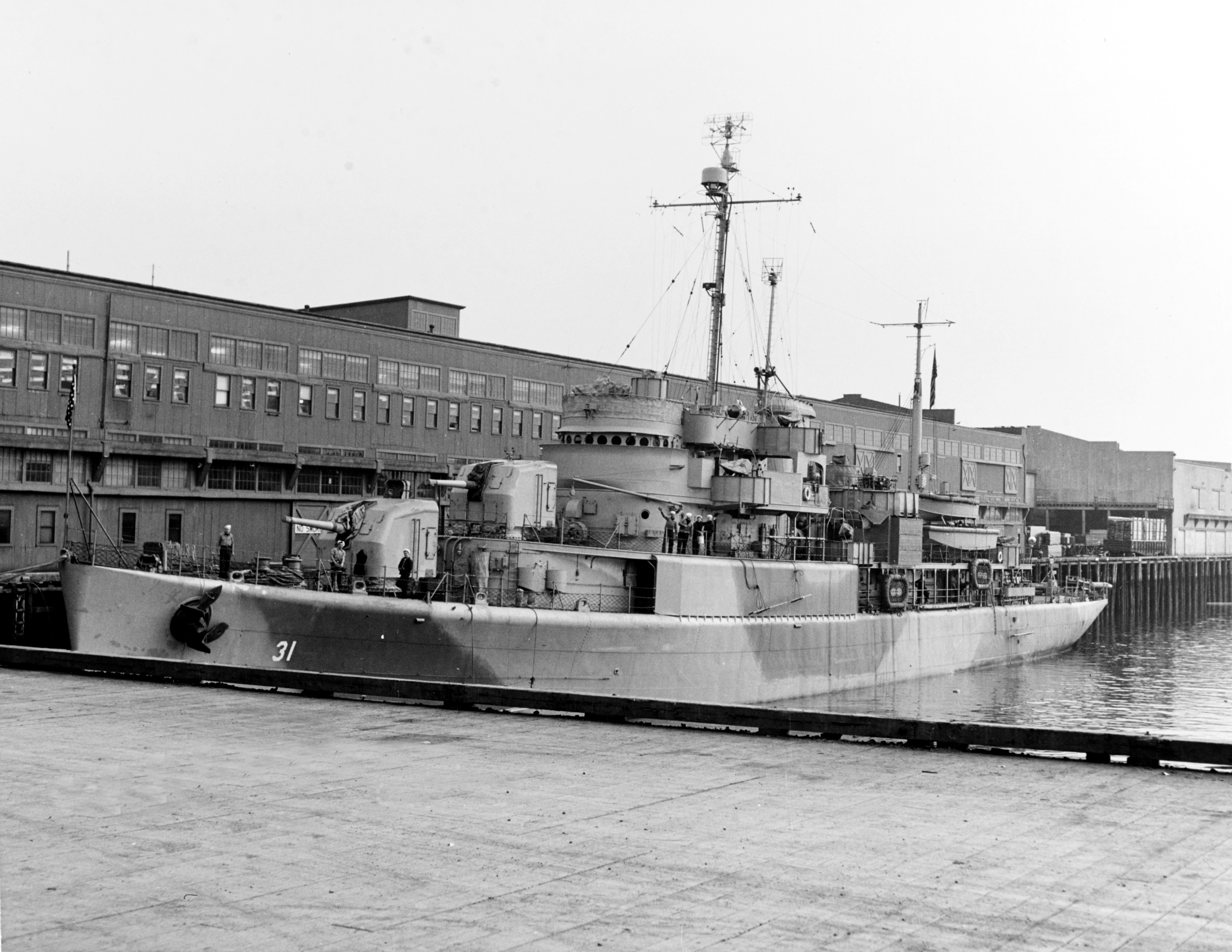
- USS Unimak (AVP-31) in Seattle on 31 January 1944

History

United States
- Name: USS Unimak (AVP-31)
- Namesake: Unimak Bay on the southern side of Unimak Island, Alaska
- Builder: Associated Shipbuilders, Inc., Seattle
- Laid down: 15 February 1942
- Launched: 27 May 1942
- Sponsored by: Mrs. H. B. Berry
- Commissioned: 31 December 1943
- Decommissioned: 25 January 1946
- Fate: Lent to U.S. Coast Guard 14 September 1948; Transferred to Coast Guard 26 September 1966
- Acquired: Transferred from U.S. Coast Guard 1988
- Fate: Scuttled 1988 to form an artificial reef

United States
- Name: USCGC Unimak (WAVP-379)
- Namesake: Unimak Bay on the coast of Unimak Island in Alaska (previous name retained)
- Acquired: Loaned by U.S. Navy 14 September 1948; Transferred from Navy to Coast Guard 26 September 1966
- Commissioned: 3 January 1949
- Reclassified: High endurance cutter, WHEC-379, 1 May 1966; Training ship, WTR-379, 28 November 1969
- Decommissioned: 31 May 1975
- Recommissioned: 22 August 1977
- Reclassified: High endurance cutter, WHEC-379, 22 August 1977
- Decommissioned: 29 April 1988
- Fate: Transferred to U.S. Navy 1988
- Notes: Radio callsign NBVG

General characteristics (seaplane tender)
- Class & type: Barnegat-class small seaplane tender
- Displacement: 1,766 tons (light); 2,592 tons (full load)
- Length: 310 ft 9 in (94.7 m)
- Beam: 41 ft 2 in (12.55 m)
- Draft: 13 ft 6 in (4.1 m)
- Installed power: 6,000 horsepower (4.48 megawatts)
- Propulsion: Diesel engines, two shafts
- Speed: 18.2 knots (33.7 km/h)
- Complement: 215 (ship's company); 367 (with aviation unit)
- Sensors & processing systems: Radar; sonar
- Armament: 2 × 5-inch (127 mm) 38-caliber guns; 4 × 40 mm antiaircraft guns; 8 × 20 mm antiaircraft guns; 2 × depth charge tracks; 2 × Mousetrap depth charge projectors
- Aviation facilities: Supplies, spare parts, repairs, and berthing for one seaplane squadron; 80,000 US gallons (300,000 L) aviation fuel

General characteristics (Coast Guard cutter)
- Class & type: Casco-class cutter
- Displacement: 2,498 long tons (2,538 t) full load in 1966
- Length: 311 ft 7¾ in (95.0 m) overall; 300 ft 0 in (91.4 m) between perpendiculars
- Beam: 41 ft (12.5 m) maximum
- Draft: 12 ft 7 in (3.8 m) full load, aft, maximum, in 1966
- Installed power: 6,080 bhp (4,530 kW)
- Propulsion: Four Fairbanks-Morse 10-cylinder direct-reversing diesel engines in two engine rooms; two shafts
- Speed: 17.3 knots (32 km/h) sustained maximum in 1966>br/> 10.0 knots (19 km/h) economic in 1966
- Range: 10,300 nautical miles (19,100 km) at 17.3 knots (32.0 km/h) (19,076 kilometers at 32 km/h) in 1966; 20,800 nmi at 10.0 knots (18.5 km/h) (38,522 km at 19 km/h) in 1966
- Capacity: 166,430 US gallons (630,000 L) (630.0 kiloliters) diesel fuel
- Complement: 89 (10 officers, 2 warrant officers, 77 enlisted personnel) in 1966
- Sensors & processing systems: Radar: SPS-23; Sonar: SQS-1
- Armament: 1 × 5"/38 gun (replaced in 1972 with 5"/54); 6 × .50-caliber (12.7 mm) machine guns; 2 × 90 mm mortars on 01 deck forward of the bridge

USS Unimak (AVP-31) was a United States Navy Barnegat-class small seaplane tender in commission from 1943 to 1946 that saw service in World War II. After the war, she was in commission in the United States Coast Guard as the cutter USCGC Unimak (WAVP-379), later WHEC-379, WTR-379, and again WHEC-379, from 1949 to 1975 and from 1977 to 1988.

== Construction and commissioning ==
Construction began on Unimak on 15 February 1942 at Harbor Island, Seattle by Associated Shipbuilders, Inc. She was launched on 27 May 1942, sponsored by Mrs. H. B. Berry, the wife of Captain H. B. Berry, the personnel officer of the 13th Naval District, and commissioned on 31 December 1943.

== United States Navy service ==
=== World War II ===
==== Operations in Central America, the Galápagos Islands, and the Caribbean ====
Unimak was tested into late January 1944. When tests were completed, she departed San Diego on 20 March 1944, bound for the Panama Canal Zone. Arriving at Balboa, Panama, on 28 March 1944, Unimak operated on the Pacific coast of Central America into April 1944, providing logistics support to advanced seaplane bases at Santa Elena Bay, Ecuador, and at Aeolian Bay, Baltra Island, in the Galápagos Islands. She soon shifted to Coco Solo on the Caribbean side of the Panama Canal and transported men and materiel to Barranquilla, Colombia, arriving there on 25 April 1944.

After escorting the merchant ship SS Genevieve Lykes back to Coco Solo on 23 and 24 June 1944, Unimak conducted routine exercises with patrol planes into July 1944. On 4 July 1944 she received reports that a tanker near her position had been torpedoed, and headed for the damaged ship. When she arrived on the scene late that day, Unimak found the tanker still underway, making for the Panama coast. She immediately commenced screening the disabled ship and, aided by an escort of United States Army Air Forces and U.S. Navy planes, shepherded the tanker safely to Colón, Panama, late on the afternoon of 5 July 1944.

Soon thereafter, Unimak shaped her course towards the last reported position of the U.S. Navy K-class blimp K-53. At 15:32 hours on 9 July 1944, she sighted two yellow rubber life rafts and the wreckage of the crashed blimp floating on the water. At 15:58 hours, Unimak took on board nine survivors and sank the unsalvageable blimp by collapsing the bag with 40-millimeter gunfire. She then landed the survivors at Portland Bight, Jamaica.

On 13 July 1944, Unimak joined with the destroyer USS John D. Edwards in hunting for a submarine reported to be lurking nearby. Within a few days, word of a crashed plane sent the two ships speeding for the last reported position of the aircraft. When they arrived at the crash site, they found widespread debris and small floating pieces of the crashed plane. It was noted in the ship's diary that they recovered a "mutilated unidentifiable crewmember's body" that was "badly blasted and burned". The aviator was buried at sea with full military honors on 16 July 1944 at 10°14′30″N 078°53′00″W.

Unimak remained in the Caribbean through the autumn of 1944, tending patrol planes, conducting logistics support missions for advanced seaplane bases, and occasionally towing targets for the patrol planes training in the area. On 15 December 1944, the seaplane tender USS Rockaway relieved Unimak, releasing her to steam north via Norfolk, Virginia to Boston.

==== Voyages to England ====
Arriving at Boston at the end of December 1944, Unimak underwent availability at the Boston Navy Yard for the entire month of January 1945. She got underway for England on 14 February 1945, but an engineering casualty forced her to return to Boston for a major propeller shaft alignment which lasted into March.

On 7 April 1945, Unimak got underway for the British Isles and proceeded, via Bahia Praia in the Azores, to Bristol, England, on the first of two voyages to England to bring back supplies and men from decommissioned U.S. Navy patrol plane squadrons in the United Kingdom, and was engaged in these activities when WWII ended in Europe in May 1945. On the second voyage, from 5 June 1945 to 15 June 1945, Unimak transported the men and material of Patrol Bomber Squadron 103 (VPB-103 and 105) from Bristol to Norfolk.

==== Transfer to the Pacific ====
Departing Hampton Roads, Virginia, on 20 July 1945, bound for the United States West Coast, Unimak transited the Panama Canal on 26 July 1945 and arrived at San Diego on 3 August 1945. She got underway for Pearl Harbor, Hawaii on 12 August 1945. She was en route when hostilities with Japan ended on 15 August 1945 bringing World War II to a close.

=== Post-World War II ===
Unimak operated in the Hawaiian Islands until 7 September 1945, when she headed for the Aleutian Islands. She operated in the northern Pacific Ocean – calling in the Territory of Alaska at Adak and Attu in the Aleutians and at Kodiak on Kodiak Island, and once at Petropavlovsk-Kamchatsky in the Soviet Union – into November 1945 before heading southward to prepare for inactivation.

Reporting for inactivation in December 1945, Unimak was decommissioned on 26 July 1946 and placed in reserve.

== United States Coast Guard service ==
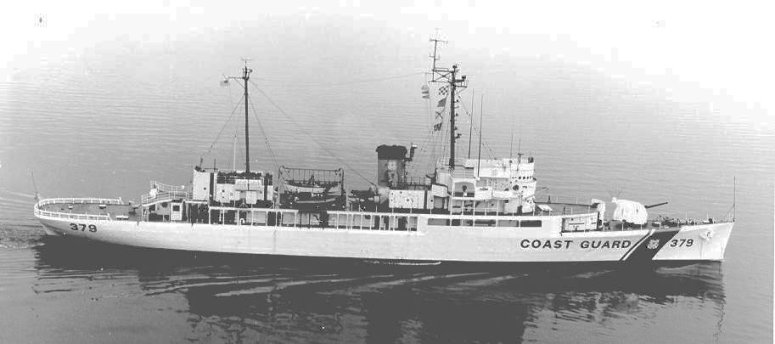
Coast Guard cutter USCGC Unimak (WHEC-379) on 8 June 1987.

Barnegat-class ships were very reliable and seaworthy and had good habitability. The Coast Guard viewed them as ideal for ocean station duty, in which they would perform weather reporting and search and rescue tasks. They were modified by having a balloon shelter, oceanographic equipment, an oceanographic winch, and a hydrographic winch installed. After World War II, the U.S. Navy transferred 18 of the ships to the Coast Guard, in which they were known as the Casco-class cutters.

The Navy loaned Unimak to the United States Coast Guard on 14 September 1948. After undergoing conversion for Coast Guard use, she was commissioned into the Coast Guard on 3 January 1949 as USCGC Unimak (WAVP-379).

=== Service history ===
==== 1949–1975 ====
Unimak was home-ported in Boston, Massachusetts, from 3 January 1949 to 1 September 1956. Her primary duty during her Coast Guard service was to serve on ocean stations to gather meteorological data. While on duty in one of these stations, she was required to patrol a 210-square-mile (544-square-kilometer) area for three weeks at a time, leaving the area only when physically relieved by another Coast Guard cutter or in the case of a dire emergency. While on station, she acted as an aircraft check point at the point of no return, a relay point for messages from ships and aircraft, as a source of the latest weather information for passing aircraft, as a floating oceanographic laboratory, and as a search-and-rescue ship for downed aircraft and vessels in distress. She also engaged in law enforcement operations.

In June 1956, Unimak patrolled the Newport, Rhode Island-to-Bermuda race.

Unimak was stationed at Cape May, New Jersey, from 1 September 1956 to 7 August 1972 and used primarily for training United States Coast Guard Reserve personnel, including training cruises to Brazil and Nova Scotia. She took part in the United States Coast Guard Academy cadet cruise of August 1965.

Unimak was reclassified as a high endurance cutter and redesignated WHEC-379 on 1 May 1966. Her loan period from the Navy came to an end on 26 September 1966, when she was transferred permanently from the Navy to the Coast Guard.

On 7 March 1967, Unimak rescued six Cuban refugees in the Yucatán Channel. On 10 March 1967 she rescued survivors from the fishing vessel Bunkie III in Florida waters. On 15 March 1967, she rescued 12 Cuban refugees who were stranded on an island. On 29 May 1969, she towed the fishing vessel Sirocco–which was disabled 35 nautical miles (65 km) east of Fort Pierce, Florida–to safety.

Unimak was reclassified as a training ship and again redesignated, this time as WTR-379, on 28 November 1969. On 3 April 1970, she stood by the grounded merchant ship Vassiliki near Mayaguana Island until a commercial tugboat arrived to assist Vassiliki.

From 7 August 1972 to 31 May 1975, Unimak was stationed at Yorktown, Virginia, and was again used to train Coast Guard reservists.

The Coast Guard decommissioned Unimak on 31 May 1975 and placed her in reserve at the Coast Guard Yard at Curtis Bay, Maryland.

==== 1977–1988 ====
On 14 January 1977 the Unimak suffered a major fire that started in the B2 engine room and burned up thru the main deck and 01 deck. The fire was extinguished with assistance of the Boston Fire Department. The Unimak was then towed to the Coast Guard Ship Yard in Baltimore Maryland. On 22 August 1977, the Coast Guard recommissioned Unimak, reclassifying her as a high-endurance cutter and returning her to the designation WHEC-379. She was home-ported at New Bedford, Massachusetts, for the rest of her Coast Guard career. During this stint in commission, she was used primarily for fisheries patrol in the Atlantic, law enforcement operations in the Caribbean and as a weather ship for the United States International Weather Patrol.

Unimak also interdicted the trafficking of illegal drugs. On 6 October 1980, she seized the merchant ship Janeth 340 nautical miles (630 km) southeast of Miami; Janeth was carrying 500 bales of marijuana. On 14 October 1980, she seized the pleasure craft Rescue, which was carrying approximately 500 bales of marijuana, and the pleasure craft Snail, with two tons of marijuana on board, in the Gulf of Mexico. On 17 October 1980, she seized the merchant vessel Amalaka southwest of Key West, Florida; Amalaka was carrying 1,000 bales of marijuana. On 19 October 1980, she seized the fishing vessel Wright's Pride southwest of Key West; the ship had 30 tons of marijuana aboard. In March 1981, while on an Officer Candidate School training cruise, she intercepted the merchant ship Mayo with 40 tons of marijuana on board.

On 9 October 1982, (Note: USCG source materials state 9 December 1982, but that appears to be the date the story was released rather than the date the event occurred) Unimak towed the disabled fishing vessel Sacred Heart away from Daid Banks, 45 nautical miles (83 km; 52 mi) east of Cape Cod, Massachusetts, in 30-foot (9.1 m) seas.

Between 28 January 1983 and 9 March 1983, Unimak again deployed to the Caribbean for a law-enforcement patrol. On 27 and 28 February 1983, she towed the dismasted sailing vessel Wandering Star to Matthew Town on Great Inagua in the Bahamas. On 3 March 1983, she towed the disabled merchant vessel Yadrina to Matthew Town.

On 30 November 1984, Unimak seized the sailboat Lola 100 nautical miles (190 km; 120 mi) north of Barranquilla; Lola had 1.5 tons of marijuana on board. Another drug seizure occurred on 2 November 1985, when Unimak seized the tug Zeus 3 and a barge 200 nautical miles (370 km; 230 mi) south of the Dominican Republic; the two vessels were carrying 40 tons of marijuana.

== Decommissioning and disposal ==
Unimak was the last of the 35 Barnegat-class ships and the last of the 18 Casco-class cutters in service in the United States when the Coast Guard decommissioned her on 29 April 1988 and transferred her to the U.S. Navy. She was then sunk that year as an artificial reef off the Virginia coast in 150 feet (46 meters) of water.

== Awards ==
- American Campaign Medal
- European-African-Middle Eastern Campaign Medal
- Asiatic-Pacific Campaign Medal
- World War II Victory Medal
- National Defense Service Medal with star
