= USS Casco (AVP-12) =

Tender of the United States Navy

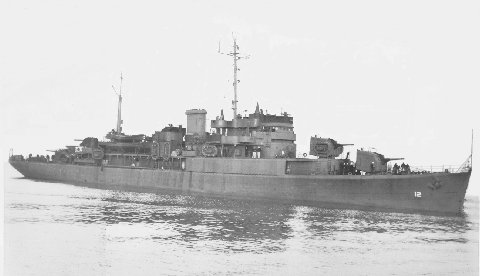
- USS Casco (AVP-12) in Puget Sound on 3 March 1943. Her main battery has been increased to four 5-inch (127 mm) 38-caliber guns.

History

United States Navy
- Name: USS Casco (AVP-12)
- Namesake: Casco Bay on the coast of Maine
- Builder: Puget Sound Navy Yard, Bremerton, Washington
- Laid down: 30 May 1940
- Launched: 15 November 1941
- Sponsored by: Mrs. W. J. Giles
- Commissioned: 27 December 1941
- Decommissioned: 10 April 1947
- Honors and awards: Three battle stars for World War II service
- Fate: Loaned to U.S. Coast Guard 19 April 1949
- Acquired: Returned by U.S. Coast Guard March 1969

United States Coast Guard
- Name: USCGC Casco (WAVP-370)
- Namesake: Previous name retained
- Acquired: 19 April 1949
- Commissioned: 19 April 1949
- Reclassified: High-endurance cutter (WHEC-370) on 1 May 1966
- Decommissioned: 21 March 1969
- Fate: Returned to U.S. Navy March 1969 - Sunk as target
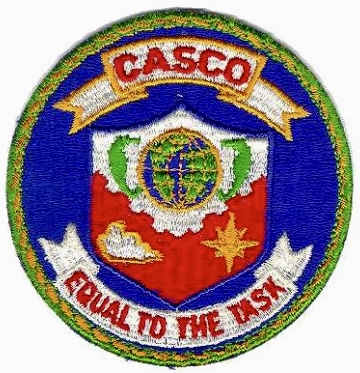
- Badge: Crest of USCGC Casco

General characteristics (seaplane tender)
- Class & type: Barnegat-class small seaplane tender
- Displacement: 1,766 tons (light); 2,750 tons (full load)
- Length: 311 ft 8 in (95.00 m)
- Beam: 41 ft 1 in (12.52 m)
- Draft: 13 ft 6 in (4.11 m)
- Installed power: 6,000 horsepower (4.48 megawatts)
- Propulsion: diesel engines, two shafts
- Speed: 18.6 knots (34.4 km/h)
- Complement: 215 (ship's company); 367 (with aviation unit)
- Sensors & processing systems: Radar; sonar
- Armament: 1 × single 5 in (130 mm) 38-caliber dual-purpose gun mount; 1 × quad 40 mm antiaircraft gun mount; 2 × dual 40-mm antiaircraft gun mounts; 4 × dual 20 mm antiaircraft gun mounts; 2 × depth charge tracks
- Aviation facilities: Supplies, spare parts, repairs, and berthing for one seaplane squadron; 80,000 US gallons (300,000 L)

General characteristics (Coast Guard cutter)
- Class & type: Casco-class cutter
- Displacement: 2,528.72 tons (full load)
- Length: 310 ft 6.75 in (94.6595 m) overall; 299 ft 11 in (91.41 m) between perpendiculars
- Beam: 41 ft 0 in (12.50 m) maximum
- Draught: 13 ft 1 in (3.99 m) maximum
- Installed power: 6,000 bhp (4,500 kW)
- Propulsion: Fairbanks-Morse direct-reversing diesel engines, two shafts; 166,429 US gallons (630,000 L) of fuel
- Speed: 18.6 knots (34.4 km/h) (maximum); 17.4 knots (32.2 km/h) (maximum sustained); 12.4 knots (23.0 km/h) (economic)
- Range: 10,138 nautical miles (18,776 km) at 17.4 knots (32.2 km/h); 20,000 nautical miles (37,000 km) at 12.4 knots (23.0 km/h)s,
- Complement: 151 (10 officers, 3 warrant officers, 138 enlisted personnel)
- Sensors & processing systems: Radar: SPS-23, SPS-29B; Sonar: SQS-1
- Armament: one single 5-inch (127 mm) 38-caliber dual-purpose gun mount; 1 x Mark 10-1 antisubmarine projector

The third USS Casco (AVP-12) was a United States Navy Barnegat-class small seaplane tender in commission from 1941 to 1947. She saw service in World War II. After her decommissioning, the U.S. Navy loaned her to the United States Coast Guard, in which she served as the cutter USCGC Casco (WAVP-370), later WHEC-370, from 1949 to 1969.

== Construction and commissioning ==
Casco was laid down on 30 May 1941 at Puget Sound Navy Yard in Bremerton, Washington. She was launched on 15 November 1941, sponsored by Mrs. W. J. Giles, and commissioned on 27 December 1941.

== United States Navy service ==
=== World War II ===
==== North Pacific operations ====
After a period patrolling and caring for seaplanes off the coast of the Pacific Northwest, Casco arrived at Sitka, Alaska, on 5 May 1942 for duty surveying Aleutian waters, laying moorings for seaplanes, and providing seaplane tender services. Based at Cold Bay, she operated at Dutch Harbor, Chernofski Harbor, Kodiak, and Nazan Bay.

While lying at anchor in Nazan Bay on 30 August 1942, Casco was torpedoed by the Japanese submarine RO-61. The resulting boiler explosion killed five of her men and wounded 20, but due to heroics such as those of Aviation Ordanceman J. Cobean, who dove into the burning engine room and extinguished the source of the fire, a burning magnesium flare. The fire was put out and emergency crews got the ship underway so that she could be beached and later salvaged. Casco was refloated on 12 September 1942, and, after emergency repairs at Dutch Harbor and Kodiak, she received a thorough overhaul at Puget Sound Navy Yard.

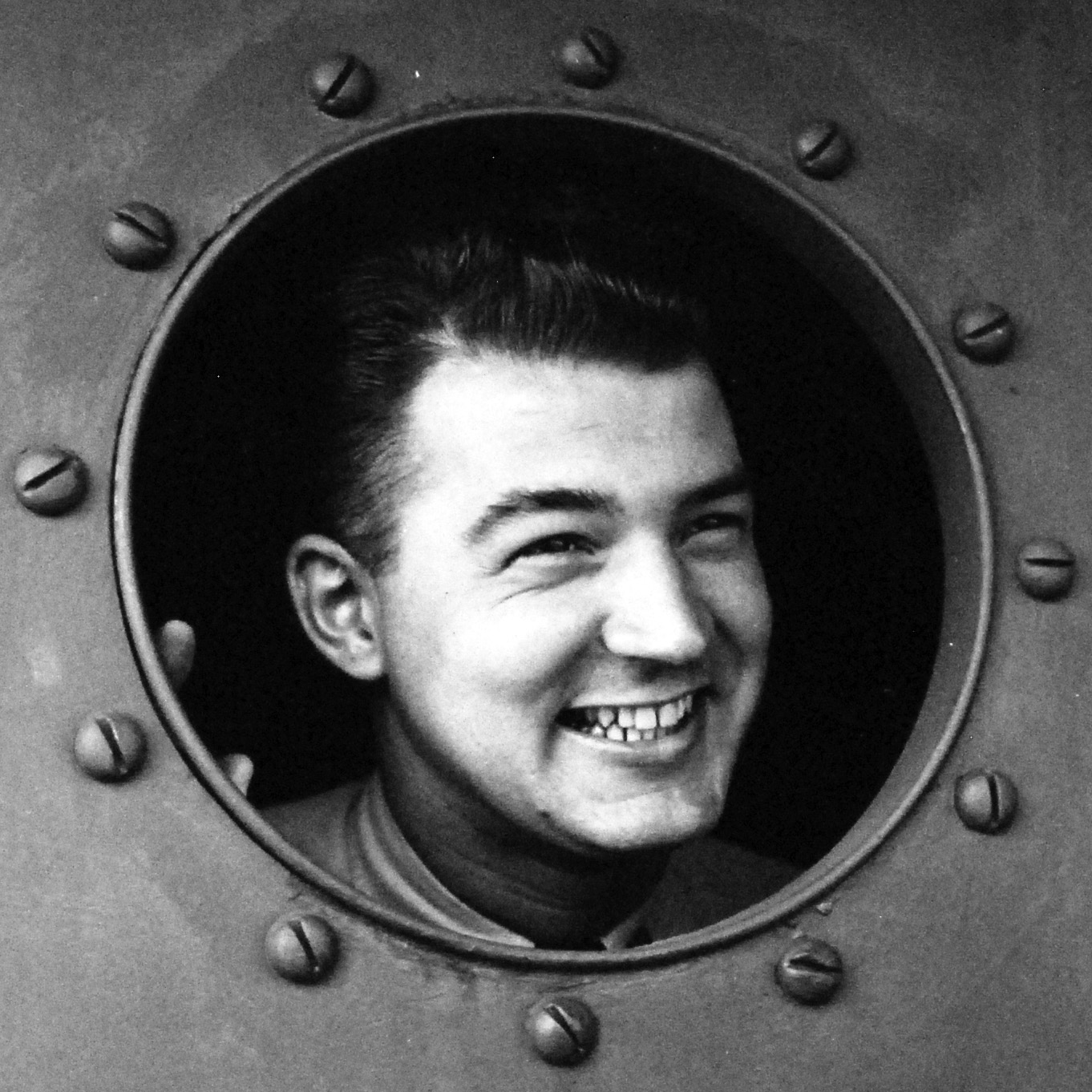
Aleutian Islands Campaign, Lieutenant Hodnik, Executive Officer of USS Casco (AVP-12) anchored off Attu in July 1943

Casco returned to duty in the Aleutian Islands in March 1943, operating at Constantine Harbor, Amchitka, as tender to Fleet Air Wing Four (FAW-4). In May 1943 she moved to Attu, to care for the seaplanes conducting antisubmarine patrol and search missions in support of the United States Army's invasion of Attu, guarding against further Japanese reinforcement or penetration of the Aleutians. Casco's service in these waters where weather was often as formidable an enemy as the Japanese ended in November 1943, when she left for overhaul at Puget Sound Navy Yard. During one of her stays in the Aleutians, an OS2U Kingfisher from the Casco was borrowed by Colonel William O. Eareckson for use as a forward air control aircraft, which personally flew on numerous missions.

==== Central Pacific operations ====
Casco arrived in the Marshall Islands in February 1944 to tend seaplanes of patrol squadrons at Majuro and Kwajalein during the American occupation of those atolls, and later at Eniwetok until September 1944. Temporarily assigned to carry cargo for the buildup for the invasion of the Philippine Islands, she shuttled between Saipan, Ulithi Atoll, and the Palau Islands until November 1944, then returned to seaplane tender duty, in the Palaus until January 1945, and at Ulithi until April 1945. After overhaul at Saipan, she arrived in Kerama Retto on 25 April 1945 to care not only for seaplanes, but also for a motor torpedo boat squadron, all engaged in the American invasion and occupation of Okinawa.

Casco returning to the United States West Coast in July 1945 for upkeep, and was there when hostilities with Japan ceased and World War II came to an end on 15 August 1945.

==== Honors and awards ====
Casco received three battle stars for World War II service.

=== Post-World War II ===
Her upkeep completed in September 1945, Casco returned to the Philippines in October 1945. Departing for the United States in April 1946, she then briefly assumed training duties at Galveston, Texas.

=== Decommissioning ===
Casco was decommissioned on 10 April 1947 and laid up in the Atlantic Reserve Fleet at Orange, Texas.

== United States Coast Guard service ==
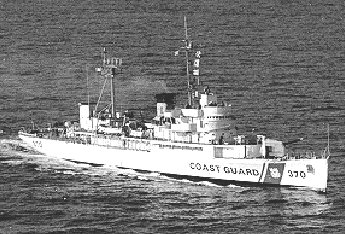
USCGC Casco (WHEC-370) in 1969.

The Barnegat-class ships were very reliable and seaworthy and had good habitability, and the United States Coast Guard viewed them as ideal for ocean station duty, in which they would perform weather reporting, law enforcement, and search and rescue tasks, once they were modified by having a balloon shelter added aft and having oceanographic equipment, an oceanographic winch, and a hydrographic winch installed. After World War II, the U.S. Navy transferred 18 of the ships to the U.S. Coast Guard, in which they were known as the Casco-class cutters.

Casco herself was transferred to the United States Coast Guard on 19 April 1949, and was commissioned as USCGC Casco (WAVP-370), the first Coast Guard ship of the name, the same day.

=== Service history ===
Casco was assigned to operate from Boston, Massachusetts, which was her home port throughout her period of service in the Coast Guard. She served as a weather reporting ship, and also supported Coast Guard law-enforcement and search-and-rescue operations in the Atlantic Ocean, operating on ocean stations. While on duty in one of these stations, she was required to patrol a 210-square-mile (544-square-kilometer) area for three weeks at a time, leaving the area only when physically relieved by another Coast Guard cutter or in the case of a dire emergency. While on station, she acted as an aircraft check point at the point of no return, a relay point for messages from ships and aircraft, as a source of the latest weather information for passing aircraft, as a floating oceanographic laboratory, and as a search-and-rescue ship for downed aircraft and vessels in distress. She was the first ship commanded by future Commandant of the Coast Guard Admiral J. William Kime.

Casco responded to the a distress call from the sinking fishing vessel Magellan on 22 August 1949, rescuing Magellan's crew and then saving Magellan from sinking.

When the fishing vessel Wamsutta became disabled, Casco took her under tow and towed her 86 nautical miles (159 km) from a point north of Nantucket, Massachusetts, to Boston on 23 January 1950.

On 26 August 1950, Casco rendezvoused with the Greek merchant ship Igor 360 nautical miles (670 km) northeast of Bermuda and evacuated an Igor crewman in need of medical assistance. On 24 November 1954, she went to the assistance of the disabled fishing vessel Sea Ranger and towed Sea Ranger to safety.

On 23 March 1951, a Douglas C-124 Globemaster II ditched in the Atlantic Ocean after an explosion in the cargo hold, several hundred nautical miles west-southwest of Ireland and close to Casco's station. The ditching and subsequent evacuation were successful, but when Casco arrived at the ditching position, the aircraft and its occupants had vanished. No satisfactory explanation has been given for the disappearance of the crew and passengers.

On 17 February 1956, Casco took 21 men off of a United States Navy seaplane that had ditched 100 nautical miles (190 km) south of Bermuda, then towed the seaplane to St. George's Harbor at Bermuda.

On 20 October 1958, Casco took a crewman in medical distress off of the merchant ship Maye Lykes.

In cooperation with universities in the eastern United States and international agencies, Casco conducted oceanographic experiments between South America and Africa from 1 August 1963 to 19 August 1963.

Casco was classified as a high endurance cutter and redesignated WHEC-370 on 1 May 1966.

Casco helped fight a major fire on Long Wharf at Boston on 27 March 1968.

== Final disposition ==
The Coast Guard returned Casco to the U.S. Navy in March 1969, and she was struck from the Naval Vessel Register. She was sunk as a target in the North Atlantic Ocean at 36°40′00″N 024°16′00″W on 15 May 1969. Torpedoed twice, she sank at 16:33 hours, less than five minutes after the second torpedo struck her on her starboard side.
