= USS Matagorda =

Tender of the United States Navy

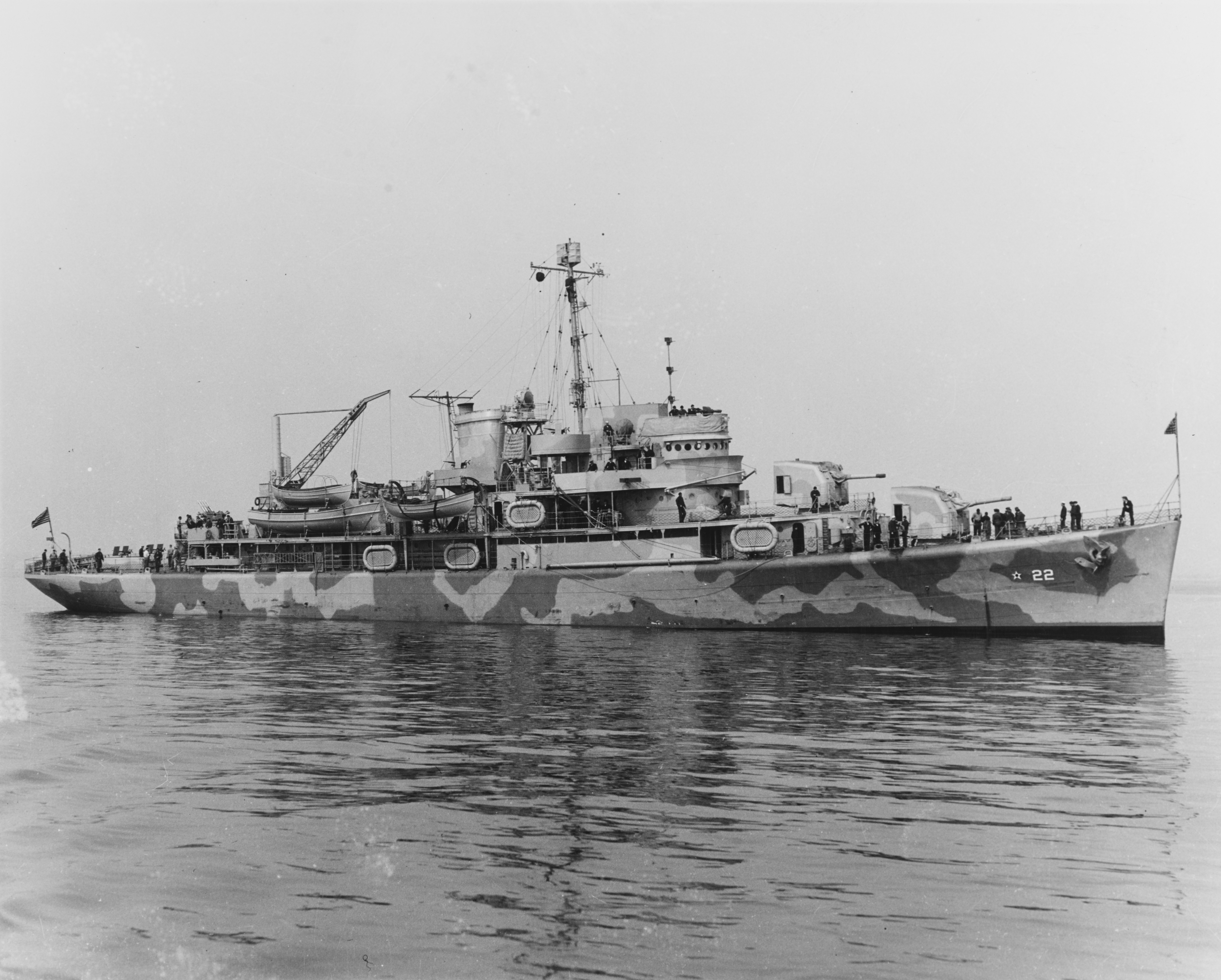
- USS Matagorda (AVP-22) photographed on 3 April 1942 at Boston, Massachusetts, in her original configuration. She is painted in Measure 12 Modified camouflage.

History

United States
- Name: USS Matagorda (AVP-22)
- Namesake: Matagorda Bay, on the southeastern coast of Texas
- Builder: Boston Navy Yard, Boston, Massachusetts
- Laid down: 6 September 1940
- Launched: 18 March 1941
- Sponsored by: Miss Nancy Rowland Brand
- Commissioned: 16 December 1941
- Reclassified: Miscellaneous auxiliary (as press information ship), AG-122, 30 July 1945; Small seaplane tender, AVP-22, 10 September 1945
- Fate: Loaned to U.S. Coast Guard 7 March 1949
- Stricken: 1 July 1968
- Acquired: Returned by U.S. Coast Guard 30 October 1968
- Fate: Sunk as target October 1969

United States
- Name: USCGC Matagorda (WAVP-373)
- Namesake: Previous name retained
- Acquired: Loaned by U.S. Navy to U.S. Coast Guard 7 March 1949
- Commissioned: 8 June 1949
- Reclassified: High endurance cutter, WHEC-373, 1 May 1966
- Decommissioned: 15 October 1967
- Fate: Returned to U.S. Navy 30 October 1968

General characteristics (seaplane tender)
- Class & type: Barnegat-class small seaplane tender
- Displacement: 1,766 tons (light); 2,750 tons (full load)
- Length: 311 ft 8 in (95.00 m)
- Beam: 41 ft 1 in (12.52 m)
- Draft: 13 ft 6 in (4.11 m)
- Installed power: 6,000 horsepower (4.48 megawatts)
- Propulsion: Diesel engines, two shafts
- Speed: 18.6 knots (34.4 km/h)
- Complement: 215 (ship's company); 367 (including aviation unit)
- Sensors & processing systems: Radar; sonar
- Armament: As built: 2 × single 5 in (130 mm)/38 caliber dual-purpose gun mounts; 4 × 1.1"/75 caliber gun (28 mm) antiaircraft guns; 10 × 20 mm antiaircraft guns; 2 × depth charge tracks; Later: 2 × single 5-inch (127 mm) 38-caliber dual-purpose gun mounts; 4 × dual 20-mm antiaircraft gun mounts; 2 × depth charge tracks
- Aviation facilities: Supplies, spare parts, repairs, and berthing for one seaplane squadron; 80,000 US gallons (300,000 L) aviation fuel

General characteristics (Coast Guard cutter)
- Class & type: Casco-class cutter
- Displacement: 2,515.2 tons (full load) in 1965
- Length: 311 ft 7 in (94.97 m) overall; 300 ft 0 in (91.44 m) between perpendiculars
- Beam: 41 ft 0 in (12.50 m) maximum
- Draft: 12 ft 5 in (3.78 m) maximum in 1967
- Installed power: 6,000 bhp (4,500 kW) in 1967
- Propulsion: Fairbanks-Morse direct reversing diesel engines, two shafts; 166,430 US gallons (630,000 L) of fuel
- Speed: 17.1 knots (31.7 km/h) (maximum sustained in 1967); 13.0 knots (24.1 km/h) (economic) in 1967
- Range: 9,725 nautical miles (18,011 km) at 17.1 knots (31.7 km/h) in 1967; 16,600 nautical miles (30,700 km) at 13.0 knots (24.1 km/h) in 1967
- Complement: 149 (10 officers, 3 warrant officers, 136 enlisted personnel) in 1967
- Sensors & processing systems: Radars in 1967: SPS-23, SPS-29A; Sonar in 1967: SQS-1
- Armament: In 1967: one single 5-inch (127 mm) 38-caliber Mark 30-75 gun, 1 x Mark 52 Mod 3 director, 1 x Mark 26 fire-control radar; 4 × Mark 6 Mod 2 depth charge projectors; 1 × Mark 10 Mod 1 antisubmarine projector

USS Matagorda (AVP-22/AG-122) (/ˈmætəˈɡɔːrdə/) was a United States Navy Barnegat-class seaplane tender in commission from 1941 to 1946 that saw service in World War II. After the war, she was in commission in the United States Coast Guard as the cutter USCGC Matagorda (WAVP-373), later WHEC-373, from 1949 to 1967.

== Construction, commissioning, and shakedown ==
Matagorda was laid down by the Boston Navy Yard at Boston, Massachusetts, on 6 September 1940. She was launched on 18 March 1941, sponsored by Miss Nancy Rowland Brand, and commissioned at Boston on 16 December 1941.

== United States Navy service ==
=== World War II ===
Matagorda remained at Boston until 3 April 1942, when she departed for shakedown and training in the Chesapeake Bay. She returned to Boston on 22 April 1942.

==== Operations in the Galápagos Islands, Panama Canal Zone, and Caribbean ====
After returning to Boston, Matagorda joined Patrol Wings Atlantic (PatWingLant) and loaded torpedoes and ordnance stores at Newport, Rhode Island. On 12 May 1942 she departed Newport and moved to Seymour Island in the Galápagos Islands. Arriving there on 25 May 1942, she relieved the seaplane tender USS Osmond Ingram (AVD-9) and began tending seaplanes of Patrol Wing 3 (PatWing 3).

After these duties ended, Matagorda arrived at Coco Solo in the Panama Canal Zone on 20 June 1942. She escorted merchant ships to Cuba and Jamaica before resuming seaplane tending duty on 22 July 1942, this time from bases in Central America and South America: She operated out of Puerto Castilla, Honduras, and Cartagena, Colombia until returning to the Panama Canal Zone on 12 November 1942.

Following a supply and escort run to Puerto Rico and Trinidad, Matagorda departed Port of Spain, Trinidad, on 23 November 1942 and on 4 December 1942 arrived at Boston for alterations and overhaul.

==== Voyage to Newfoundland ====
On 5 January 1943, Matagorda departed Boston to carry troops and supplies to Naval Station Argentia, Newfoundland, returning to Boston on 14 January 1943.

==== Return to the Caribbean ====
After loading aviation supplies at Norfolk, Virginia, Matagorda arrived at San Juan, Puerto Rico, on 11 February 1943. She operated primarily out of Puerto Rico until early August 1943, escorting merchant ships and transporting ordnance and aviation supplies to bases in the Caribbean. She called at the Virgin Islands, Cuba, the Dominican Republic, and Trinidad.

==== North Atlantic operations ====
Matagorda departed San Juan on 3 August 1943 and steamed via Bermuda and Norfolk to Argentia, where she arrived on 26 August 1943. On 28 August 1943 she joined Convoy UT-1 and made a voyage to the United Kingdom, arriving at Pembroke, Wales, on 4 September 1943. After unloading cargo, she sailed via Iceland and Boston to Norfolk, arriving there on 27 September 1943. Between 5 October 1943 and 5 March 1944 she made two more round trips across the Atlantic Ocean. She carried men and cargo to Pembroke and Bristol, England, and made escort and supply runs to Casablanca, French Morocco, and Gibraltar.

==== South Atlantic operations ====
Departing Boston on 18 April 1944, Matagorda loaded seaplane supplies at Bayonne, New Jersey, and departed Bayonne on 22 April 1944 for Brazil, reaching Recife, Brazil, on 6 May 1944. Until the beginning of April 1945, she conducted extensive training and supply operations and ranged Brazilian waters from Belém to Florianópolis. In late May 1944 and again in July 1944 she tended seaplanes at Florianópolis.

Matagorda interrupted this duty on 24 July 1944 and 25 July 1944, when she searched for and rescued the entire crew of 67 men from the American merchant ship SS William Gaston, torpedoed by a German submarine late on 23 July 1944 off the Brazilian coast. Again, while operating out of Fortaleza, she rescued five survivors of a downed Consolidated PBY-5 Catalina flying boat plus the crew from an assisting Martin PBM Mariner flying boat on 29 August 1944.

Matagorda made numerous runs along the Brazilian coast during supply and training missions. Based at Recife, she visited many Brazilian ports including Vitória, Natal, the island of Fernando de Noronha, Bahia, and Rio de Janeiro.

==== Voyages to the Caribbean ====
Matagorda departed Recife on 1 April 1945, touched briefly at San Juan, Puerto Rico, and reached Norfolk on 14 April 1945. From 2 June 1945 to 6 July 1945 she made two runs to Bermuda and Puerto Rico, returning to Norfolk with men of seaplane squadrons.

==== Conversion to press information ship ====
Matagorda steamed to New York City on 10 July 1945 to begin conversion to a press information ship. As such her mission would be to provide all proper news facilities for the press and transport them to the coast of Japan where they would cover operations “Olympic” and “Coronet”, projected for the invasion of Japan in 1945 and 1946. She was reclassified as a "miscellaneous auxiliary" and redesignated AG-122 on 30 July 1945.

The cessation of hostilities with Japan and end of World War II came on 15 August 1945 made the invasion of Japan unnecessary, and Matagorda's conversion was halted in early September 1945.

=== Post-World War II ===
Converted back into a seaplane tender and once again designated AVP-22 as of 10 September 1945, Matagorda departed New York City for Norfolk on 17 October 1945. On 31 October 1945 she departed Norfolk for Orange, Texas. Arriving there on 5 November 1945 for inactivation, she was decommissioned on 20 February 1946 and laid up in the Atlantic Reserve Fleet's Texas Group at Orange.

== United States Coast Guard service ==
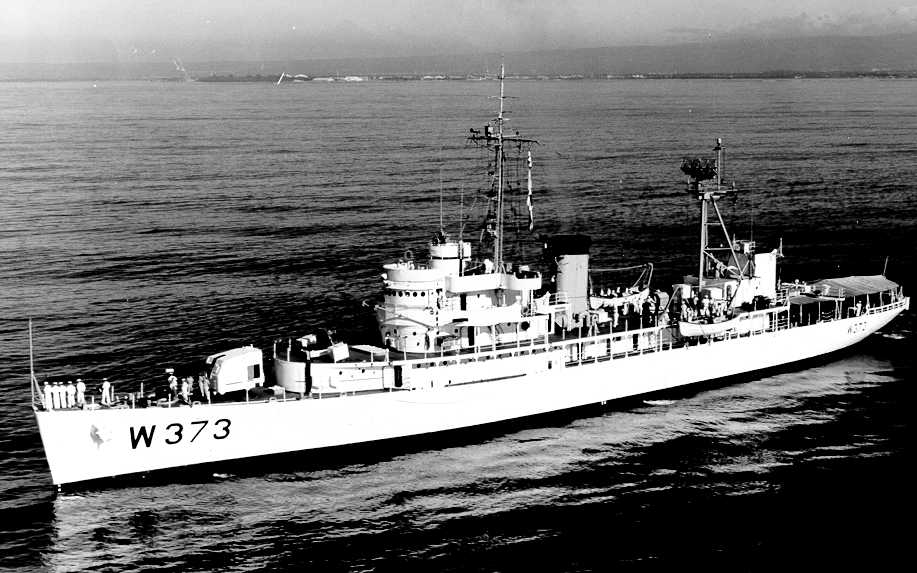
USCGC Matagorda (WHEC-373) on 21 November 1966, before the Coast Guard's adoption of the "racing stripe" markings on its ships.

Barnegat-class ships were very reliable and seaworthy and had good habitability, and the Coast Guard viewed them as ideal for ocean station duty, in which they would perform weather reporting and search and rescue tasks, once they were modified by having a balloon shelter added aft and having oceanographic equipment, an oceanographic winch, and a hydrographic winch installed. After World War II, the U.S. Navy transferred 18 of the ships to the Coast Guard, in which they were known as the Casco-class cutters.

The Navy loaned Matagorda to the Coast Guard on 7 March 1949. The Coast Guard converted her into a weather-reporting ship and commissioned her as USCGC Matagorda (WAVP-373) on 8 June 1949.

Matagorda's primary duty during her Coast Guard service was to serve on ocean stations to gather meteorological data. While on duty in one of these stations, she was required to patrol a 210-square-mile (544-square-kilometer) area for three weeks at a time, leaving the area only when physically relieved by another Coast Guard cutter or in the case of a dire emergency. While on station, she acted as an aircraft check point at the point of no return, a relay point for messages from ships and aircraft, as a source of the latest weather information for passing aircraft, as a floating oceanographic laboratory, and as a search-and-rescue ship for downed aircraft and vessels in distress, and she engaged in law enforcement operations.

Matagorda was stationed at Boston, Massachusetts, from her commissioning on 8 June 1949 until 1954. She was used for law enforcement, ocean station, and search and rescue operations in the Atlantic Ocean.

In 1954 she was transferred to Honolulu, Hawaii, and took up duties in the Pacific Ocean similar to those she had performed in the Atlantic.

On 26 January 1956, Matagorda delivered clothing from Washington Intermediate School in Honolulu to an orphanage in Japan.

In August 1960, Matagorda towed the disabled fishing vessel Wild Goose II.

On 12 January 1965, Matagorda stood by the disabled Liberian tanker Saint Helena 1,000 nautical miles (1,900 km) northwest of Midway Atoll; Saint Helena had sustained hull damage due to heavy seas and was in danger of breaking in two. Matagorda herself sustained damage; she was relieved by the Coast Guard cutter USCGC Bering Strait (WAVP-382) on 13 January 1965 and proceeded to Hawaii, via Midway, in heavy seas.

In mid-September 1965, Matagorda escorted the disabled Liberian merchant ship Londias to Honolulu.

On 27 February 1966, Matagorda transferred 12,000 US gallons (45,000 L) of water to the disabled merchant ship Union Success and took her under tow until relieved of towing duties.

Matagorda was reclassified as a high endurance cutter and redesignated WHEC-373 on 1 May 1966.

== Decommissioning and disposal ==
Matagorda was decommissioned at Honolulu on 15 October 1967, and she was stricken from the Naval Vessel Register on 1 July 1968. On 30 October 1968, the Coast Guard returned her to the Navy, which sank her as a target 72 nautical miles (133 km) off Hawaii in October 1969 in position 20°08′00″N 158°30′00″W
