= Phạm Ngũ Lão (disambiguation) =

Phạm Ngũ Lão was a leading general of the Trần Dynasty.

Phạm Ngũ Lão may also refer to:

== Administrative division ==
- Phạm Ngũ Lão, District 1, a ward of Ho Chi Minh City
- Phạm Ngũ Lão, Thủy Nguyên city, a ward of Haiphong
- Phạm Ngũ Lão, Kim Động District, a commune of Hưng Yên province
- Former Phạm Ngũ Lão ward of Hải Dương city, Hải Dương province; now is a part Lê Thanh Nghị ward.

== Streets ==
- Phạm Ngũ Lão Street, a street in District 1, Ho Chi Minh City, Vietnam

== Seaplane tender ==
- RVNS Phạm Ngũ Lão (HQ-15), a frigate in commission in the Republic of Vietnam Navy from 1972 to 1975
- PRVSN Phạm Ngũ Lão (HQ-01), a patrol vessel in commission in the Vietnamese People's Navy in 1975
