= USS Coos Bay =

Tender of the United States Navy

Coordinates: 36.795°N 72.605°W

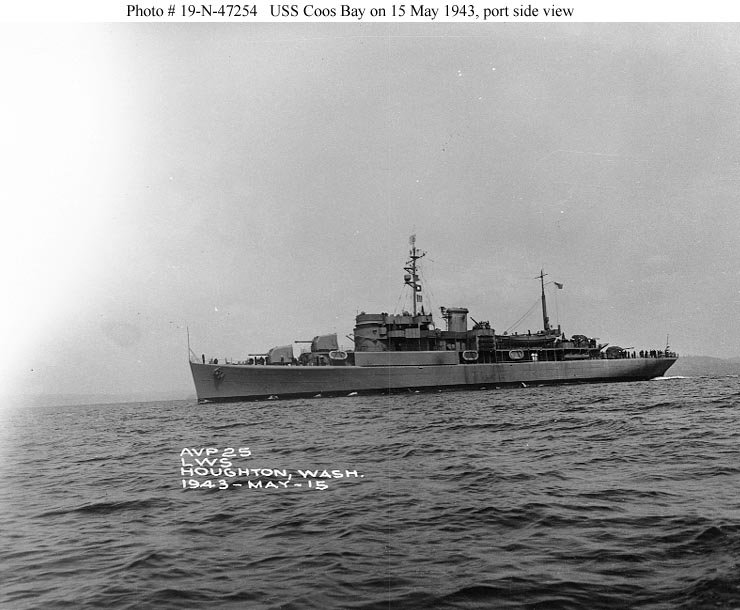
- USS Coos Bay (AVP-25) off Houghton, Washington, on her commissioning day, 15 May 1943

History

United States
- Name: USS Coos Bay (AVP-25)
- Namesake: Coos Bay on the coast of Oregon
- Laid down: 15 August 1941
- Launched: 15 May 1942
- Sponsored by: Mrs. L. E. Geheres
- Commissioned: 16 May 1943
- Decommissioned: 30 April 1946
- Honors and awards: Two battle stars for World War II service
- Fate: Loaned to U.S. Coast Guard 4 May 1949
- Acquired: Returned by Coast Guard 2 September 1967
- Fate: Sunk as target 9 January 1968

United States
- Name: USCGC Coos Bay (WAVP-376)
- Namesake: Previous name retained
- Acquired: Loaned by U.S. Navy to U.S. Coast Guard 5 January 1949
- Commissioned: 4 May 1949
- Decommissioned: 1 September 1966
- Reclassified: High endurance cutter (WHEC-376) 1 May 1966
- Decommissioned: 1 September 1966
- Fate: Returned to U.S. Navy 2 September 1967

General characteristics (seaplane tender)
- Class & type: Barnegat-class small seaplane tender
- Displacement: 1,766 tons(light); 2,750 tons (full load)
- Length: 311 ft 8 in (95.00 m)
- Beam: 41 ft 1 in (12.52 m)
- Draught: 13 ft 6 in (4.11 m)
- Installed power: 6,000 horsepower (4.48 megawatts)
- Propulsion: Diesel engines, two shafts
- Speed: 18.6 knots (34 km/h)
- Complement: 215 (ship's company); 376 (with aviation unit)
- Sensors & processing systems: Radar; sonar
- Armament: As completed four, later one, single 5 in (130 mm) 38-caliber dual-purpose gun mounts; one quad 40 mm antiaircraft gun mount; two dual 40-mm antiaircraft gun mounts; four dual 20-mm antiaircraft gun mounts; 2 × depth charge tracks
- Aviation facilities: Supplies, spare parts, repairs, and berthing for one seaplane squadron; 80,000 US gallons (300,000 L) aviation fuel

General characteristics (Coast Guard cutter)
- Class & type: Casco-class cutter
- Displacement: 2,510 tons (full load) in 1965
- Length: 310 ft 0.375 in (94.49753 m) overall; 300 ft 0 in (91.44 m) between perpendiculars
- Beam: 41 ft 0 in (12.50 m) maximum
- Draft: 13 ft 2 in (4.01 m) at full load in 1965
- Installed power: 6,080 bhp (4,530 kW)
- Propulsion: Fairbanks-Morse geared diesel engines, two shafts; 166,421 US gallons (629,970 L) of fuel
- Speed: 17.2 knots (31.9 km/h) (maximum sustained in 1965); 10.3 knots (19.1 km/h) (economic in 1965)
- Range: 9,974 nautical miles (18,472 km) at 17.2 knots (31.9 km/h) in 1965; 20,700 nautical miles (38,300 km) at 10.3 knots (19.1 km/h) in 1965
- Complement: 151 (10 officers, 3 warrant officers, 138 enlisted personnel) in 1965
- Sensors & processing systems: Radars in 1965: SPS-23, SPS-29A; Sonar in 1965: SQS-1
- Armament: In 1965: one single 5-inch (127 mm) 38-caliber gun

USS Coos Bay (AVP-25) was a United States Navy Barnegat-class small seaplane tender in commission from 1943 to 1946 that saw service during the latter half of World War II. After the war, she was in commission in the United States Coast Guard from 1949 to 1966 as the cutter USCGC Coos Bay (WAVP-376), later WHEC-376.

== Construction and commissioning ==
Coos Bay (AVP-25) was laid down on 15 August 1941 by Lake Washington Shipyards, Houghton, Washington, and was launched on 15 May 1942, sponsored by Mrs. L. E. Geheres. She was commissioned on 15 May 1943.

== United States Navy service ==
=== World War II ===
Coos Bay cleared San Diego, California on 22 July 1943 for Pearl Harbor, Hawaii, Espiritu Santo, and Cavutu, where she established a seadrome for Patrol Squadron 71 (VP-71) from 13 October 1943 until 23 November 1943. She was based successively at Tulagi, at Blanche Harbor in the Treasury Islands, and at Green Island until 16 June 1944.

After carrying men and equipment of Fleet Air Wing 1 (FAW-1) from New Georgia to Espiritu Santo, Coos Bay sailed on 21 August 1944 for Guadalcanal, where she unloaded aviation equipment. From 8 September 1944 to 9 December 1944 she served at Saipan as station tender, then returned to San Pedro, California, for an overhaul.

Coos Bay returned to Pearl Harbor on 17 March 1945. On 21 March 1945 she departed for Ulithi Atoll. During her passage, on 31 March 1945, she collided with the oceangoing commercial tug M/V Matagorda, which took her in tow for emergency repairs at Eniwetok. Coos Bay proceeded to San Pedro for repairs and overhaul. Returning to Pearl Harbor, Coos Bay remained there until 1 September 1945. Meanwhile, hostilities with Japan ended on 15 August 1945.

==== Honors and awards ====
Coos Bay received two battle stars for World War II service.

=== Post-World War II ===
On 1 September 1945, Coos Bay departed Pearl Harbor for Ominato Ko, Honshū, Japan. The formal Japanese surrender to the Allies took place aboard the battleship USS Missouri (BB-63) in Tokyo Bay the following day. Arriving at Ominato Ko on 13 September 1945 for station tender duty, Coos Bay remained there until 2 December 1945, when she proceeded to Orange, Texas, where she arrived on 11 January 1946 for inactivation.

=== Decommissioning ===
Coos Bay was decommissioned and placed in reserve in the Atlantic Reserve Fleet at Orange on 30 April 1946.

== United States Coast Guard service ==
Barnegat-class ships were very reliable and seaworthy and had good habitability, and the Coast Guard viewed them as ideal for ocean station duty, in which they would perform weather reporting and search and rescue tasks, once they were modified by having a balloon shelter added aft and having oceanographic equipment, an oceanographic winch, and a hydrographic winch installed. After World War II, the U.S. Navy transferred 18 of the ships to the Coast Guard, in which they were known as the Casco-class cutters.

The Navy loaned Coos Bay to the Coast Guard on 4 January 1949. After she underwent conversion for service as a weather-reporting ship, the Coast Guard commissioned her as USCGC Coos Bay (WAVP-376) in May 1949.

=== Service history ===
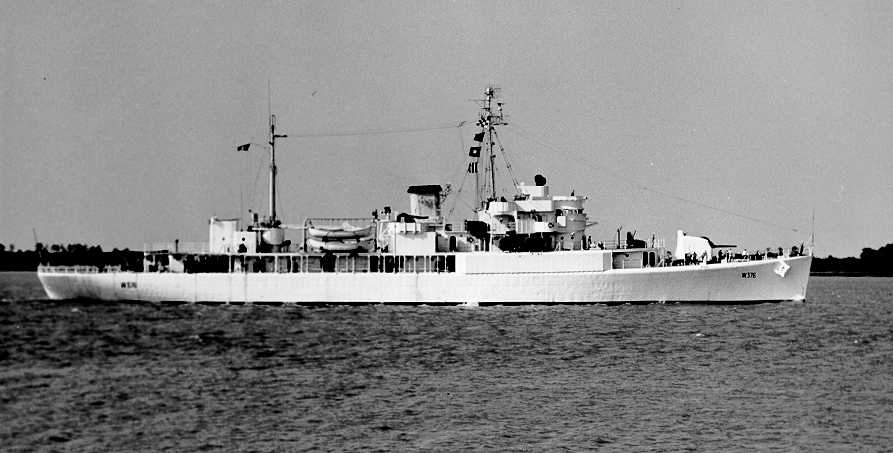
USCGC Coos Bay (WAVP-376, later WHEC-376) sometime between 1949 and the U.S. Coast Guard's 1967 adoption of the "racing stripe" markings on its ships.

Coos Bay was stationed at Portland, Maine, throughout her Coast Guard career. Her primary duty was to serve on ocean stations in the Atlantic Ocean to gather meteorological data. While on duty in one of these stations, she was required to patrol a 210-square-mile (544-square-kilometer) area for three weeks at a time, leaving the area only when physically relieved by another Coast Guard cutter or in the case of a dire emergency. While on station, she acted as an aircraft check point at the point of no return, a relay point for messages from ships and aircraft, as a source of the latest weather information for passing aircraft, as a floating oceanographic laboratory, and as a search-and-rescue ship for downed aircraft and vessels in distress, and she engaged in law enforcement operations.

Coos Bay rescued the 10-man crew of a downed U.S. Navy patrol aircraft midway between Bermuda and the Azores on 27 February 1953. On 11 March 1953 she assisted the commercial tanker Angy.

On 26 January 1955, Coos Bay rescued six crewmen of a downed United States Air Force transport aircraft about 1,000 nautical miles (1,900 km) east of Bermuda.

In December 1960, Coos Bay rescued four inexperienced seamen aboard the Lamont Geological Observatory research vessel Grace about 104 nautical miles (193 km) southwest of Bermuda. Grace was towed back to Bermuda in heavy seas.

On 19 February 1964, Coos Bay rescued survivors from the British merchant ship Ambassador in the North Atlantic.

Coos Bay was reclassified as a high endurance cutter and redesignated WHEC-376 on 1 May 1966.

== Decommissioning and disposal ==
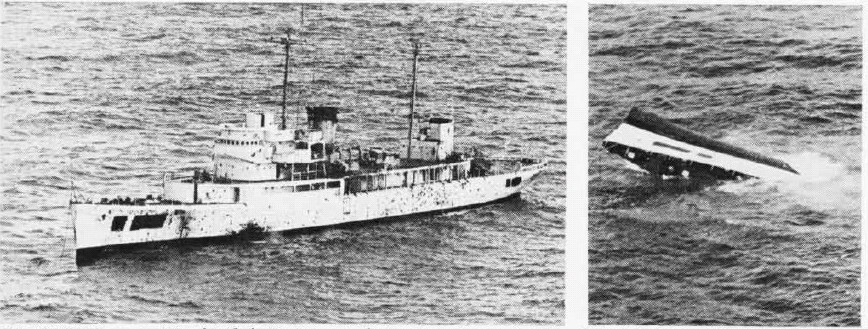
Coos Bay being sunk as a target off Virginia on 9 January 1968.

The Coast Guard decommissioned Coos Bay on 1 September 1966, and berthed her at Curtis Bay in Baltimore, Maryland. The Coast Guard returned her to the U.S. Navy on 2 September 1967.

Coos Bay was struck from the Naval Register. The Navy towed her from Curtis Bay to a point 120 nautical miles (220 km) off the coast of Virginia, where on 9 January 1968 the guided missile destroyer USS Claude V. Ricketts (DDG-5), one other Navy ship, and 35 aircraft sank her as a target.
