= USS Absecon (AVP-23) =

Tender of the United States Navy

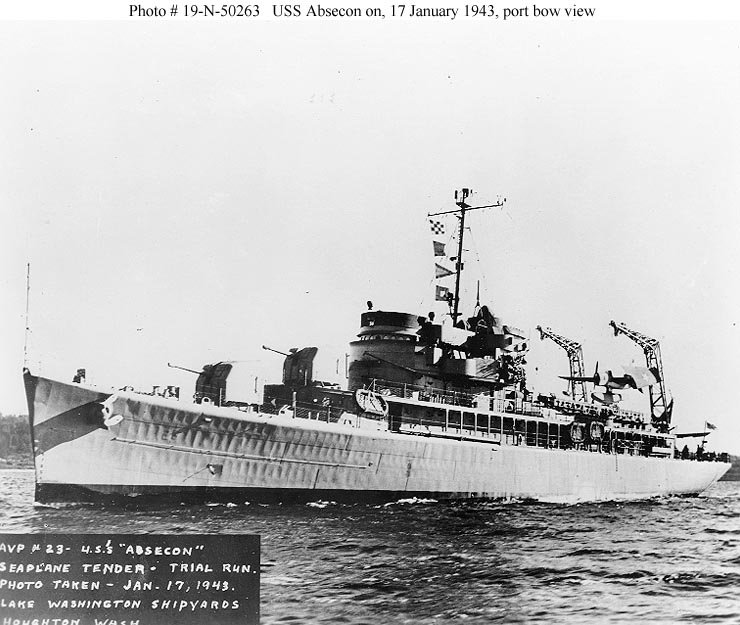
- USS Absecon (AVP-23) off Houghton, Washington on 17 January 1943, six days before commissioning, with a Curtiss SO3C Seamew floatplane on her catapult

History

United States
- Name: USS Absecon (AVP-23)
- Namesake: Absecon Inlet in New Jersey
- Builder: Lake Washington Shipyard, Houghton, Washington,
- Laid down: 23 July 1941
- Launched: 8 March 1942
- Sponsored by: Mrs. Robert L. Moon, Jr.
- Commissioned: 23 January 1943
- Decommissioned: 19 March 1947
- Fate: Loaned to U.S. Coast Guard 5 January 1949; Permanently transferred to Coast Guard 26 September 1966
- Acquired: Transferred from U.S. Coast Guard 9 May 1972
- Fate: Transferred to South Vietnam 15 June 1972

United States Coast Guard
- Name: USCGC Absecon (WAVP-374)
- Namesake: Previous name retained
- Acquired: Loaned by U.S. Navy to Coast Guard 5 January 1949; Transferred permanently from Navy to Coast Guard 26 September 1966
- Commissioned: May 1949
- Reclassified: High endurance cutter (WHEC-374) 1 May 1966
- Decommissioned: 9 May 1972
- Fate: Transferred to U.S. Navy 9 May 1972

South Vietnam
- Name: RVNS Pham Ngu Lao (HQ-15)
- Namesake: Phạm Ngũ Lão, 13th-century Trần dynasty general
- Acquired: 15 July 1972
- Commissioned: 1972
- Captured: By North Vietnam May 1975

Vietnam
- Name: PRVSN Pham Ngu Lao (HQ-01)
- Namesake: Previous name retained
- Acquired: May 1975
- Status: Unknown; active into 1990s and perhaps until at least 2000; later inactive and probably decommissioned

General characteristics (catapult training ship)
- Class & type: Barnegat-class catapult training ship
- Displacement: 1,766 long tons (1,794 t) (light); 2,750 long tons (2,790 t) (full load)
- Length: 310 ft 9 in (94.72 m)
- Beam: 41 ft 1 in (12.52 m)
- Draft: 13 ft 6 in (4.11 m)
- Installed power: 6,000 horsepower (4.48 megawatts)
- Propulsion: Diesel engines, two shafts
- Speed: 18.6 knots (34.4 km/h)
- Complement: 215 (ship's company); 367 (including aviation unit)
- Sensors & processing systems: Radar; sonar
- Armament: 2 × single 5 in (130 mm) 38-caliber dual-purpose gun mounts; 4 × 20-mm antiaircraft guns; 2 × depth charge tracks
- Aircraft carried: Up to 3 floatplanes
- Aviation facilities: One catapult and aircraft handling cranes
- Notes: Converted during construction into a catapult training ship

General characteristics (Coast Guard cutter)
- Class & type: Casco-class cutter
- Displacement: 2,610 tons (full load) in 1970
- Length: 311 ft 7 in (94.97 m) overall; 299 ft 11 in (91.41 m) between perpendiculars
- Beam: 41 ft 0.75 in (12.5159 m) maximum
- Draft: 13 ft 1 in (3.99 m) maximum in 1964
- Installed power: 6,080 bhp (4,530 kW)
- Propulsion: Fairbanks-Morse geared diesel engines, two shafts; 166,430 US gallons (630,000 L) of fuel
- Speed: 17.3 knots (32.0 km/h) (maximum sustained in 1966); 10.0 knots (18.5 km/h) (economic)
- Range: 10,138 nautical miles (18,776 km) at 17.3 knots (32.0 km/h) in 1966; 20,000 nautical miles (37,000 km) at 10.0 knots (18.5 km/h) in 1966
- Complement: 151 (10 officers, 3 warrant officers, 138 enlisted personnel) in 1964
- Sensors & processing systems: Radars in 1964: SPS-23, SPS-29B; Sonar in 1964: SQS-1
- Armament: In 1970: one single 5-inch (127 mm) 38-caliber gun, 1 x Mark 52.3 director, 1 x Mark 26-4 fire-control radar, 6 x .50-caliber (12.7-millimeter) machine guns; All antisubmarine weapons (previously 1 x Mark 10 Mod 0 antisubmarine projector, 2 x Mark 32 Mod 2 torpedo tubes) had been removed by 1970

General characteristics (South Vietnamese frigate)
- Class & type: Tran Quang Khai-class frigate
- Displacement: 1,766 tons (standard); 2,800 tons (full load)
- Length: 310 ft 9 in (94.72 m) (overall); 300 ft 0 in (91.44 m) waterline
- Beam: 41 ft 1 in (12.52 m)
- Draft: 13 ft 5 in (4.09 m)
- Installed power: 6,080 horsepower (4.54 megawatts)
- Propulsion: 2 x Fairbanks Morse 38D diesel engines
- Speed: approximately 18 knots (maximum)
- Complement: approximately 200
- Armament: 4 × 5-inch/38-caliber (127-millimeter) dual-purpose gun; 1 or 2 x 81-millimeter mortars in some ships; Several M2 machine guns

General characteristics (Vietnamese People's Navy)
- Type: Patrol vessel
- Displacement: 1,766 tons (standard); 2,800 tons (full load)
- Length: 310 ft 8 in (94.69 m)
- Beam: 41 ft 1 in (12.52 m)
- Draft: 13 ft 5 in (4.09 m)
- Installed power: 6,080 horsepower (4.54 megawatts) maximum; 3,540 horsepower (2.64 megawatts) sustained
- Propulsion: 2 x Fairbanks-Morse 38D8-1/8-10 diesel engines, 2 shafts
- Speed: approximately 18 knots (maximum)
- Range: 20,000 nautical miles (37,040 kilometers) at 12 knots
- Complement: approximately 200
- Sensors & processing systems: Raytheon SPS-21 surface-search radar; RCA/GE Mark 26 fire-control radar
- Armament: When captured in 1975: 1 × U.S. Navy 5-inch/38-caliber (127-millimeter) dual-purpose gun; 2 × United States 81-mm mortars; Several U.S. machine guns; Added in mid-1980s: 2 × Soviet SS-N-2 "Styx" anti-ship cruise missile launchers (aft); 2 × Soviet quad SA-N-5 "Grail" surface-to-air-missile launchers; 3 × Soviet 37-mm/63-caliber guns; 2 × Soviet twin 20-mm gun mounts; All missile armament probably removed in 1990s

The second USS Absecon (AVP-23) was a United States Navy Barnegat-class seaplane tender in commission from 1943 to 1947, converted during construction to serve as a catapult training ship during World War II. The ship was in commission in the United States Coast Guard as the cutter USCGC Absecon (WAVP-374), later WHEC-374, from 1949 to 1972. Transferred to South Vietnam in 1972, she served in the Republic of Vietnam Navy as the frigate RVNS Pham Ngu Lao (HQ-15) until she was captured by North Vietnam at the conclusion of the Vietnam War in 1975. After that, she served in the Socialist Republic of Vietnam's Vietnam People's Navy as PRVSN Pham Ngu Lao (HQ-01).

== Construction and commissioning ==
Absecon was laid down on 23 July 1941 at Houghton, Washington, by Lake Washington Shipyard. She was launched on 8 March 1942, sponsored by Mrs. Robert L. Moon Jr., the daughter of Captain G. E. Davis – who was then the chief of staff to the Commandant of the 13th Naval District – and the wife of Commander Robert L. Moon Jr.. Absecon was unique among the Barnegat-class ships in that she was the only one fitted with an aircraft catapult and cranes for handling floatplanes. Her redesign from the standard seaplane tender configuration resulted from the U.S. Navy's need for pilots to gain experience needed to qualify for catapult operations in battleship- and cruiser-based floatplane aviation units. Absecon was converted to this configuration during construction. She commissioned at the Puget Sound Navy Yard at Bermerton, Washington, on 28 January 1943 and completed her fitting out period on 14 February 1943

== United States Navy service ==
=== World War II ===
Absecon was assigned the duty of providing aviator training for catapulting and sled net recovery of floatplanes while underway. She commenced her shakedown cruise on 15 February 1943, her aircraft complement consisting of one SO3C Seamew and a pair of OS2U Kingfishers.

On her way from the Pacific Ocean to the Atlantic Ocean via the Panama Canal, Absecon picked up seven survivors from SS Olancho, a freighter which had been torpedoed by a German submarine.

From March to September 1943, Absecon operated out of the Naval Section Base at Mayport, Florida, coordinating observation-plane pilot training and serving as a target for practice torpedo runs. On 16 April 1943, she struck a submerged wreck that caused considerable damage to her hull. Following repairs, she resumed her duties.

In September 1943, Absecon was shifted to operate from Port Everglades, Florida. She carried out her training activities there into the winter of 1943–1944. One event highlighted her service during this period: On 13 November 1943, while serving as a target ship for torpedo bombers, Absecon observed a small freighter, SS Franklin Baker, flying distress signals. Absecon initially attempted to tow Franklin Baker to shore. When it became apparent that Franklin Baker would not move even under tow and was a navigational hazard, Absecon took her crew on board and attempted to sink her. Two depth charges and eighteen 5-inch (127-millimeter) projectiles failed to sink the freighter. The United States Coast Guard assisted in the effort to sink Franklin Baker, eventually succeeding by setting demolition charges on board her.

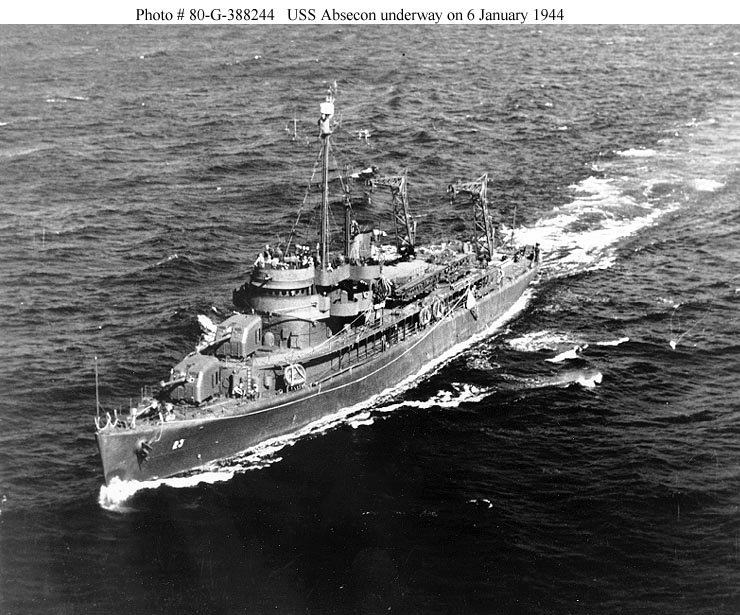
USS Absecon off Fort Lauderdale, Florida, on 6 January 1944.

During 1944, Absecon conducted 1,394 catapult launchings and a corresponding number of recoveries and qualified 211 pilots, thus averaging approximately 116 launches per month with 18 pilots a month qualifying for the operation of cruiser and battleship-based floatplanes such as the SO3C Seamew, the OS2U Kingfisher, the SOC Seagull, and the SC Seahawk. Her peak month of operations was November 1944, when she conducted 279 launchings and qualified 58 aviators.

In addition to this duty, she continued to serve as a mobile target for torpedo planes. Shallow-running exercise torpedoes struck Absecon four times during 1944: on 30 January 1944, on 24 June 1944, on 19 August 1944, and on 31 October 1944. The first hit flooded two compartments, the third caused flooding in the forward engine room, and the last caused a small rupture in the shell plating.

Between 17 October 1944 and 20 October 1944, Absecon was caught in a hurricane while moored in Mayport. After sending her aircraft inland, she rode out the storm, experiencing winds of up to 100 knots (115 miles per hour or 190 kilometers per hour).

Absecon assisted the fishing boat Chip on 6 February 1945. She was again hit by an exercise torpedo on 19 February 1945 and was forced to enter dry dock at the Charleston Navy Yard in Charleston, South Carolina, to repair her starboard propeller.

On five occasions during 1945, aircraft capsized during recovery operations. All resulted in the salvage of the aircraft involved except the last, on 4 August 1945. On that occasion she sank the plane, apparently damaged beyond repair, with gunfire.

Absecon was based at Port Everglades until mid-July 1945, when she shifted to Pensacola, Florida, for duty involving training and logistical support of the observation aircraft operations there. Absecon carried out this training through the end of World War II on 15 August 1945 and into September 1945. During those nine months, she conducted 1,839 catapult launches, an average of 204 per month, and qualified 274 pilots. Her peak production of pilots occurred in March 1945 when she qualified 45, and her peak number of launches occurred during August 1945, when she conducted 340.

=== Post-World War II ===
As the helicopter began to supplant cruiser- and battleship-based seaplanes, the need for qualifying pilots of floatplanes diminished accordingly. After a period as a training ship based at Pensacola, Absecon was decommissioned on 19 March 1947 and placed in reserve, laid up in the Atlantic Reserve Fleet in Orange, Texas.

== United States Coast Guard service ==
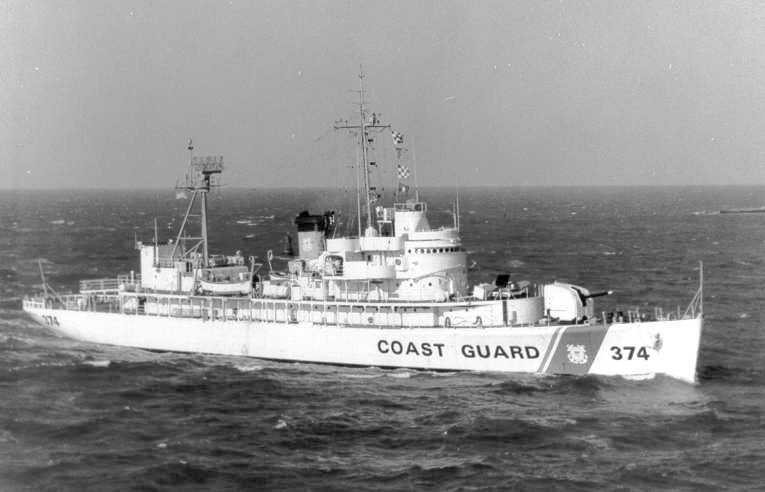
USCGC Absecon (WHEC-374) on 27 December 1969.

Barnegat-class ships were very reliable and seaworthy and had good habitability, and the United States Coast Guard viewed them as ideal for ocean station duty, in which they would perform weather reporting and search and rescue tasks, once they were modified by having a balloon shelter added aft and having oceanographic equipment, an oceanographic winch, and a hydrographic winch installed. After World War II, the U.S. Navy transferred 18 of the ships to the Coast Guard, in which they were known as the Casco-class cutters.

The U.S. Navy loaned Absecon to the Coast Guard on 4 January 1949. After she underwent conversion for service as a weather reporting ship, the Coast Guard commissioned her as USCGC Absecon (WAVP-374) in May 1949.

=== Service history ===
Absecon was stationed at Norfolk, Virginia, throughout her Coast Guard career. Her primary duty was to serve on ocean stations in the Atlantic Ocean to gather meteorological data. While on duty in one of these stations, she was required to patrol a 210-square-mile (544-square-kilometer) area for three weeks at a time, leaving the area only when physically relieved by another Coast Guard cutter or in the case of a dire emergency. While on station, she acted as an aircraft check point at the point of no return, a relay point for messages from ships and aircraft, as a source of the latest weather information for passing aircraft, as a floating oceanographic laboratory, and as a search-and-rescue ship for downed aircraft and vessels in distress, and engaged in law enforcement operations.

During the 1950s, Absecon frequently visited Naval Station Argentia, Newfoundland, and Bermuda between stints on patrol on the high seas in the North and central Atlantic Ocean and periods of regular upkeep at Norfolk. On 5 March 1955, Absecon provided medical assistance to a cadet aboard the Swedish training schooner HMS Falken en route to Bermuda.

On 21 September 1957, Absecon, on her ocean station in the central Atlantic, picked up a distress call from the West German four-masted steel-hulled bark Pamir. The square rigger, homeward bound from Buenos Aires, Argentina, with a cargo of barley and with 86 men (52 teen-aged cadets among them) on board, had run into Hurricane Carrie and been battered severely by the vicious storm, ultimately sinking. Absecon altered course immediately and stood toward Pamir's last position. Arriving on the scene on 22 September 1957, Absecon immediately began sweeping the stormy sea for signs of life, aided by Portuguese Air Force and United States Air Force planes from the Azores and U.S. Navy planes from Bermuda. Sixty ships, representing 13 nations, searched for survivors for one week, with Absecon coordinating their efforts. Ultimately, six survivors – four crewman and two cadets – were recovered; the American merchant ship Saxon rescued five men on 24 September 1957, three days after Pamir had sunk, while Absecon found Pamir's last survivor, 22-year-old Günter Haselbach, on 25 September 1957. The other 80 men and boys had perished.

In 1958, Absecon made a cruise to Europe, visiting Hamburg, West Germany; Amsterdam, the Netherlands; Dublin, Ireland; and Lisbon, Portugal, before returning, via Bermuda, to the United States East Coast.

In 1960 and again in 1962, Absecon participated in a Coast Guard cadet practice cruise to Canada, Europe, and Bermuda. She was damaged by heavy seas on 7 March 1962 while putting to sea from Norfolk to assist merchant ships during a storm.

From 20 through 23 July 1963, Absecon stood by the disabled merchant ship Seven Seas in the mid-Atlantic and escorted the ship to St. John's, Newfoundland, Canada.

On 13 September 1963, Absecon rescued the third engineer of the West German merchant ship Freiberg midway between Bermuda and the Azores after he had fallen overboard and remained in the water for 17 hours.

In February 1966, Absecon stood by the disabled British merchant ship Parthia while waiting for a commercial tug.

Absecon was reclassified as a high endurance cutter and redesignated WHEC-374 on 1 May 1966.

On 13 November 1969, Absecon evacuated a crewman of the merchant ship Morgenstern in need of medical assistance while Morgenstern was in the mid-Atlantic.

In late 1971, while battling seas over 30 feet (9.1 meters) in height on Ocean Station Charlie in the North Atlantic, Absecon narrowly escaped capsizing when she was hammered by a rogue wave estimated at 50 feet (15 meters) in height that rolled her 32.5 degrees, only one-half-degree short of her rollover point.

Early in 1972, Absecon was called to conduct a search and rescue action while on Ocean Station Bravo when a U.S. Navy pilot went down while on a training mission off the Virginia coast. She recovered only a life jacket from the ocean, and the pilot and the wreckage of his plane were never found.

=== Decommissioning and transfer to South Vietnam ===
In April 1972, Absecon and two of her sister ships, the Coast Guard cutters USCGC Chincoteague and USCGC McCulloch, were deployed as Coast Guard Squadron Two, with crews composed mainly of members of the United States Coast Guard Reserve. They were originally scheduled to sail to Subic Bay in the Philippine Islands, but were diverted to the U.S. Navy base at Apra Harbor, Guam. The Coast Guard decommissioned the three cutters and transferred them to the U.S. Navy, these events both occurring for Absecon on 9 May 1972. After her antisubmarine warfare equipment had been removed, she was transferred to South Vietnam on 15 June 1972.

== Republic of Vietnam Navy service ==
South Vietnam commissioned the former Absecon into the Republic of Vietnam Navy as the frigate RVNS Pham Ngu Lao (HQ-15) She was the last of seven former Casco-class cutters transferred to South Vietnam in 1971 and 1972. Known in South Vietnam as the Tran Quang Khai-class frigates, they were the largest warships in the South Vietnamese inventory, and their 5-inch (127-millimeter) guns were South Vietnam's largest naval guns. Pham Ngu Lao and her sisters fought alongside U.S. Navy ships during the final years of the Vietnam War, patrolling the South Vietnamese coast and providing gunfire support to South Vietnamese forces ashore.

South Vietnam collapsed in late April 1975, bringing the Vietnam War to an end. Although all six of her sister ships fled to the Philippines, Pham Ngu Lao remained behind and was captured by North Vietnam in May 1975.

== Vietnam People's Navy service ==
Pham Ngu Lao was commissioned into the Vietnam People's Navy of the now-unified Socialist Republic of Vietnam as the patrol vessel PRVSN Pham Ngu Lao (HQ-01).

=== Modifications ===
When captured, Pham Ngu Lao was armed with the American weaponry that South Vietnam had relied upon. The Vietnam People's Navy appears to have retained its major components, such as the 5-inch 38-caliber (127-millimeter) gun and 81-mm mortars. In the mid-1980s, Soviet-made 37-mm and 25-mm guns were installed for close-in defense, as were two Soviet-made SS-N-2 (NATO reporting name "Styx") anti-ship cruise missile launchers and two Soviet-made quad SA-N-5 (NATO reporting name "Grail") surface-to-air-missile launchers. However, all the missile launchers are thought to have been removed in the 1990s.

=== Service history ===
On 10 January 1979, Pham Ngu Lao joined the Vietnam People′s Navy patrol boats HQ-03, T-197, T-199, T-203 and T-205 in an action off Ream, Cambodia, that resulted in the sinking of two Cambodian warships.

Pham Ngu Lao's status in the secretive Vietnam People's Navy is murky, but she was thought to be in active service into the 1990s and perhaps as recently as 2000. By the early-to-mid-2000s she apparently was inactive and may have been decommissioned.
