= USS Rockaway =

Tender of the United States Navy

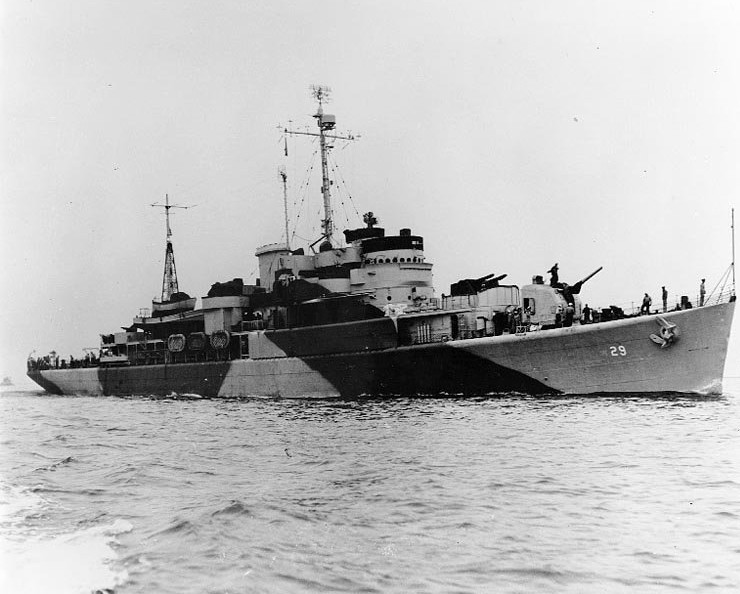
- Rockaway (AVP-29) on 6 October 1944, shortly after her main armament was reduced to a single 5-inch (127 mm) 38-caliber gun

History

United States
- Name: USS Rockaway (AVP-29)
- Namesake: Rockaway Inlet, on the southwestern coast of Long Island, New York, at the entrance to New York Bay
- Builder: Associated Shipbuilders, Inc., Seattle, Washington
- Laid down: 30 June 1941
- Launched: 14 February 1942
- Sponsored by: Mrs. Z. E. Briggs
- Commissioned: 6 January 1943
- Reclassified: Miscellaneous auxiliary (as press information ship), AG-123, 30 July 1945; Small seaplane tender, AVP-29, 26 October 1945
- Stricken: 26 September 1966
- Honors and awards: One battle star for World War II service
- Fate: Loaned to U.S. Coast Guard 24 December 1948; Transferred permanently to Coast Guard 26 September 1966

United States
- Name: USCGC Rockaway (WAVP-377)
- Namesake: Previous name retained
- Acquired: Loaned by United States Navy to U.S. Coast Guard 24 December 1948; Transferred permanently from U.S. Navy to U.S. Coast Guard 26 September 1966
- Commissioned: 10 January 1949
- Reclassified: Oceanographic vessel (WAGO-377) 1965
- Reclassified: High endurance cutter (WHEC-377) 1 May 1966
- Reclassified: Offshore law enforcement vessel (WOLE-377) 23 September 1971
- Decommissioned: 29 January 1972
- Nickname(s): "The Rock"; "Lobster Patrol"
- Fate: Sold for scrapping 21 October 1972

General characteristics (seaplane tender)
- Class & type: Barnegat-class small seaplane tender
- Type: Seaplane tender 1943-1945; Press information ship 1945; Seaplane tender 1945-1948
- Displacement: 1,766 tons (light); 2,750 ons (full load)
- Length: 311 ft 8 in (95.00 m)
- Beam: 41 ft 1 in (12.52 m)
- Draft: 13 ft 6 in (4.11 m)
- Installed power: 6,080 horsepower (4.54 megawatts)
- Propulsion: Fairbanks-Morse, direct reversing diesel engines; two shafts
- Speed: 18.6 knots (34.4 km/h)
- Complement: 215 (ship's company); 367 (including aviation unit)
- Armament: 1 × single 5-inch (127 mm) 38-caliber dual-purpose gun mount; 1 × quad 40-mm antiaircraft gun mount; 2 × dual 40-mm antiaircraft gun mounts; 4 dual × 20-mm antiaircraft gun mounts; 2 × depth charge tracks
- Aviation facilities: Supplies, spare parts, repairs, and berthing for one seaplane squadron; 80,000 US gallons (300,000 L) aviation fuel

General characteristics (Coast Guard cutter)
- Class & type: Casco-class cutter
- Displacement: 2,390 tons (full load) in 1967
- Length: 310 ft 7.75 in (94.6849 m) overall; 300 ft 0 in (91.44 m) between perpendiculars
- Beam: 41 ft 2.375 in (12.55713 m) maximum
- Draft: 13 ft 1 in (3.99 m) maximum aft at full load in 1967
- Installed power: 6,080 bhp (4,530 kW)
- Propulsion: Fairbanks-Morse direct-reversing diesel engines, two shafts; 166,430 US gallons (630,000 L) of fuel
- Speed: 18.2 knots (33.7 km/h) (maximum sustained) in 1967; 13.2 knots (24.4 km/h) (economic) in 1967
- Range: 9,902 nautical miles (18,339 km) at 18.2 knots (33.7 km/h) in 1967; 18,289 nautical miles (33,871 km) at 13.2 knots (24.4 km/h) in 1967
- Complement: In 1967: 151 (10 officers, 3 warrant officers, 138 enlisted personnel)
- Sensors & processing systems: Radars in 1967 (one each): SPS-23, SPS-29D; Sonar in 1967: SQS-1
- Armament: In 1967: 2 x 81-millimeter Mark 2 mortars; 2 × .50-caliber (12.7 mm) Mark 2 machine guns; 2 × Mark 32 Mod 5 antisubmarine projectors

USS Rockaway (AVP-29), later AG-123, was a United States Navy Barnegat-class seaplane tender in commission from 1943 to 1946. She served in both the Atlantic Ocean and the Pacific Ocean during World War II. In 1948, she was loaned to the United States Coast Guard, in which she served as the cutter USCGC Rockaway (WAVP-377), later WAGO-377, WHEC-377, and WOLE-377, from 1949 to 1972.

== Construction and commissioning ==
Rockaway was laid down on 30 June 1941 by Associated Shipbuilders, Inc., at Seattle, Washington. She was launched on 14 February 1942, sponsored by Mrs. Z. E. Briggs, and commissioned on 6 January 1943.

== United States Navy service ==
=== World War II ===
Following shakedown, Rockaway became a unit of the United States Atlantic Fleet in April 1943 with her home base at Norfolk, Virginia.

==== Transatlantic voyages and North African service ====
From April 1943 until October 1944, Rockaway delivered supplies and personnel to outlying bases in the North Atlantic Ocean. She transferred a complete seaplane squadron from Newfoundland to England, carried aviation cargo from Norfolk to the aircraft carrier USS Ranger (CV-4) at Scapa Flow in the Orkney Islands, delivered secret radar equipment to England to be used in the invasion of Normandy of 6 June 1944, performed guard ship duty at Casablanca, French Morocco, for two months, and transported aircraft engines to the Azores.

Rockaway completed nine round trips across the Atlantic during this interval, steaming independently. On several occasions, she made submarine contacts and dropped depth charges, but with undetermined results.

==== Invasion of France ====
During the invasion of Normandy in June 1944, Rockaway performed sundry duties for 20 days, including patrol and convoy work in the English Channel; flagship duty for Admiral J. Wilkes, USN; transportation of United States Army and U.S. Navy personnel; and protection of Allied beachheads against German air attacks.

==== Operations from the Panama Canal Zone ====
After a shipyard period in November 1944, Rockaway was based in the Panama Canal Zone, completing two trips to the Galapagos Islands with aviation supplies and personnel. In December 1944 she rescued 13 survivors from a PBM Mariner flying boat which had crashed in the Pacific Ocean off Coco Solo, Panama.

==== Operations in Brazil ====
Rockaway operated from Brazil from February 1945 to July 1945, supplying the various naval bases from Belém to Bahia, Brazil, with men and equipment. While steaming to Recife, Brazil, on 21 February 1945, Rockaway, located a disabled tanker and guarded the tanker for three days until a fleet tug arrived on the scene to take the tanker under tow.

==== Conversion to press information ship begun ====
In July 1945, Rockaway began conversion at the Boston Navy Yard in Boston, Massachusetts, into a press information ship. Reclassified as a miscellaneous auxiliary and redesignated AG-123 on 30 July 1945, her conversion was designed to allow her to carry 50 correspondents during the invasion of Japan, which was scheduled for 1945–1946. After hostilities with Japan ended on 15 August 1945 before an invasion could occur, she was reconverted into a seaplane tender.

==== Honors and awards ====
Rockaway received one battle star for her World War II service.

=== Post-World War II ===
Rockaway departed Boston, Massachusetts, on 26 October 1945. She reported to the Inactive Fleet at Orange, Texas, on 12 November 1945. Decommissioned there on 21 March 1946, Rockaway was placed in reserve and berthed in the Atlantic Reserve Fleet at Orange.

== United States Coast Guard service ==
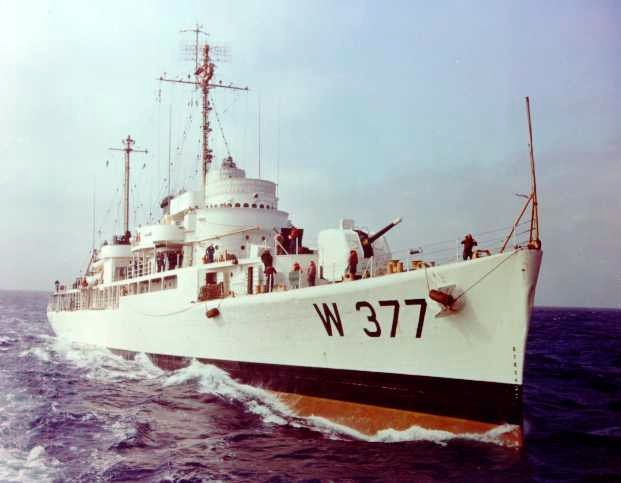
USCGC Rockaway (WAVP-377, later WAGO-377, WHEC-377, and WOLE-377), sometime prior to the U.S. Coast Guard's 1967 adoption of the "racing stripe" markings on its ships.

Barnegat-class ships were very reliable and seaworthy and had good habitability, and the Coast Guard viewed them as ideal for ocean station duty, in which they would perform weather reporting and search and rescue tasks, once they were modified by having a balloon shelter added aft and having oceanographic equipment, an oceanographic winch, and a hydrographic winch installed. After World War II, the Navy transferred 18 of the ships to the Coast Guard, in which they were known as the Casco-class cutters.

The U.S. Navy loaned Rockaway to the Coast Guard on 24 December 1948. After undergoing conversion for use as a weather-reporting ship, she was commissioned into the Coast Guard service as the cutter USCGC Rockaway (WAVP-377) on 10 January 1949.

=== Service history ===
Rockaway was stationed at Governors Island in New York City, which remained her home port throughout her Coast Guard career. Her primary duty was to serve on ocean stations in the Atlantic Ocean to gather meteorological data. While on duty in one of these stations, she was required to patrol a 210-square-mile (544-square-kilometer) area for three weeks at a time, leaving the area only when physically relieved by another Coast Guard cutter or in the case of a dire emergency. While on station, she acted as an aircraft check point at the point of no return, a relay point for messages from ships and aircraft, as a source of the latest weather information for passing aircraft, as a floating oceanographic laboratory, and as a search-and-rescue ship for downed aircraft and vessels in distress, and engaged in law enforcement operations.

In September 1958, Rockaway salvaged a U.S. Navy seaplane 180 nautical miles (330 km) from Bermuda. In December 1964, she rescued four people from the merchant ship Smith Voyager.

Rockaway was reclassified as an "oceanographic ship" and redesignated as WAGO-377 in 1965. She took part in a United States Coast Guard Academy cadet cruise in August 1965.

On 24 February 1966, Rockaway stood by the British merchant ship Parthia until a commercial tug arrived to assist Parthia.

On 1 May 1966, Rockaway again was reclassified, this time as a high endurance cutter, and was redesignated WHEC-377. On 26 September 1966 her period on loan to the Coast Guard ended when she was stricken from the Naval Vessel Register and transferred permanently to the Coast Guard.

From 20 January 1967 to 30 March 1967, Rockaway conducted an "Eastern Tropical Pacific Cruise" in the Pacific off Mexico, where she undertook an oceanographic survey. From November 1967 through January 1968, she conducted an oceanographic survey off Norfolk, Virginia. She was involved in more oceanographic surveys over the Mid-Atlantic Shelf from 6 May 1968 to 12 May 1968 and again from 11 July 1968 to 18 July 1968.

From 14 January 1969 to 19 January 1969, she conducted a survival craft drift project 159 nautical miles (294 km) east of the Chesapeake Bay. In August 1969, she conducted extensive oceanographic work associated with the Barbados Oceanographic and Meteorological Experiment. She then conducted more oceanographic surveys from Nova Scotia, Canada, to Cape Hatteras, North Carolina, from 20 October 1969 to 23 November 1969, over the Mid-Atlantic Outer Continental Margin from 30 March 1970 to 5 April 1970, from Nova Scotia to Cape Hatteras between 19 May 1970 and 14 June 1970, and near the Grand Banks of Newfoundland between 6 October 1970 and 21 October 1970. In November 1970, she surveyed a nerve gas dump site.

Rockaway conducted a fisheries research cruise from Nova Scotia to Cape Hatteras between 2 March 1971 and 3 April 1971. Another research cruise took her back to the Grand Banks of Newfoundland in May 1971. From 15 July 1971 to 18 September 1971, she studied the influence of Mediterranean effluent upon the Atlantic Ocean.

On 23 September 1971, Rockaway was once again reclassified, this time as an "off-shore law enforcement vessel," and was redesignated WOLE-377. Her main mission was to track the locations of the Russian and Japanese fishing fleets that were at that time depleting the fishing areas off the North Atlantic coast of North America. As a byproduct of this mission, Rockaway also conducted search and rescue missions that got her the nickname "Lobster Patrol".

=== Decommissioning and disposal ===
Rockaway was decommissioned on 29 January 1972 She was sold for scrapping on 21 October 1972 to BV Intershift of Rotterdam, the Netherlands.
