= Casco-class cutter =

Class of United States Coast Guard cutter

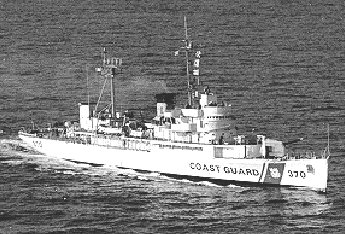
- USCGC Casco (WHEC-370. ex-WAVP-370) in 1969.

Class overview
- Name: Casco
- Builders: Puget Sound Navy Yard, Bremerton, Washington (3 ships); Boston Navy Yard, Boston, Massachusetts (2 ships); Lake Washington Shipyard, Houghton, Washington (10 ships); Associated Shipbuilders, Inc., Seattle, Washington (3 ships)
- Built: October 1939-November 1944
- In commission: September 1946-April 1988
- Completed: 18
- Lost: 0
- Retired: 18
- Preserved: 0

General characteristics
- Class & type: Casco class cutter
- Displacement: 2,040 tons standard; 2,551 tons full load
- Length: 310 ft 9 in (94.72 m) overall; 300 ft 0 in (91.44 m) (waterline)
- Beam: 41 ft 1 in (12.52 m)
- Draft: 12 ft 5 in (3.78 m) full
- Installed power: 6,000 to 6,080 horsepower (4.48 to 4.54 MW)
- Propulsion: Diesel engine, two shafts
- Speed: 18 knots (33 km/h; 21 mph)
- Range: 20,000 nmi (37,000 km; 23,000 mi) at 12 knots (22 km/h; 14 mph)
- Complement: 151
- Sensors & processing systems: Radar, sonar
- Armament: 1 × 5-inch (127-millimeter) gun; 2 × twin 40--millimeter gun mounts (except Absecon 1 quadruple 40-millimeter mount and Dexter no 40-millimeter guns); 2 twin 40--millimeter gun mounts; 2 twin 20-mm antiaircraft gun mounts (removed 1957); 1 Hedgehog Mark 10; 4 depth charge projectors; Triple 12.75-inch (324-millimeter) antisubmarine warfare torpedo tubes fitted mid-1960s

The Casco class was a large class of United States Coast Guard cutters in commission from the late 1940s through the late 1980s. They saw service as weather reporting ships in the Atlantic and Pacific Oceans until the early 1970s, and some saw combat service during the Vietnam War.

== Design ==
Between 1941 and 1946, the United States Navy acquired 35 Barnegat-class small seaplane tenders, designated "AVP" in the Navy's alphanumeric hull numbering system and designed to logistically and administratively support a squadron of flying boats operating from undeveloped areas and, with a substantial anti-air, antisurface, and antisubmarine capability, to escort larger seaplane tenders. Most of them served during World War II, although even during the war the Navy determined the number of Barnegats to be surplus to requirements; as a result, one was completed as a catapult training ship for Navy floatplane pilots (retaining its "AVP" designation) and four were converted during construction into motor torpedo boat tenders, redesignated "AGP".

After World War II, the Navy had a surplus of seaplane tenders, and the Coast Guard was looking for ships to serve on ocean stations in the Atlantic and Pacific Oceans on weather-reporting duties, also performing law enforcement and search and rescue operations as required. The Barnegats were reliable, long-ranged, and seaworthy, and had good habitability, and, suitably modified, were good candidates to meet the Coast Guard's requirements; in the words of the Coast Guard's assessment of the Barnegats, "The workmanship on the vessel is generally quite superior to that observed on other vessels constructed during the war. The vessel has ample space for stores, living accommodations, ships, offices and recreational facilities. The main engine system is excellent. . . .The performance of the vessel in moderate to heavy seas is definitely superior to that of any other cutter. This vessel can be operated at higher speed without storm damage than other Coast Guard vessels."

== Acquisition and modifications ==
The Navy transferred three of the seaplane tenders outright to the Coast Guard in 1946; they entered service that year and in 1947. The Navy loaned twelve more seaplane tenders, the catapult training ship, and two of the motor torpedo boat tenders to the Coast Guard in 1948, and these entered Coast Guard service in 1948 and 1949; in 1966, the Navy transferred these ships outright to the Coast Guard as well. Of the ships the Coast Guard received, two had been built by the Boston Navy Yard at Boston, Massachusetts, and the rest in the state of Washington: three by Associated Shipbuilders, Inc., at Seattle, ten by Lake Washington Shipyard at Houghton, and three by the Puget Sound Navy Yard at Bremerton.

Once they were accepted into Coast Guard service, a number of changes were made to prepare the ships for ocean-station duty. A balloon shelter was added aft, a hydrographic winch and an oceanographic winch were installed, and spaces on board were devoted to oceanographic equipment.

== Classification ==
Under the alphanumeric hull classification system in use at the time, Coast Guard cutters transferred from the Navy retained their Navy classification, with a "W" added to the beginning of the classification to indicate their Coast Guard subordination. The former seaplane tenders and the former catapult training ship thus all received the classification "WAVP"; the two former motor torpedo boat tenders (AGPs), which reverted to their original "AVP" designation before transfer to the Coast Guard, also entered Coast Guard service as WAVPs. The only exception was Dexter, which initially was designated WAGC-18, but soon received a WAVP designation like the others.

In 1965, Rockaway, uniquely among the Cascos, was reclassified as an "oceanographic" ship, WAGO-377.

In 1966 the Coast Guard reclassified all of the Cascos—including Rockaway—as high endurance cutters and changed their classification to "WHEC". The ships retained the same hull numbers they had had as WAVPs.

Some Cascos later underwent additional classification changes as their roles changed in their final years in service. Unimak was a training ship (WTR-379) from 1969 to 1975 before reverting to her WHEC classification, Gresham became a "meteorological cutter" (WAGW-387) in 1970, and Rockaway became an "offshore law enforcement vessel" (WOLE-377) in 1971.

== Naming ==
The class was named for USCGC Casco (WAVP-370), later WHEC-370, the unit with the lowest Coast Guard alphanumeric hull number. The three ships transferred outright to the Coast Guard in 1946 were given new names upon commissioning in the Coast Guard, being named after U.S. Secretaries of the Treasury. The 15 ships loaned to the Coast Guard in 1948 retained their original Navy names, and were named for islands, bays, and inlets, around the United States and the then-Territory of Alaska.

== Operations ==
The first three ships entered service in 1946 and 1947, with the rest following in 1948 and 1949. Apart from Dexter, which was out of commission for several years in the 1950s, all remained active without break until the late 1960s and early 1970s, and one, Unimak, after a brief period out of commission in the mid-1970s, remained in service until 1988. All saw service as weather-reporting ships on ocean station patrols until the late 1960s and early 1970s except Dexter, which became the Coast Guard's United States West Coast training ship after returning to commission in 1958.

The Cascos had a variety of fates. The Navy sank five as targets in 1968 and 1969, and five others were scrapped in the early 1970s. The last survivor in Coast Guard service, Unimak, was scuttled to form an artificial reef.

Seven ships, Absecon, Chincoteague, Yakutat, Bering Strait, Castle Rock, & Cook Inlet were transferred to South Vietnam in 1971 and 1972, renamed as the RVNS Pham Ngu Lao, Lý Thường Kiệt, Trần Nhật Duật, Trần Quang Khải, Trần Bình Trọng, & Trần Quốc Toản respectively. When South Vietnam collapsed at the end of the Vietnam War in 1975, six fled to the Philippines, where two were cannibalized for spare parts and the other four entered service in the Philippine Navy, operating as Andrés Bonifacio-class frigates until the mid-1980s. The seventh ship, RVNS Pham Ngu Lao, the former Absecon, was captured by North Vietnam, appears to have remained active in the Vietnam People's Navy into the 1990s, and may remain afloat today as the last surviving Barnegat- or Casco-class ship.

== Ships ==
=== USCGC Casco (WAVP-370, WHEC-370) ===
Casco served as the U.S. Navy seaplane tender USS Casco (AVP-12) from 1941 to 1947. She was loaned to the U.S. Coast Guard in 1949 and commissioned that year. She was stationed at Boston, Massachusetts, throughout her Coast Guard career, performing ocean station patrols in the North Atlantic. Redesignated WHEC-370 in 1966, she was decommissioned in 1969. The U.S. Navy sank her as a target later that year.

=== USCGC Mackinac (WAVP-371, WHEC-371) ===
Mackinac served as the U.S. Navy seaplane tender USS Mackinac (AVP-13) from 1942 to 1946. She was loaned to the U.S. Coast Guard in 1949 and commissioned that year. She was stationed at New York City throughout her Coast Guard career, performing ocean station patrols in the North Atlantic. Redesignated WHEC-371 in 1966, she was decommissioned in 1967. The U.S. Navy sank her as a target in 1968.

=== USCGC Humboldt (WAVP-372, WHEC-372) ===
Humboldt served as the U.S. Navy seaplane tender USS Humboldt (AVP-21) from 1941 to 1947. She was loaned to the U.S. Coast Guard in 1949 and commissioned that year. She was stationed at Boston, Massachusetts, from 1949 to 1966 and at Portland, Maine from 1966 to 1969, performing ocean station patrols in the North Atlantic throughout her career. Redesignated WHEC-372 and transferred permanently to the Coast Guard in 1966, she was decommissioned in 1969 and sold for scrapping in 1970.

=== USCGC Matagorda (WAVP-373, WHEC-373) ===
Matagorda served as the U.S. Navy seaplane tender USS Matagorda (AVP-22) from 1941 to 1946. She was loaned to the U.S. Coast Guard in 1949 and commissioned that year. She was stationed at Boston, Massachusetts, from 1949 to 1954, performing ocean station patrols in the North Atlantic, and at Honolulu, Hawaii, from 1954 to 1967, performing ocean station patrols in the Pacific. Redesignated WHEC-373 in 1966, she was decommissioned in 1967. The U.S. Navy sank her as a target in 1969.

=== USCGC Absecon (WAVP-374, WHEC-374) ===
Absecon served as the U.S. Navy catapult training ship USS Absecon (AVP-23) from 1943 to 1947. She was loaned to the U.S. Coast Guard in 1949 and commissioned that year. She was stationed at Norfolk, Virginia, throughout her Coast Guard career, performing ocean station patrols in the North Atlantic. Redesignated WHEC-374 and transferred permanently to the Coast Guard in 1966, she was decommissioned in 1972 and transferred to South Vietnam, becoming the patrol vessel RVNS Phạm Ngũ Lão (HQ-15). Captured by North Vietnam upon the collapse of South Vietnam in 1975, she became the patrol vessel PRVSN Phạm Ngũ Lão (HQ-01) in the Vietnam People's Navy and may have remained an active unit until into the 1990s. Her current status is unclear, although she may remain afloat as the last surviving Barnegat- or Casco-class ship.

=== USCGC Chincoteague (WAVP-375, WHEC-375) ===
Chincoteague served as the U.S. Navy seaplane tender USS Chincoteague (AVP-24) from 1943 to 1946. She was loaned to the U.S. Coast Guard in 1949 and commissioned that year. She was stationed at Norfolk, Virginia, throughout her Coast Guard career, performing ocean station patrols in the North Atlantic. Redesignated WHEC-375 and transferred permanently to the Coast Guard in 1966, she was decommissioned in 1972 and transferred to South Vietnam, becoming the patrol vessel RVNS Lý Thường Kiệt (HQ-16). Upon the collapse of South Vietnam in 1975, she fled to the Philippines, where she served as the frigate BRP Andrés Bonifacio (PF-7) until 1985.

=== USCGC Coos Bay (WAVP-376, WHEC-376) ===
Coos Bay served as the U.S. Navy seaplane tender USS Coos Bay (AVP-25) from 1943 to 1946. She was loaned to the U.S. Coast Guard in 1949 and commissioned that year. She was stationed at Portland, Maine, throughout her Coast Guard career, performing ocean station patrols in the North Atlantic. Redesignated WHEC-376 and permananelty transferred to the Coast Guard in 1966, she was decommissioned later that year. The U.S. Navy sank her as a target in 1968.

=== USCGC Rockaway (WAVP-377, WAGO-377, WHEC-377, WOLE-377) ===
Rockaway served as the U.S. Navy seaplane tender USS Rockaway (AVP-29) from 1943 to 1946. She was loaned to the U.S. Coast Guard in 1948 and commissioned in 1949. She was stationed at Staten Island in New York City throughout her Coast Guard career. Until 1965, her main duty was to serve on ocean station patrols in the North Atlantic. Redesignated as an "oceanographic ship," WAGP-377, in 1965, she became more involved in oceanographic survey work. Redesignated WHEC-377 and permanently transferred to the Coast Guard in 1966, she was again reclassified as an "offshore law-enforcement vessel," WOLE-377, in 1971. She was decommissioned in 1972 and sold for scrapping.

=== USCGC Half Moon (WAVP-378, WHEC-378) ===
Half Moon served as the U.S. Navy seaplane tender USS Half Moon (AVP-26) from 1943 to 1946. She was loaned to the U.S. Coast Guard in 1948 and commissioned the same year. She was stationed at Staten Island and Governors Island in New York City throughout her Coast Guard career. Her main duty was to serve on ocean station patrols in the North Atlantic. Redesignated WHEC-378 and permanently transferred to the Coast Guard in 1966, she served one combat tour in Vietnam during the Vietnam War in 1967 as a part of Coast Guard Squadron Three. She was decommissioned in 1969 and sold for scrapping in 1973.

=== USCGC Unimak (WAVP-379, WHEC-379, WTR-379, WHEC-379) ===
Unimak served as the U.S. Navy seaplane tender USS Unimak (AVP-31) from 1943 to 1946. She was loaned to the U.S. Coast Guard in 1948 and commissioned in 1949. She was stationed at Boston, Massachusetts, from 1949 to 1954; at Cape May, New Jersey, New Jersey, from 1954 to 1972; and at Yorktown, Virginia, from 1972 to 1975, her main duty being to serve on ocean station patrols in the North Atlantic. Redesignated WHEC-379 and permanently transferred to the Coast Guard in 1966, she reclassified as a training ship and redesignated again as WTR-379 in 1969. She was decommissioned in 1975. Recommissioned in 1977 and again designated WHEC-379, she was stationed at New Bedford, Massachusetts, for the remainder of her Coast Guard career, focusing primarily on fisheries patrols in the Atlantic and law enforcement operations in the Caribbean. She was decommissioned in 1988 and scuttled to form an artificial reef.

=== USCGC Yakutat (WAVP-380, WHEC-380) ===
Yakutat served as the U.S. Navy seaplane tender USS Yakutat (AVP-32) from 1944 to 1946, She was loaned to the U.S. Coast Guard in 1948 and commissioned the same year. Stationed at Portland, Maine, in 1949 and at New Bedford, Massachusetts, from 1949 to 1971, her main duty was to serve on ocean station patrols in the North Atlantic. She was redesignated WHEC-379 and permanently transferred to the Coast Guard in 1966, and served two combat tours in Vietnam during the Vietnam War with Coast Guard Squadron Three, from 1967 to 1968 and in 1970. Transferred to South Vietnam in 1971, she served as RVNS Trần Nhật Duật (HQ-03). Upon the collapse of the South Vietnamese government at the end of the Vietnam War in 1975, she fled to the Philippines, where she was cannibalized for spare parts.

=== USCGC Barataria (WAVP-381, WHEC-381) ===
Barataria served as the U.S. Navy seaplane tender USS Barataria (AVP-33) from 1944 to 1946. She was loaned to the U.S. Coast Guard in 1948 and commissioned the same year. She was based at Portland, Maine, from 1949 to 1968, primarily responsible for ocean station patrols in the North Atlantic. In 1966 she was reclassified as a high endurance cutter, redesignated WHEC-381, and transferred outright to the Coast Guard. She served one combat tour in Vietnam during the Vietnam War from 1967 to 1968 as a part of Coast Guard Squadron Three. She was based at San Francisco, California, from 1968 to 1969, where she carried out for law-enforcement and search-and-rescue duties in the Pacific. She was decommissioned in 1969 and sold for scrapping in 1970.

=== USCGC Bering Strait (WAVP-382, WHEC-382) ===
Bering Strait served as the U.S. Navy seaplane tender USS Bering Strait (AVP-34) 1944 to 1946. She was loaned to the U.S. Coast Guard and in 1948 and commissioned the same year. She served on ocean station patrols in the Pacific Ocean throughout her Coast Guard career, based at Seattle, Washington from 1948 to 1954 and at Honolulu, Hawaii from 1954 to 1971. She was redesignated WHEC-382 and transferred permanently to the Coast Guard in 1966, and served two combat tours in Vietnam during the Vietnam War with Coast Guard Squadron Three, from 1967 to 1968 and in 1970. Transferred to South Vietnam in 1971, she served as RVNS Trần Quang Khải (HQ-02). Upon the collapse of the South Vietnamese government at the end of the Vietnam War in 1975, she fled to the Philippines, and served in the Philippine Navy until 1985 as BRP Diego Silang (PF-9).

=== USCGC Castle Rock (WAVP-383, WHEC-383) ===
Castle Rock served as the U.S. Navy seaplane tender USS Castle Rock (AVP-35) from 1944 to 1946. She was loaned to the U.S. Coast Guard in 1948 and commissioned the same year. She was stationed at Boston, Massachusetts, from 1948 to 1967 and at Portland, Maine, from 1967 to 1971, primarily responsible for ocean station patrols in North Atlantic, and spent one combat tour in Vietnam during the Vietnam War with Coast Guard Squadron Three in 1971. She was transferred to South Vietnam in 1971 and served as RVNS Trần Bình Trọng (HQ-05). Upon the collapse of the South Vietnamese government at the end of the Vietnam War in 1975, she fled to the Philippines, and served in the Philippine Navy until 1985 as BRP Francisco Dagohoy (PF-10).

=== USCGC Cook Inlet (WAVP-384, WHEC-384) ===
Cook Inlet served as the U.S. Navy seaplane tender USS Cook Inlet (AVP-36) from 1944 to 1946. She was loaned to the U.S. Coast Guard in 1948 and was commissioned in 1949. Based at Portland, Maine, throughout her Coast Guard career, she was primarily responsible for ocean station patrols in the North Atlantic and spent one combat tour in Vietnam during the Vietnam War with Coast Guard Squadron Three in 1971. She was transferred to South Vietnam in 1971 and served as RVNS Trần Quốc Toản (HQ-06). Upon the collapse of the South Vietnamese government at the end of the Vietnam War in 1975, she fled to the Philippines, where she was cannibalized for spare parts.

=== USCGC Dexter (WAGC-18, WAVP-385, WHEC-385) ===
Dexter served as the U.S. Navy seaplane tender USS Biscayne (AVP-11) from 1941 to 1946. She was transferred to the U.S. Coast Guard in 1946 and commissioned the same year as USCGC Dexter (WAGC-18), soon changed to WAVP-385. Based at Boston, Massachusetts, from 1946 to 1952. she primarily was responsible for ocean station patrols in the North Atlantic. Out of commission from 1952 to 1958, she then was based at Alameda, California, from 1958 to 1969, serving as the Coast Guard's United States West Coast training ship. She was redesignated WHEC-385 in 1966. She was decommissioned in 1968, and the U.S. Navy sank her as a target later that year.

=== USCGC McCulloch (WAVP-386, WHEC-386) ===
McCulloch served as the U.S. Navy motor torpedo boat tender USS Wachapreague (AGP-8) from 1944 to 1946, She was transferred to the U.S. Coast Guard in 1946 and commissioned as McCulloch (WAVP-386) the same year. She was based at Boston, Massachusetts, from 1946 to 1966 and at Wilmington, North Carolina, from 1966 to 1972, primarily responsible for ocean station patrols in the North Atlantic. In 1966 she was redesignated WHEC-386. She was transferred to South Vietnam in 1972, and served as RVNS Ngô Quyền (HQ-17). Upon the collapse of the South Vietnamese government at the end of the Vietnam War in 1975, she fled to the Philippines, and served in the Philippine Navy until either 1985 or 1990 as BRP Gregorio del Pilar (PF-8).

=== USCGC Gresham (WAVP-387, WHEC-387, WAGW-387) ===
Gresham served as the U.S. Navy motor torpedo boat tender USS Willoughby (AGP-9) from 1944 to 1946. She was transferred to the U.S. Coast Guard in 1946 and commissioned in 1947 as Gresham (WAVP-387). Based at Alameda, California, from 1947 to 1970, she was primarily responsible for ocean station patrols in the Pacific Ocean, and was redesignated WHEC-387 in 1966. She served one combat tour in Vietnam during the Vietnam War from 1967 to 1968 as a part of Coast Guard Squadron Three. She was based at Norfolk, Virginia, from 1970 to 1973, responsible for ocean station patrols in the North Atlantic, and was reclassified as a meteorological cutter and redesignated WAGW-387 in 1970. She was decommissioned and sold for scrapping in 1973.

== See also ==
- Barnegat-class small seaplane tender
