= USS Cook Inlet =

Tender of the United States Navy

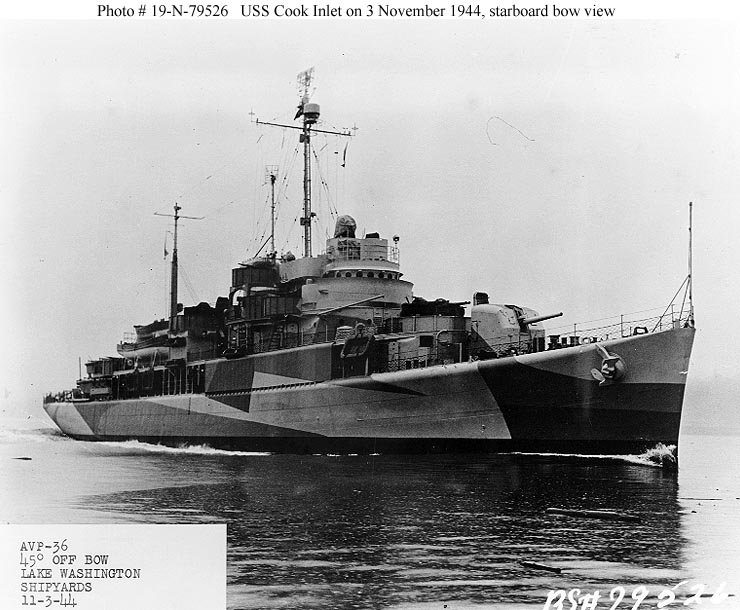
- USS Cook Inlet (AVP-36) off Houghton, Washington, on 3 November 1944, two days before commissioning.

History

United States
- Name: USS Cook Inlet
- Namesake: Cook Inlet, on the coast of Alaska north of Kodiak
- Builder: Lake Washington Shipyard, Houghton, Washington
- Laid down: 23 August 1943
- Launched: 13 May 1944
- Sponsored by: Mrs. H. K. Stubbs
- Commissioned: 5 November 1944
- Decommissioned: 31 March 1946
- Honors and awards: One battle star for World War II service
- Fate: Loaned to U.S. Coast Guard 20 September 1948; Transferred permanently to Coast Guard 26 September 1966

United States
- Name: USCGC Cook Inlet (WAVP-384)
- Namesake: Previous name retained
- Acquired: Loaned by United States Navy to Coast Guard 20 September 1948; Transferred permanently from Navy to Coast Guard 26 September 1966
- Commissioned: 15 January 1949
- Reclassified: High endurance cutter (WHEC-384) 1 May 1966
- Decommissioned: 21 December 1971
- Honors and awards: Two campaign stars for Vietnam War service
- Fate: Transferred to South Vietnam 21 December 1971

South Vietnam
- Name: RVNS Trần Quốc Toản (HQ-06)
- Namesake: Trần Quốc Toản (1267–1285), a general and prince of the Trần dynasty
- Acquired: 21 December 1971
- Fate: Fled to Philippines on collapse of South Vietnam April 1975; Formally transferred to Republic of the Philippines 5 April 1976

Philippines
- Acquired: 5 April 1976
- Commissioned: never
- Fate: Cannibilized for spare parts; Discarded 1982

General characteristics (seaplane tender)
- Class & type: Barnegat-class small seaplane tender
- Displacement: 1,766 tons (light); 2,750 tons (full load)
- Length: 311 ft 8 in (95.00 m)
- Beam: 41 ft 1 in (12.52 m)
- Draught: 13 ft 6 in (4.11 m)
- Installed power: 6000 horsepower (4.48 megawatts)
- Propulsion: Diesel engines, two shafts
- Speed: 18.6 knots (34 km/h)
- Complement: 215 (ship's company); 367 (with aviation unit)
- Armament: 1 × single 5 in (130 mm) 38-caliber dual-purpose gun mount; 1 × quad 40-mm antiaircraft gun mount; 2 × dual 40-mm antiaircraft gun mounts; 4 × dual 20-mm antiaircraft gun mounts; 2 × depth charge tracks
- Aviation facilities: Supplies, spare parts, repairs, and berthing for one seaplane squadron; 80,000 US gallons (300,000 L) aviation fuel

General characteristics (Coast Guard cutter)
- Class & type: Casco-class cutter
- Displacement: 2,528.7 tons (full load) in 1966
- Length: 309 ft 10.125 in (94.44038 m) overall; 298 ft 11.125 in (91.11298 m) between perpendiculars
- Beam: 41 ft 0 in (12.50 m) maximum
- Draft: 12 ft 6 in (3.81 m) at full load in 1966
- Installed power: 6,080 bhp (4,530 kW)
- Propulsion: Fairbanks-Morse geared diesel engines, two shafts; 166,601 US gallons (630,650 L) of fuel
- Speed: 19.4 knots (35.9 km/h) (maximum sustained in 1966); 10.5 knots (19.4 km/h) (economic in 1966)
- Range: 12,500 nautical miles (23,200 km) at 19.4 knots (35.9 km/h) in 1966; 20,800 nautical miles (38,500 km) at 10.5 knots (19.4 km/h) in 1966
- Complement: 151 (10 officers, 3 warrant officers, 138 enlisted personnel) in 1966
- Sensors & processing systems: Radars in 1966 (one each): SPS-23, SPS-29B, SPS-4B, SPS-52; Sonar in 1966: SQS-1
- Armament: In 1966: 1 x single 5-inch (127 mm) 38-caliber Mark 12-1 gun mount; 1 x Mark 52 gunfire control system (GFCS) director; 1 x Mark 26 Mod 1 fire control radar; 1 x Mark 10 Mod 1 antisubmarine projector; 2 x Mark 32 Mod 5 torpedo launchers

General characteristics (South Vietnamese frigate)
- Class & type: Trần Quang Khải-class frigate
- Displacement: 1,766 tons (standard); 2,800 tons (full load)
- Length: 310 ft 9 in (94.72 m) (overall); 300 ft 0 in (91.44 m) waterline
- Beam: 41 ft 1 in (12.52 m)
- Draft: 13 ft 5 in (4.09 m)
- Installed power: 6,080 horsepower (4.54 megawatts)
- Propulsion: 2 x Fairbanks Morse 38D diesel engines
- Speed: approximately 18 knots (maximum)
- Complement: approximately 200
- Armament: 1 × 5-inch/38-caliber (127-millimeter) dual-purpose gun; 1 or 2 x 81-millimeter mortars in some ships; Several machine guns

USS Cook Inlet (AVP-36) was a United States Navy Barnegat-class small seaplane tender in commission from 1944 to 1946. She tended seaplanes during World War II in the Pacific and earned one battle star for her service. After the war, she was transferred to the United States Coast Guard, and was in commission as the Coast Guard cutter USCGC Cook Inlet (WAVP-384), later WHEC-384, from 1949 to 1971. She saw service in the Vietnam War during her Coast Guard career, receiving two campaign stars for her operations during the conflict. Transferred to South Vietnam in 1971, she operated as the Republic of Vietnam Navy frigate RVNS Trần Quốc Toản (HQ-06) until South Vietnam's collapse in April 1975 at the end of the Vietnam War. She fled to the Philippines and in 1976 was transferred to the Philippine Navy, which never commissioned her, instead using her as a source of spare parts for her sister ships, the Andrés Bonifacio-class frigates, before discarding her in 1982.

== Construction and commissioning ==
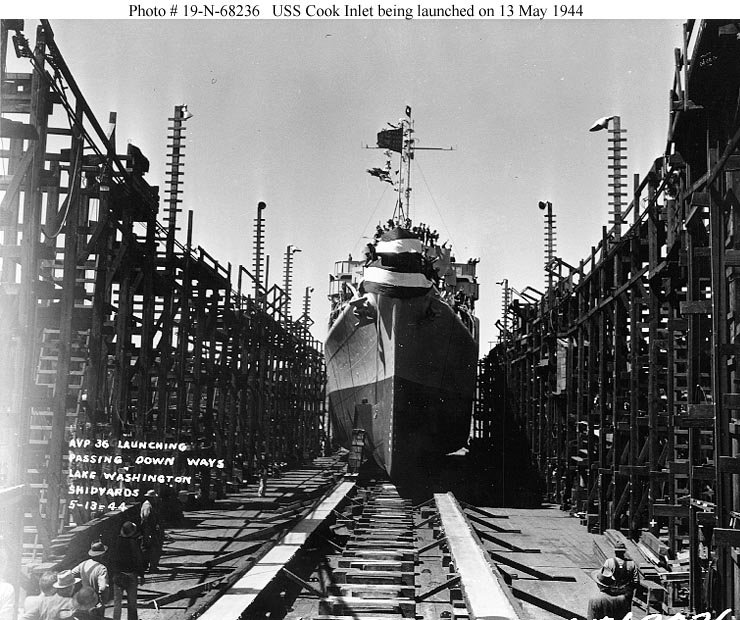
USS Cook Inlet (AVP-36) is launched at Lake Washington Shipyard at Houghton, Washington, on 13 May 1944.

Cook Inlet (AVP-36) was laid down on 23 August 1943 at Lake Washington Shipyard at Houghton, Washington. She was launched on 13 May 1944, sponsored by Mrs. H. K. Stubbs, wife of Captain Stubbs, and commissioned on 5 November 1944.

== United States Navy service ==
=== World War II ===
Cook Inlet departed San Diego, California, on January 15, 1945, and arrived at Pearl Harbor, Hawaii, on January 21, 1945. She tended seaplanes at Hilo, Hawaii, from January 25, 1945, to January 31, 1945.

Cook Inlet arrived off Saipan on February 26, 1945, to serve with the escort and patrol group based there, and from March 2, 1945, to March 14, 1945, was on an air-sea rescue station during the invasion of Iwo Jima. Cook Inlet rescued 27 survivors of downed bombers. She was still on duty at Iwo Jima when hostilities with Japan ended on August 15, 1945, bringing World War II to a close.

==== Honors and awards ====
Cook Inlet received one battle star for World War II service.

=== Post-World War II ===
Cook Inlet remained on duty off Iwo Jima until 29 November 1945, when she sailed to Jinsen, Korea, for duty as station tender. She then returned to the United States, calling at Iwo Jima and Pearl Harbor before reaching San Francisco, California, on 22 January 1946.

=== Decommissioning ===
Cook Inlet was decommissioned and placed in reserve in the Pacific Reserve Fleet on 31 March 1946.

== United States Coast Guard service ==
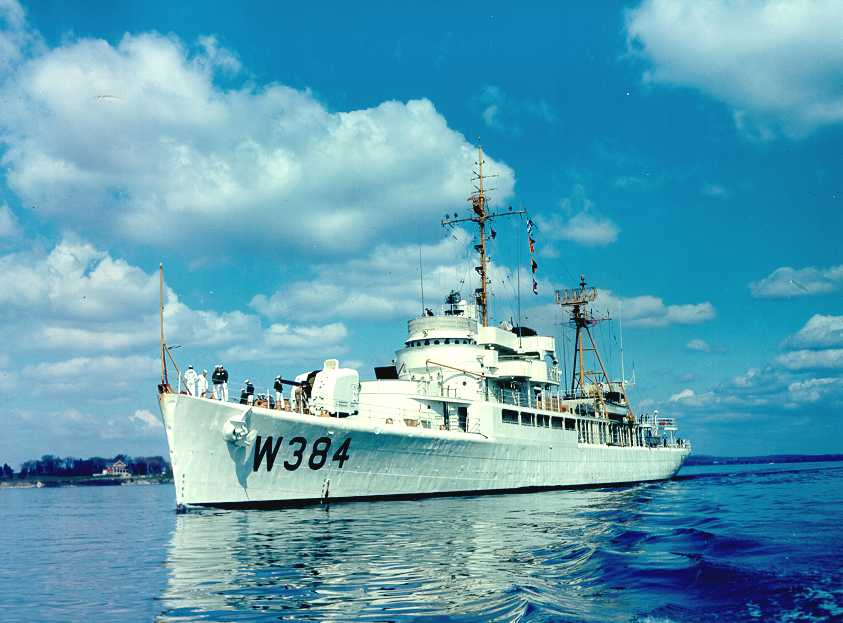
USCGC Cook Inlet (WAVP-384), later WHEC-384, some time prior to the Coast Guard's 1967 adoption of the "racing stripe" markings on its ships.

Barnegat-class ships were very reliable and seaworthy and had good habitability, and the Coast Guard viewed them as ideal for ocean station duty, in which they would perform weather reporting and search and rescue tasks, once they were modified by having a balloon shelter added aft and having oceanographic equipment, an oceanographic winch, and a hydrographic winch installed. After World War II, the U.S. Navy transferred 18 of the ships to the Coast Guard, in which they were known as the Casco-class cutters.

The Navy loaned Cook Inlet to the Coast Guard on 20 September 1948. After undergoing conversion for Coast Guard use, she was commissioned into the Coast Guard on 15 January 1949 as USCGC Cook Inlet (WAVP-384).

=== Service history ===
==== North Atlantic ====
Cook Inlet's home port was Portland, Maine, throughout her Coast Guard career of almost 23 years. She served in the North Atlantic Ocean, where her primary duty was to serve on ocean stations to gather meteorological data. While on duty in one of these stations, she was required to patrol a 210-square-mile (544-square-kilometer) area for three weeks at a time, leaving the area only when physically relieved by another Coast Guard cutter or in the case of a dire emergency. While on station, she acted as an aircraft check point at the point of no return, a relay point for messages from ships and aircraft, a source of the latest weather information for passing aircraft, as a floating oceanographic laboratory, and as a search-and-rescue ship for downed aircraft and vessels in distress, and she engaged in law enforcement operations.

On 12 October 1953, Cook Inlet rendezvoused with the Coast Guard cutter USCGC Chambers (WDE-491) in the Atlantic to take a medical patient from Chambers which Chambers had evacuated the previous day from the merchant ship Neva West. She then transported that patient to medical facilities ashore.

Cook Inlet took part in the United States Coast Guard Academy cadet cruise of August 1965.

On 28 January 1966, Cook Inlet rescued survivors in of a swamped pleasure craft. Between 3 and 8 February 1966, she escorted the distressed Liberian merchant vessel Arion to Bermuda. On 8 April 1966, she assisted the burning Norwegian passenger-freighter Viking Princess, sending a fire and rescue party aboard Viking Princess to fight her fires; rushing from Guantanamo Bay, Cuba, in a three-hour voyage, the U.S. Navy frigate USS Wilkinson (DL-5) also assisted Viking Princess, taking 13 survivors of the ship aboard from the Republic of China merchant ship Chungking Victory and transporting them to Guantanamo Bay. In 1969, "Cook Inlet" transported Jacques Piccard and other scientific personnel to Portland after their research sub, the "Ben Franklin" surfaced after its month long, 1400 mile journey, drifting in the Gulf stream.

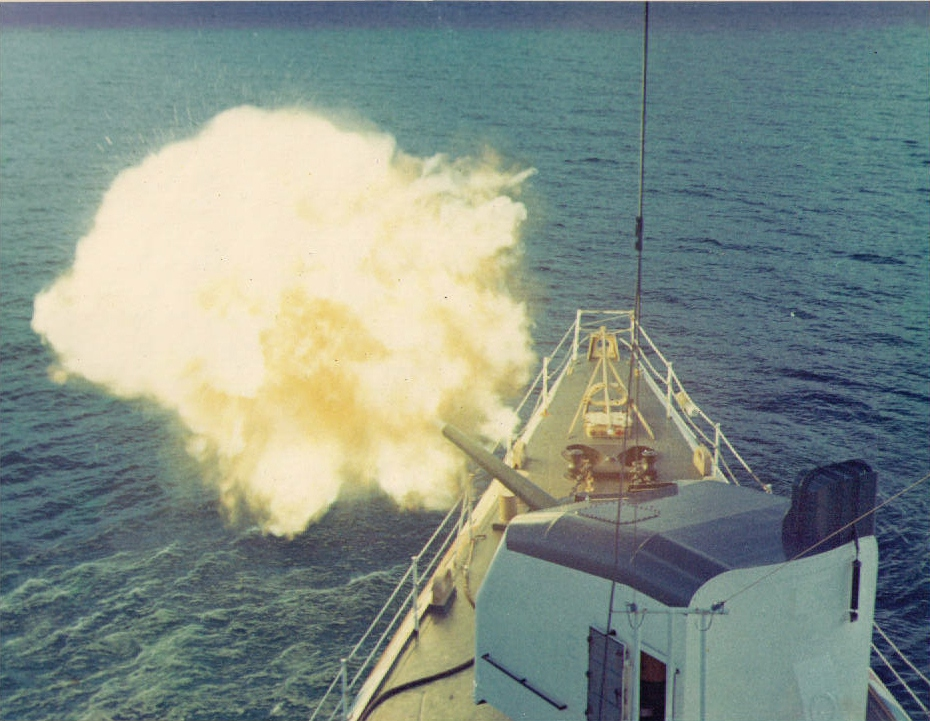
USCGC Cook Inlet's 5-inch (127-mm) 38-caliber gun fires as she conducts a close fire support mission off the coast of South Vietnam in 1971.

Cook Inlet was reclassified as a high endurance cutter and re-designated WHEC-384 on 1 May 1966. Her loan period from the Navy came to an end on 26 September 1966, when she was transferred permanently from the Navy to the Coast Guard.

On 8 January 1968, Cook Inlet evacuated a crewman in medical distress from the Swedish merchant ship California.

==== Vietnam War ====
Cook Inlet was assigned to Coast Guard Squadron Three in South Vietnam on 2 July 1971. Coast Guard Squadron Three was tasked to operate in conjunction with U.S. Navy forces in Operation Market Time, the interdiction of North Vietnamese arms and munitions traffic along the coastline of South Vietnam during the Vietnam War. The squadron's other Vietnam War duties included fire support for ground forces, resupplying Coast Guard and Navy patrol boats, and search-and-rescue operations. Cook Inlet served in this capacity until 21 December 1971.

===== Honors and awards =====
Cook Inlet earned two campaign stars for her Vietnam War service, for:

- Consolidation I 16 July 1971 – 9 August 1971, 27 August 1971 – 15 September 1971, 1 October 1971 – 24 October 1971, and 22 November 1971 – 30 November 1971
- Consolidation II 1 December 1971 – 15 December 1971

=== Decommissioning ===
The Coast Guard decommissioned Cook Inlet in South Vietnam on 21 December 1971, the day her Vietnam War tour ended.

== Republic of Vietnam Navy service ==
RVNS Trần Quốc Toản (HQ-06) pierside at center, with her sister ships RVNS Trần Quang Khải (HQ-02) (left) and RVNS Trần Bình Trọng (HQ-05) (right).

On 21 December 1971 – the day the Coast Guard decommissioned her – Cook Inlet was transferred to South Vietnam, which commissioned her into the Republic of Vietnam Navy as the frigate RVNS Trần Quốc Toản (HQ-06). By mid-1972, six other former Casco-class cutters – known in the Republic of Vietnam Navy as the Trần Quang Khải-class frigates – also were in South Vietnamese service. They were the largest warships in the South Vietnamese inventory, and their 5-inch (127-millimeter) guns were South Vietnam's largest naval guns. Trần Quốc Toản and her sisters fought alongside U.S. Navy ships during the final years of the Vietnam War, patrolling the South Vietnamese coast and providing gunfire support to South Vietnamese forces ashore.

When South Vietnam collapsed at the end of the Vietnam War in late April 1975, Trần Quốc Toản became a ship without a country. She fled to Subic Bay in the Philippines, packed with South Vietnamese refugees. On 22 and 23 May 1975, a U.S. Coast Guard team inspected Trần Quốc Toản and five of her sister ships, which also had fled to the Philippines in April 1975. One of the inspectors noted: "These vessels brought in several hundred refugees and are generally rat-infested. They are in a filthy, deplorable condition. Below decks generally would compare with a garbage scow."

== Philippine Navy ==
The Republic of the Philippines took custody of Trần Quốc Toản after her arrival in 1975, and the United States formally transferred her to the Philippines on 5 April 1976. She did not enter Philippine Navy service; instead she and her sister ship RVNS Trần Nhật Duật (HQ-03) were cannibalized for spare parts to allow the Philippines to keep four other sister ships – all former South Vietnamese ships known in the Philippine Navy as the Andrés Bonifacio-class frigates – in commission in the Philippine Navy.

The former Trần Quốc Toản was discarded in 1982 and probably scrapped.
