= Unimak Bay =

Coordinates: 54°34′53″N 164°10′49″W

Unimak Bay (or Unimak Bight) is a bay on the southern side of Unimak Island in the Aleutian Islands in Alaska.

The United States Navy seaplane tender USS Unimak, in commission from 1943 to 1946, was named for the bay, and retained the name while she served as the United States Coast Guard Cutter USCGC Unimak from 1949 to 1988.
