= High endurance cutter =

Ship designation

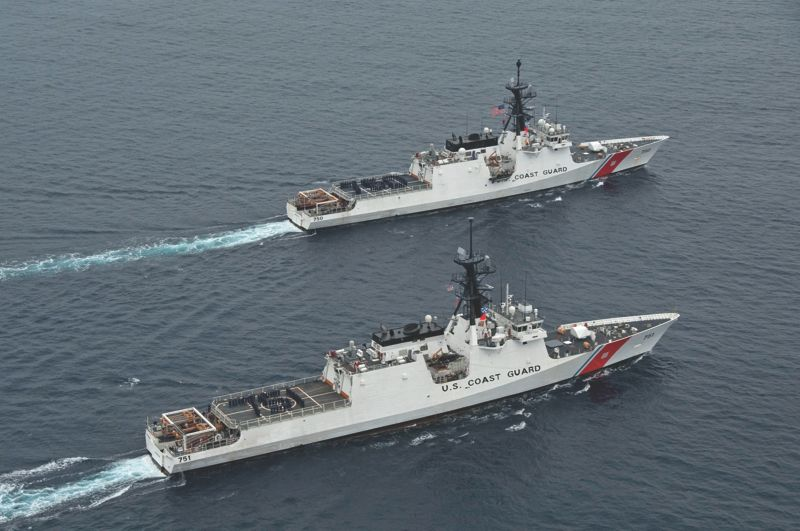
National Security cutters, USCGC Bertholf and USCGC Waesche, cruise together.

The designation of high endurance cutter (WHEC) was created in 1965 when the United States Coast Guard adopted its own designation system. High endurance cutters encompass the largest cutters, previously designated by the United States Navy as gunboats, destroyer escorts, and seaplane tenders. The term "High Endurance Cutter" may refer to any of five individual ship classes that have seen service in the Coast Guard.

- The Legend-class cutter is the newest class in this category.
- The Hamilton-class cutter was a 1960s design, also known as Secretary- or Hero-class cutters. While replaced by the Legend-class in American service, all were transferred to other nations as military aid and continue to operate.
- The Owasco-class cutter was a World War II design; the last was retired in the 1970s.
- The Casco-class cutter was a pre-World War II design; the last was retired in the 1980s under the Philippine Navy.
- The Treasury-class cutter, a 327-foot (100 m) class from 1936 to the mid-1980s.

== Class history ==
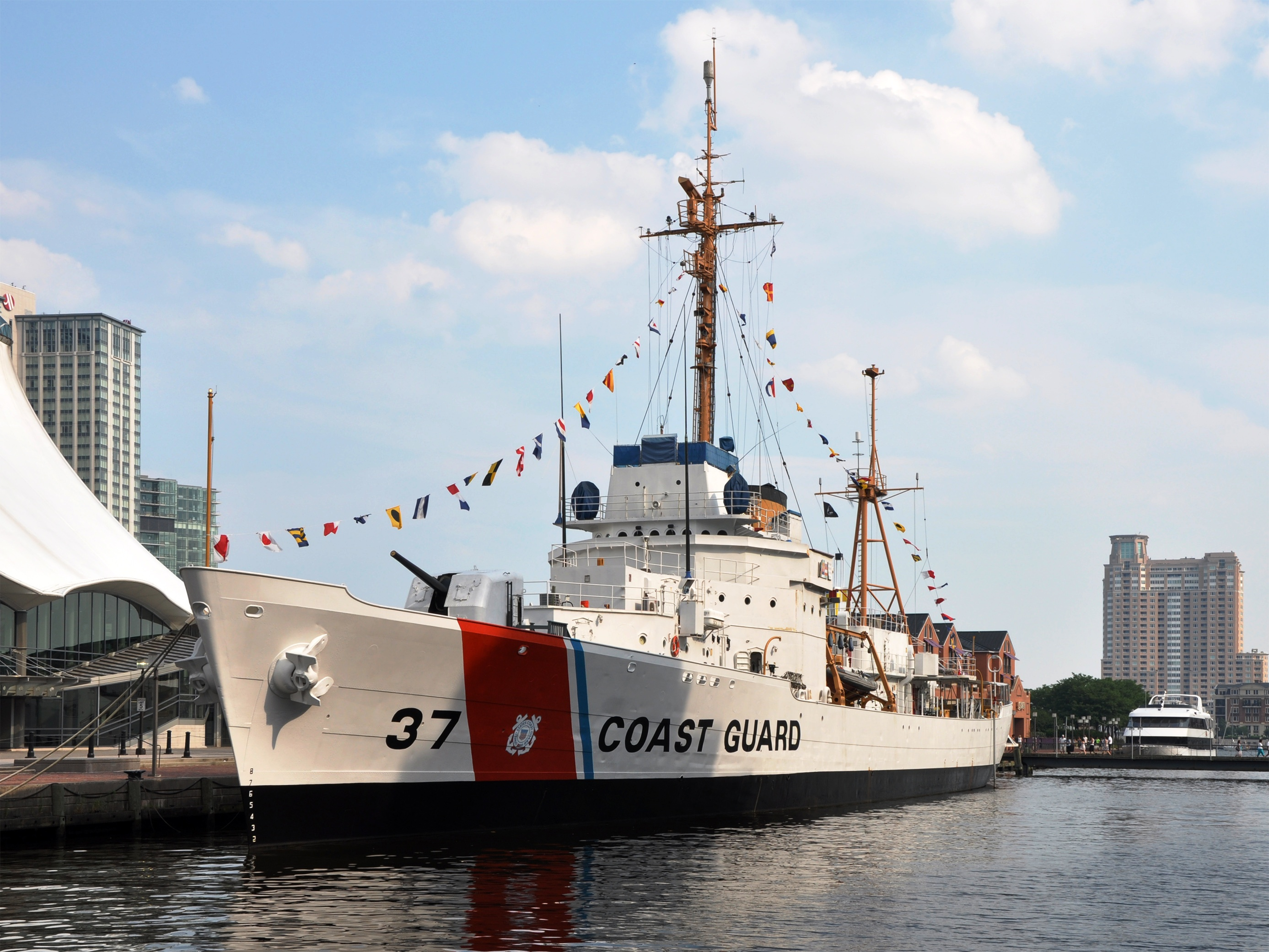
Treasury-class cutter WHEC-37

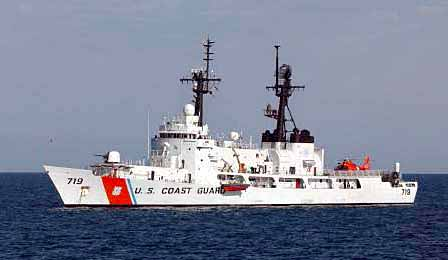
Hamilton-class cutter USCGC Boutwell

The US Coast Guard's predecessor, the U.S. Revenue Cutter Service designated cutters and craft based on classes. From approximately 1890 through to the formation of the US Coast Guard in 1915, the largest cutters were considered "First" class, coastal cutters and large tugs "Second" class, and small tugs and cutters "Third" class. Small harbor craft and similar vessels were referred to as "Launches".

With the formation of the US Coast Guard in 1915 classes were replaced by names. First class vessels became Cruising Cutters, while second and third class vessels became Harbor Cutters. This was further divided in 1920 when former second class ships were designated Inshore Patrol Cutters. Small craft continued to be referred to as Launches.

Starting during Prohibition as part of the US Coast Guard's response to liquor smuggling, the service commissioned a number of ex-US Navy destroyers to enhance the fleet. These vessels were classified as Coast Guard Destroyers until 1942 when the Coast Guard adopted Navy-style ship classifications. To distinguish US Navy ships from Coast Guard ships, the prefix letter "W" was affixed in front of all Coast Guard ship classifications. "W" was selected as it was unused in the Navy, and was thus free to be assigned without changing or confusing existing classifications.

Following the conclusion of World War II, the Coast Guard was transferred back to control of the US Treasury Department, but retained the ship classification system.

In 1965 the Coast Guard began classifying all large cutters as High Endurance Cutters (WHEC).

== Coast Guard destroyers ==
During prohibition and post-World War II, several destroyers and destroyer escorts were transferred to the Coast Guard.

Sampson-class destroyers

- USS Shaw (DD-68)
- USS Davis (DD-65)
- USS Wilkes (DD-67)

Tucker-class destroyers

- USS Conyngham (DD-58)
- USS Porter (DD-59)
- USS Tucker (DD-57)
- USS Wainwright (DD-62)

O'Brien-class destroyers

- USS Ericsson (DD-56)
- USS McDougal (DD-54)

Cassin-class destroyers

- USS Cassin (DD-43)
- USS Downes (DD-45)
- USS Cummings (DD-44)

Paulding-class destroyers

- USS Ammen (DD-35)
- USS Beale (DD-40)
- USS Burrows (DD-29)
- USS Fanning (DD-37)
- USS Henley (DD-39)
- USS Jouett (DD-41)
- USS McCall (DD-28)
- USS Monaghan (DD-32)
- USS Patterson (DD-36)
- USS Paulding (DD-22)
- USS Roe (DD-24)
- USS Trippe (DD-33)

Clemson-class destroyers

- USS Abel P. Upshur (DD-193)
- USS George E. Badger (DD-196)
- USS Herndon (DD-198)
- USS Hunt (DD-194)
- USS Welborn C. Wood (DD-195)
- USS Semmes (DD-189)

Edsall-class destroyer escorts

- USS Chambers (DE-391)
- USS Durant (DE-389)
- USS Lansing (DE-388)
- USS Vance (DE-387)
- USS Richey (DE-385)
- USS Ramsden (DE-382)
- USS Forster (DE-334)
- USS Koiner (DE-331)
- USS Finch (DE-328)
- USS Lowe (DE-325)
- USS Falgout (DE-324)
- USS Pride (DE-323)
- USS Newell (DE-322)
