= VPB-202 =

Patrol Bombing Squadron 202
- Active: 15 September 1942 – 20 June 1945
- Country: United States of America
- Branch: United States Navy
- Type: squadron
- Role: Maritime patrol
- Engagements: World War II

Aircraft flown
- Patrol: PBM-3/C/S/D

VPB-202 was a Patrol Bombing Squadron of the U.S. Navy. The squadron was established as Patrol Squadron Two Hundred Two (VP-202) on 15 September 1942, redesignated Patrol Bombing Squadron Two Hundred Two (VPB-202) on 1 October 1944 and disestablished on 20 June 1945.

== Operational history ==
- 15 September 1942–January 1943: VP-202 was established at NAS Norfolk, Virginia, as a medium seaplane squadron flying the PBM-3 Mariner under the operational control of PatWing-5. The squadron remained at Norfolk in training and in November began receiving the newer PBM-3C with radar. Familiarization training, radar bombing, gunnery and navigation training continued through the end of January 1943.
- 8 February–November 1943: VP-202 relocated to NAS Key West, Florida, under the operational control of FAW-12. The aircraft were modified at this time to the "S" or "stripped" configuration. Armor plate, gun turrets and all excess gear was removed to lighten the aircraft and make room for more fuel storage to enable the aircraft to patrol further in the Anti-submarine warfare (ASW) role. A three-aircraft detachment was maintained at Grand Cayman, British West Indies, from 28 February through 18 November 1943. The squadron's principal duties were patrol and convoy coverage.
- 1–28 December 1943: VP-202 transferred to NAS Norfolk, under FAW-5, for refitting with new PBM-3Ds. The shakedown and familiarization training continued through the 27th. On 28 December the squadron began ferrying its new aircraft to NAS San Diego, California, as a stopover en route to NAS Kaneohe Bay, Hawaii.
- 7–22 January 1944: VP-202 deployed in elements of three aircraft to NAS Kaneohe Bay. On 15 January the squadron began departing in elements to Tarawa, under the operational control of FAW-2. The squadron was the first combat squadron of Mariner seaplanes to operate in the Pacific theater. While on Tarawa the squadron patrolled the Japanese-held Marshall and Caroline islands. On 31 January Japanese airfields in the Taroa Island group were bombed and strafed in a night raid.
- 1 February 1944: VP-202 relocated to Majuro, in the Gilbert-Ellice Island area. From this base the squadron flew missions against Ponape. These raids were the first ever made against the Japanese installations on Ponape.
- 6 February 1944: The squadron was sent to Kwajalein Atoll, still under combat by opposing American and Japanese ground forces. One aircraft crashed during an attempted night landing, killing five of the crew.
- 24 February–June 1944: VP-202 relocated to Eniwetok on the heels of the invasion forces. The condition of the squadron's aircraft by this date was so poor that it was forced to return to Hawaii for much needed repairs. The squadron was relieved on 1 March for return to NAS Kaneohe Bay, with the last aircraft arriving on 15 March. Through mid-June VP-202 remained at NAS Kaneohe Bay with a detachment of three aircraft at Kwajalein. The squadron underwent maintenance and overhaul, with two 700 miles (1,100 km) sector searches assigned daily from NAS Kaneohe Bay.
- 15 June 1944: VP-202 deployed to NAB Ebeye, Kwajalein Atoll, with the last aircraft arriving on 25 June. The squadron remained under the operational control of FAW-2, CTG 49.3. Primary duties of the squadron were daily mail flights from Kwajalein to Saipan and Eniwetok. The Japanese shore batteries on Saipan at this time were still active. The squadron pilots would land 3,000-foot (910 m) from shore and watch the splashes of shells as the enemy gunners opened fire on them.
- 17 July–September 1944: The squadron relocated from Kwajalein to Saipan, with tender support provided by USS Chandeleur and USS Mackinac. A detachment of three crews and aircraft operated off USS Pocomoke with VP-16. This detachment was moved to USS Shelikof on 19 August to operate with VP-18. Constant patrols were flown over the islands of Guam, Rota, Pagan and the Bonin Islands, within 700 miles (1,100 km) of Tokyo. The wear and tear on the aircraft and particularly the engines began to show. The entire squadron stood down on 1 through 11 September for maintenance and overhaul.
- 12–19 September 1944: Squadron tenders USS Chandeleur and USS Pocomoke departed Saipan for Kossel Passage, Palau. The squadron followed and arrived on the 17th, coming under the operational control of FAW1. VP-202 was back in operation by the 19th, flying daylight patrols.
- 27 September 1944: VP-202 relocated to Ulithi, with tender services provided by USS Onslow. Duties at this location consisted of antishipping patrols and daylight searches.
- 18 October 1944: VPB-202 was relieved at Ulithi for return to Hawaii. Upon arrival on 30 October, squadron personnel enjoyed the rest facilities at the Royal Hawaiian Hotel while awaiting transportation back to the U.S. A CVE was loaded with squadron personnel and arrived at San Diego, California, on 21 November 1944. All personnel were given orders to new squadrons and home leave.
- 1 January–Jun 1945: VPB-202 reformed at NAS San Diego, under the operational control of FAW-14. It remained at San Diego in training until disestablished on 20 June 1945.

== Aircraft assignments ==
The squadron was assigned the following aircraft, effective on the dates shown:

- PBM-3 September 1942
- PBM-3C November 1942
- PBM-3S February 1943
- PBM-3D December 1943

== Home port assignments ==
The squadron was assigned to these home ports, effective on the dates shown:

- NAS Norfolk Virginia 15 September 1942
- NAS Key West, Florida 8 February 1943
- NAS Norfolk 1 December 1943
- NAS Kaneohe Bay, Hawaii January 1944
- NAS San Diego, California 21 November 1944

== See also ==
- Maritime patrol aircraft
- List of inactive United States Navy aircraft squadrons
- List of United States Navy aircraft squadrons
- List of squadrons in the Dictionary of American Naval Aviation Squadrons
- History of the United States Navy
