= USS Yakutat =

Tender of the United States Navy

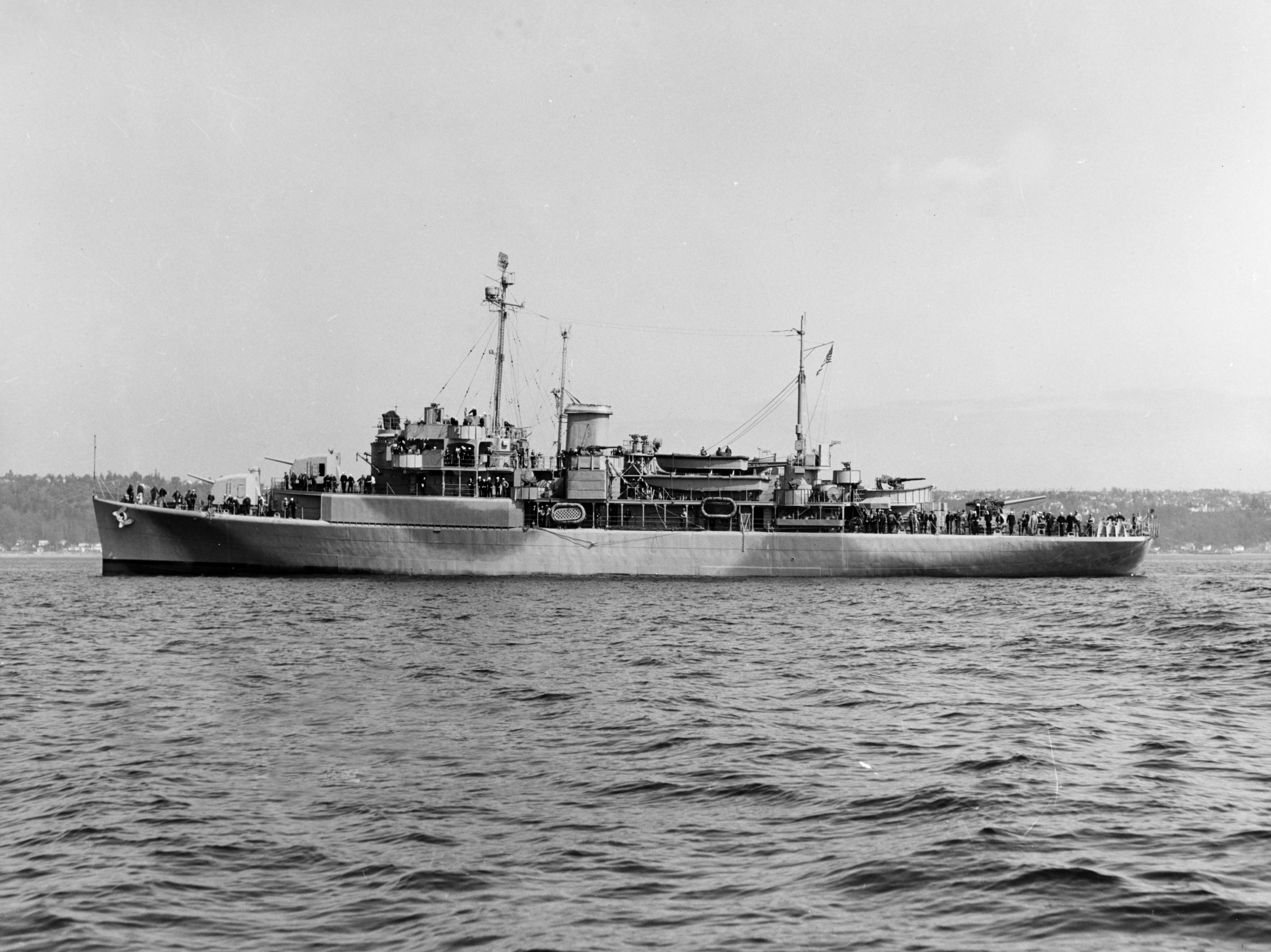
- USS Yakutat (AVP-32) on 30 March 1944

History

United States
- Name: USS Yakutat (AVP-32)
- Namesake: Yakutat Bay on the southern coast of Alaska
- Builder: Associated Shipbuilders, Inc., Seattle, Washington
- Laid down: 1 April 1942
- Launched: 2 July 1943
- Sponsored by: Mrs. Peter Barber
- Commissioned: 31 March 1944
- Decommissioned: 17 April 1946
- Nickname(s): "The Y"; "The Mighty Y"
- Honors and awards: Four battle stars for World War II service
- Fate: Loaned to U.S. Coast Guard 31 August 1948; permanently transferred to Coast Guard 26 September 1966
- Acquired: Transferred from U.S. Coast Guard 1 January 1971 (Note: Per the Dictionary of American Naval Fighting Ships (DANFS) and NavSource, Yakutat was transferred to the Navy sometime in 1970, but the Coast Guard Historian's Office placed her Coast Guard decommissioning date at 1 January 1971; her transfer to South Vietnam on 10 January 1971 (per both the DANFS and NavSource entries) suggests that might have been the date of both her return to the U.S. Navy and her transfer to South Vietnam, as these events happened simultaneously with her sister ships.)
- Fate: Transferred to South Vietnam 10 January 1971 (Note: Per the Dictionary of American Naval Fighting Ships and NavSource, although the Coast Guard Historian's office places the transfer date at 1 January 1971, which was simultaneous with her decommissioning. Given that her sisters were decommissioned, transferred to the Navy, and transferred simultaneously, and this may have been the case with Yakutat, and may have occurred on either 1 January 1971 or 10 January 1971.)

United States
- Name: USCGC Yakutat (WAVP-380)
- Namesake: Previous name retained
- Acquired: Loaned by United States Navy to Coast Guard 31 August 1948; Transferred permanently from Navy to Coast Guard 26 September 1966
- Commissioned: 23 November 1948
- Reclassified: High endurance cutter (WHEC-380) 1 May 1966
- Decommissioned: 1 January 1971 (Note: Per NavSource, the ship was returned to the Navy during 1970, but the U.S. Coast Guard Historian's Office places her Coast Guard decommissioning date at 1 January 1971.)
- Honors and awards: One award of the Navy Unit Commendation; One award of the Meritorious Unit Commendation; Four campaign stars for Vietnam War service
- Fate: Transferred to U.S. Navy 1 January 1971

South Vietnam
- Name: RVNS Trần Nhật Duật (HQ-03)
- Namesake: Trần Nhật Duật (1255–1330), a general of the Trần dynasty
- Acquired: 10 January 1971
- Fate: Fled to Philippines on collapse of South Vietnam April 1975; Formally transferred to Republic of the Philippines 5 April 1976

Philippines
- Acquired: 5 April 1976
- Commissioned: never
- Fate: Cannibilized for spare parts; Discarded 1982

General characteristics (seaplane tender)
- Class & type: Barnegat-class small seaplane tender
- Displacement: 1,766 tons (light); 2,750 tons (full load)
- Length: 311 ft 8 in (95.00 m)
- Beam: 41 ft 1 in (12.52 m)
- Draft: 13 ft 6 in (4.11 m)
- Installed power: 6,000 horsepower (4.48 megawatts)
- Propulsion: Diesel engines, two shafts
- Speed: 18.6 knots (34.4 km/h)
- Complement: 215 (ships' company); 367 (with aviation unit)
- Sensors & processing systems: Radar; sonar
- Armament: 3 × (as built), later 1 x, single 5-inch (120 mm) 38-caliber dual-purpose gun mount; 1 × quad 40 mm antiaircraft gun mount; 2 × dual 40 mm antiaircraft gun mounts; 4 × dual 20 mm guns antiaircraft gun mounts; 2 × depth charge tracks
- Aviation facilities: Supplies, spare parts, repairs, and berthing for one seaplane squadron; 80,000 US gallons (300,000 L) aviation fuel

General characteristics (Coast Guard cutter)
- Class & type: Casco-class cutter
- Displacement: 2,529 tons (full load) in 1966
- Length: 310 ft 9.25 in (94.7230 m) overall; 300 ft 0 in (91.44 m) between perpendiculars
- Beam: 41 ft 0 in (12.50 m) maximum
- Draft: 12 ft 11 in (3.94 m) at full load in 1966
- Installed power: 6,400 bhp (4,800 kW)
- Propulsion: Fairbanks-Morse geared diesel engines, two shafts; 165,625 US gallons (626,960 L) of fuel
- Speed: 17.6 knots (32.6 km/h) (maximum sustained in 1966); 11.0 knots (20.4 km/h) (economic in 1966)
- Range: 9,500 nautical miles (17,600 km) at 17.6 knots (32.6 km/h) in 1966; 20,000 nautical miles (37,000 km) at 11.0 knots (20.4 km/h) in 1966
- Complement: 151 (10 officers, 3 warrant officers, 138 enlisted personnel) in 1966
- Sensors & processing systems: Radars in 1966: SPS-23, SPS-29D; Sonar in 1966: SQS-1
- Armament: In 1966: 1 x single 5-inch (127 mm) 38-caliber Mark 12-1 gun mount; 1 x Mark 10-1 antisubmarine projector; 2 x Mark 32 Mod 2 torpedo launchers with 3 torpedo tubes each)

General characteristics (South Vietnamese frigate)
- Class & type: Trần Quang Khải-class frigate
- Displacement: 1,766 tons (standard); 2,800 tons (full load)
- Length: 310 ft 9 in (94.72 m) (overall); 300 ft 0 in (91.44 m) waterline
- Beam: 41 ft 1 in (12.52 m)
- Draft: 13 ft 5 in (4.09 m)
- Installed power: 6,080 horsepower (4.54 megawatts)
- Propulsion: 2 x Fairbanks Morse 38D diesel engines
- Speed: approximately 18 knots (maximum)
- Complement: approximately 200
- Armament: 1 × 5-inch/38-caliber (127-millimeter) dual-purpose gun; 1 or 2 x 81-millimeter mortars in some ships (Note: Sources do not specify which ships of the class mounted mortars or how many they mounted; see Jane's Fighting Ship 1973–1974, p. 592.); Several machine guns

USS Yakutat (AVP-32) was a United States Navy Barnegat-class small seaplane tender in commission from 1944 to 1946. Yakutat tended seaplanes in combat areas in the Pacific during the latter stages of World War II. After the war, she was in commission in the United States Coast Guard from 1948 to 1971 as the Coast Guard cutter USCGC Yakutat (WAVP-380), later WHEC-380, seeing service in the Vietnam War during her Coast Guard career. Transferred to South Vietnam in 1971, she was commissioned into the Republic of Vietnam Navy as the frigate RVNS Trần Nhật Duật (HQ-03). When South Vietnam collapsed in 1975 at the end of the Vietnam War, she fled to the Philippines, where the Philippine Navy took custody of her and cannibalized her for spare parts until discarding her in 1982.

== Construction and commissioning ==
August 1967 logbook of the USS Yakutat (AVP-32)

Yakutat (AVP-32) was laid down on 1 April 1942 at Seattle, Washington by Associated Shipbuilders, Inc. She was launched on 2 July 1942, sponsored by Mrs. Peter Barber, a mother who had lost three sons when the battleship USS Oklahoma (BB-37) was sunk on 7 December 1941 in the Japanese attack on Pearl Harbor, Hawaii, and was commissioned on 31 March 1944.

== United States Navy service ==
=== World War II ===
After her shakedown in the San Diego, area, Yakutat got underway on 25 May 1942 and arrived at San Pedro, California, late on 26 May 1944. Following post-shakedown availability in the West Coast Shipbuilders' yard at San Pedro, she departed for Pearl Harbor on 17 June 1944.

Yakutat reached Ford Island at Pearl Harbor on 24 June 1944. Underway again at 07:00 hours on 28 June 1944, she headed for the Marshall Islands as an escort for escort aircraft carrier USS Makin Island. Arriving at Kwajalein on 6 July 1944, she shifted to Eniwetok within a week, where she embarked officers and enlisted men of a patrol service unit and took on board a cargo of 5-inch (127 mm) illuminating ammunition. She departed for Saipan on 14 July 1944.

==== Saipan and Pelelieu ====
Reaching recently secured Tanapag Harbor on 17 July 1944, Yakutat began setting up a seaplane base there and immediately commenced servicing seaplanes, providing subsistence and quarters for the aviators and aircrews attached to those aircraft. She provided the aircraft with gasoline and lubricating oil via bowser fueling boats and commenced servicing planes by the over-the-stern method as well.

Yakutat remained at Tanapag Harbor for the rest of July, all of August, and into September 1944. After shifting to the Garapan anchorage on Saipan on 8 September 1944, she transferred all plane personnel to the seaplane tender USS Coos Bay and sailed for the Palau Islands on 12 September 1944. In company with the seaplane tenders USS Chandeleur, USS Pocomoke, USS Onslow, and USS Mackinac, Yakutat reached Kossol Passage on 16 September 1944, the day after the initial American landings on Pelelieu.

Proceeding to the seaplane operation area via a "comparatively well-marked channel" and "while sweeping operations went on continuously" nearby, Yakutat soon commenced laying out a seaplane anchorage. The following day, Yakutat serviced the first plane of Patrol Bomber Squadron 216 (VPB-216), furnishing aviation fuel and boat service.

With nine Martin PBM Mariner flying boats operational, VPB-216 was based on Yakutat, conducting long-range patrols and Anti-submarine warfare sweeps daily. During that time, Yakutat also served as secondary fighter director unit and experienced air alerts on six occasions. Japanese planes remained in the vicinity for varying lengths of time and occasionally dropped bombs in the lagoon area.

Yakutat serviced the VPB-216 planes into early November 1944. On 9 November 1944, she got underway for Ulithi Atoll and arrived there on 10 November 1944. Yakutat tended planes there from 13 November 1944 to 26 November 1944 before she underwent a drydocking for a routine bottom cleaning and hull repairs. She then sailed for Guam on 29 November 1944.

==== Saipan operations ====
Reaching Apra Harbor, Guam, on 30 November 1944, Yakutat loaded spare parts for Martin PBM Mariner flying boats before she got underway on 2 December 1944 to return to Saipan. She arrived later the same day, completed the discharge of her cargo on 4 December 1944 and, on 5 December 1944, took on board 13 officers and 30 enlisted men of VPB-216 for temporary subsistence.

Yakutat tended planes of Patrol Bomber Squadron 16 (VPB-16) and Patrol Bomber Squadron 17 (VPB-17) at Saipan through mid-January 1945. She departed Tanapag Harbor on the morning of 17 January 1945, steamed independently for Guam, and reached her destination later that day. However, she remained there only a short time, for she departed on 19 January 1945 for the Palau Islands and reached Kossol Roads on 21 January 1945. Yakutat discharged cargo there and fueled seaplanes until 6 February 1945, when she sailed in company with the seaplane tender USS St. George, escorted by the patrol craft USS PC-1130, bound for the Caroline Islands.

Anchoring at Ulithi Atoll on 7 February 1945, Yakutat tended seaplanes there for most of February 1945. Highlighting her brief stay there was her going to the vicinity of a crashed Vought OS2U Kingfisher floatplane on 10 February 1945. After salvaging equipment from the plane, Yakutat sank the plane with gunfire and returned to her anchorage in the seaplane operating area.

On 25 February 1944, Yakutat sailed for the Mariana Islands in company with St. George and reached Garapan harbor on 27 February 1945. She tended seaplanes there for a little less than a month before departing for Okinawa on 23 March 1945 to take part in Operation Iceberg, the conquest of the Ryūkyū Islands.

==== Supporting Operation Iceberg ====
Yakutat tended the PBM Mariners of Patrol Bomber Squadron 27 (VPB-27) for the rest of World War II. She established seadrome operations at Kerama Retto on 28 March 1945 and spent the rest of the important Okinawa campaign in seaplane tending duties. The presence of Japanese aircraft in the vicinity on numerous occasions meant many hours spent at general quarters stations, lookouts' eyes and radar alert for any sign of approaching enemy planes. Yakutat provided quarters and subsistence for the crews of the Mariners and furnished the planes with gasoline, lubricating oil, and jet-assisted take-off (JATO) units. The Mariners conducted antisubmarine and air-sea rescue ("Dumbo") duties locally, as well as offensive patrols that ranged as far as the coast of Korea.

Although Yakutat received a dispatch on 21 June 1945 to the effect that all "organized resistance on Okinawa has ceased," her routine remained busy. On 28 June 1945, for example, a Consolidated PB2Y Coronado flying boat crashed on take-off and sank approximately 500 yards (457 m) off the starboard beam of the ship. Yakutat dispatched two boats to the scene and rescued eight men, while boats from another ship rescued the remaining three survivors from the Coronado. All eleven men were brought on board Yakutat, where they were examined and returned to their squadron, Patrol Bomber Squadron 13 (VPB-13).

On 15 July 1945, Yakutat sailed for Chimu Bay, Okinawa in company with the seaplane tenders USS Norton Sound, Chandeleur, Onslow, USS Shelikof, and USS Bering Strait but returned to port due to a typhoon in the vicinity. However, she got underway again on 16 July 1945 and reached Chimu Bay the same day. She remained there, tending seaplanes, largely anchored but occasionally moving to open water to be free to maneuver when typhoons swirled by. On one occasion, while returning to Chimu Bay after a typhoon evacuation, Yakutat made sonar contact on a suspected submarine on 3 August 1945. She made one attack, dropping depth charges from her stern-mounted depth-charge tracks, but lost the contact soon thereafter.

Yakutat was at Chimu Bay when Japan capitulated and hostilities ended on 15 August 1945, bringing World War II to a close. With the officers and enlisted men of the crew assembled aft, Yakutat's commanding officer, Lieutenant Commander W. I. Darnell, led his crew in offering thanks to God "for being kept afloat to see the final day of this war."

==== Honors and awards ====
Yakutat earned four battle stars for her World War II service.

=== Post-World War II ===
Although V-J Day meant that offensive operations against the Japanese ceased, it only meant the beginning of the long occupation of Japan and its possessions. Yakutat remained at Chimu Bay for the rest of August and for most of September 1945, before she departed for Japanese home waters on 20 September 1945, escorting St. George.

En route, the two seaplane tenders caught up with Vice Admiral Jesse B. Oldendorf's Task Unit 56.4.3, formed around the battleships USS Tennessee and USS California, and became units of Task Force 56, and later, when redesignated, as Task Force 51.

Yakutat reached Wakanoura Wan, Honshū, on 22 September 1945, finding seaplane tender USS Floyds Bay already there and operating as a tender for seaplanes. Yakutat underwent a brief availability alongside destroyer tender USS Cascade before she commenced her seaplane tending operations at Wakanoura Wan. She operated as a tender for seaplanes using that port until 12 October 1945, when she shifted to Hiro Wan, where she performed seaplane tender operations and seadrome control duties for a little over a month.

Underway on 14 November 1945, Yakutat arrived at Sasebo, Japan, on 15 November 1945, stayed there until 19 November 1945.

On 19 November 1945, Yakutat departed Sasebo for the United States with 58 officers and 141 enlisted men embarked as passengers. After stopping at Midway Atoll for fuel on 27 November 1945, she continued on, bound for the Pacific Northwest.

=== Decommissioning ===
Reaching Port Townsend, Washington, on 6 December 1945, Yakutat transferred all her passengers to landing craft infantry USS LCI-957 for further transportation, then shifted to Sinclair Inlet, Washington, where she offloaded all bombs and ammunition before reporting on 7 December 1945 to the Bremerton Group of the Pacific Reserve Fleet at Bremerton, Washington. Yakutat subsequently shifted south to the naval air station at Alameda, California, where she was decommissioned on 29 July 1946.

== United States Coast Guard service ==
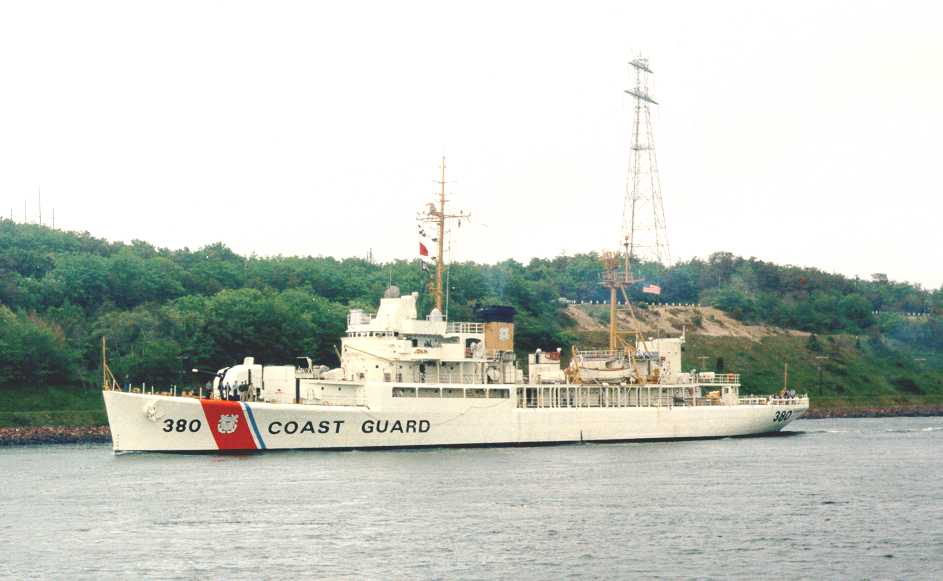
USCGC Yakutat (WHEC-380), ex-WAVP-380, in 1969.

Barnegat-class ships were very reliable and seaworthy and had good habitability. The Coast Guard viewed them as ideal for ocean station duty, in which they would perform weather reporting and search and rescue tasks, once they were modified by having a balloon shelter added aft and having oceanographic equipment, an oceanographic winch, and a hydrographic winch installed. After World War II, the U.S. Navy transferred 18 of the ships to the Coast Guard, in which they were known as the Casco-class cutters.

The Navy loaned Yakutat to the Coast Guard on 31 August 1948. In September 1948, she was towed to the Hunters Point Naval Shipyard in San Francisco, California, where she underwent conversion for service as a weather-reporting ship. The Coast Guard commissioned her as USCGC Yakutat (WAVP-380) at San Francisco on 23 November 1948.

=== North Atlantic operations 1949–1967 ===
Proceeding from San Francisco via the Panama Canal and Kingston, Jamaica, Yakutat eventually commenced ocean station patrol duties in the North Atlantic Ocean, based at Portland, Maine, in late January 1949. Her primary duty was to gather meteorological data. While on duty in one of these stations, she was required to patrol a 210-square-mile (544-square-kilometer) area for three weeks at a time, leaving the area only when physically relieved by another Coast Guard cutter or in the case of a dire emergency. While on station, she acted as an aircraft check point at the point of no return, a relay point for messages from ships and aircraft, as a source of the latest weather information for passing aircraft, as a floating oceanographic laboratory, and as a search-and-rescue ship for downed aircraft and vessels in distress, and she engaged in law enforcement operations.

Yakutat shifted her home port to New Bedford, Massachusetts, later in 1949, and operated out of New Bedford until 1971, continuing her ocean station patrols. Periodically, she conducted naval refresher training in company with U.S. Navy ships out of Guantanamo Bay, Cuba.

In February 1952, Yakutat proceeded to the scene of an unusual maritime disaster that occurred off Cape Cod, Massachusetts. Two commercial tankers – SS Fort Mercer and SS Pendleton – each broke in two and sank almost simultaneously. Yakutat, as the ship in tactical command of the rescue efforts, consequently picked up men from both ships and directed the rescue efforts of other participating vessels in the vicinity. Members of her crew were awarded one gold and five silver Lifesaving Medals for their achievements in this rescue operation. The Finest Hours a 2016 film was made about the rescue operations.

In December 1952, Yakutat rescued survivors of a plane crash off the entrance to St. George's Harbor, Bermuda, with her small boats.

On 14 September 1953, Yakutat performed emergency repairs by constructing a concrete bulkhead aboard and pumping the bilges of the Spanish merchant ship Marte, which had a large hole at the waterline, about 750 nautical miles (1,390 km) southeast of Naval Station Argentia, Newfoundland, Canada.

In the autumn of 1955, Yakutat assisted the Portuguese fishing vessel Jose Alberto.

Yakutat assisted the damaged Liberian merchant ship Bordabere 400 nautical miles (740 km) south of Cape Race, Newfoundland, between 27 April 1965 and 3 May 1965. Yakutat's crew shored up Bordabere, pumped out seawater that had flooded her, and escorted her to Halifax, Nova Scotia, Canada.

In late November 1965, Yakutat assisted the American merchant ships American Pilot and Maumee Sun after they collided west of the Cape Cod Canal.

Yakutat was reclassified as a high endurance cutter and redesignated WHEC-380 on 1 May 1966. On 26 September 1966, her Navy loan to the Coast Guard came to an end and she was transferred permanently from the Navy to the Coast Guard.

=== Vietnam War service 1967–1968 ===
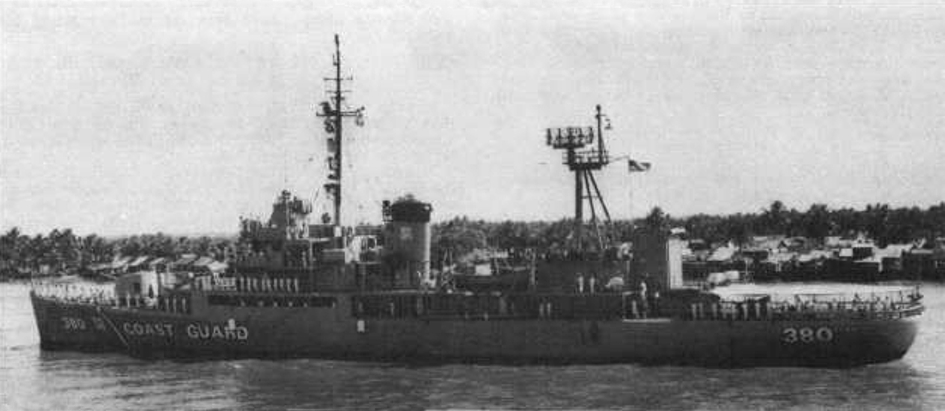
USCGC Yakutat (WHEC-380) during her Vietnam War service.

In 1967, Yakutat was assigned to Coast Guard Squadron Three, which was designated Task Unit 70.8.6. The squadron was activated at Pearl Harbor, Hawaii, on 24 April 1967 when its commander, Captain John E. Day, hoisted his pennant aboard his flagship, the Coast Guard cutter USCGC Gresham.

Coast Guard Squadron Three was tasked to operate, in conjunction with U.S. Navy forces, in Operation Market Time, the interdiction of North Vietnamese arms and munitions traffic along the coastline of South Vietnam during the Vietnam War. The squadron's other Vietnam War duties included fire support for ground forces, resupplying Coast Guard and Navy patrol boats, and search-and-rescue operations. Serving in the squadron with Gresham and Yakutat were the cutters USCGC Bering Strait, USCGC Barataria and USCGC Half Moon; like Yakutat and Gresham, they all were former Navy Barnegat-class ships. They departed Pearl Harbor on 26 April 1967 and reported to Commander, United States Seventh Fleet, for Market Time duty on 4 May 1967. They were joined by Navy radar picket destroyer escorts (DERs) of Escort Squadrons 5 and 7.

The ten Market Time ships arrived at Subic Bay in the Philippines on 10 May 1967. The five Coast Guard cutters and five Navy destroyer escorts continuously manned four Market Time stations off Vietnam, while only Navy warships served on two Taiwan patrol stations. One ship rotated duty as the station ship in Hong Kong. Yakutat remained in the Western Pacific until 1 January 1968, then returned to the United States.

==== Honors and awards ====
Yakutat earned two campaign stars during this Vietnam War tour, for:

- Vietnamese Counteroffensive – Phase II 31 May 1967
- Vietnamese Counteroffensive – Phase III 1 July 1967 – 18 December 1967

=== North Atlantic service 1968–1970 ===
Yakutat returned to her routine North Atlantic duties out of New Bedford in 1968. On 28 February 1969 she suffered minor damage when the fishing vessel Seafreeze Atlantic collided with her while docking at New Bedford.

=== Vietnam War service 1970 ===
In 1970, Yakutat was reassigned to Coast Guard Squadron Three for a second tour of duty in Vietnam, and resumed her Operation Market Time duties on 17 May 1970. She completed her tour on 31 December 1970.

==== Honors and awards ====
Yakutat earned two more campaign stars during this Vietnam War tour, for:

- Sanctuary Counteroffensive 10 June 1970 – 30 June 1970
- Vietnamese Counteroffensive – Phase VII 1 July 1970 – 6 July 1970, 16 July 1970 to 19 July 1970, 30 July 1970 – 7 August 1970, 17 August 1970 – 22 August 1970, 24 August 1970 – 28 August 1970, 27 October 1970 – 6 November 1970, and 22 November 1970 – 1 January 1971

=== Other awards ===
Yakutat also received a Navy Unit Commendation and a Meritorious Unit Commendation during her Coast Guard career.

=== Decommissioning ===
The Coast Guard decommissioned Yakutat on 1 January 1971 in South Vietnam and transferred her to the U.S. Navy. (Note: Per DANFS and NavSource, Yakutat was transferred to the Navy sometime in 1970, but the Coast Guard Historian's Office places her Coast Guard decommissioning date at 1 January 1971; her transfer to South Vietnam on 10 January 1971 (per both the Dictionary of American Naval Fighting Ships and NavSource entries) suggests that that might have been the date of both her return to the U.S. Navy and her transfer to South Vietnam, as these events happened simultaneously with her sister ships.)

== Republic of Vietnam Navy service ==
After her antisubmarine warfare equipment had been removed, the U.S. Navy transferred Yakutat to South Vietnam on 10 January 1971, and she was commissioned into the Republic of Vietnam Navy as the frigate RVNS Trần Nhật Duật (HQ-03). (Note: Per Janes's Fighting Ships 1973–1974, p. 592, "HQ" is an abbreviation for "Hai Quan", Vietnamese for "Navy", used for all Republic of Vietnam Navy ships.) (Note: This article assumes that the authoritative Jane's Fighting Ships 1973–1974, p. 592, is correct about the ship's designation in South Vietnamese service as HQ-03; the Dictionary of American Naval Fighting Ships (DANFS, NavSource, and the Inventory of VNN's Battle Ships Part 1 (see Part 1 at .vnafmamn.com) agree. However, Conway's All the World's Fighting Ships 1947–1982 Part II: The Warsaw Pact and Non-Aligned Nations, p. 369, states that the ship's South Vietnamese designation was HQ-16, which the other sources state was the designation assigned to her sister ship RVNS Lý Thường Kiệt (HQ-16). The United States Coast Guard Historian's Office is silent on her designation in South Vietnamese service.) By mid-1972, six other former Casco-class cutters had joined her in South Vietnamese service, and they were known as the Trần Quang Khải-class frigates. They were the largest warships in the South Vietnamese inventory, and their 5-inch (127-millimeter) guns were South Vietnam's largest naval guns. Trần Nhật Duật and her sisters fought alongside U.S. Navy ships during the final years of the Vietnam War, patrolling the South Vietnamese coast and providing gunfire support to South Vietnamese forces ashore.

When South Vietnam's collapse begain to look eminent in early 1975, DAO liaison officer and future Deputy Secretary of State Richard Armitage was sent to meet with Captain Kiem Do, the RVNN Deputy Chief of Staff, to discuss how to prevent the former U.S. ships and technology from falling into the Vietnam People's Navy's hands. Armitage and Do worked to convince as many captains of those ships as they could to refuse to surrender their commands and meet at Côn Sơn Island 150 miles south of Saigon where the plan was that their ships would be scuttled and the crews picked up by the U.S. Navy.

Armitage and Do had an unspoken understanding that none of those captains or their crews would leave their families behind, so when Armitage arrived aboard the USS Kirk to facilitate the rescue of those captains and their crew as part of the U.S. Navy's larger Operation Frequent Wind, they found 35 former U.S. Navy and Coast Guard ships and some 50 private cargo and fishing vessels crammed full with 30,000 refugees. They had no choice but to allow Trần Nhật Duật's final mission to be serving as Captain Do's flagship as senior officer of the RVNN convoy sailing 1,000 miles (1,600 km) across the China Sea to U.S. Naval Base Subic Bay in the Philippines where Trần Nhật Duật would strike her colors one final time, handing over command to Armitage to enter Philippine waters repatriated under the U.S. flag. From there, most of the refugees ultimately emigrated to the United States.

A U.S. Coast Guard team inspected Trần Nhật Duật and her sister ships in May 1975 following their exodus. One of the inspectors noted: "These vessels brought in several hundred refugees and are generally rat-infested. They are in a filthy, deplorable condition. Below decks generally would compare with a garbage scow."

== Acquisition for spare parts by the Philippines ==
The United States formally transferred Trần Nhật Duật to the Philippines on 5 April 1976. She did not enter Philippine Navy service; instead she and her sister ship RVNS Trần Quốc Toản (HQ-06) were cannibalized for spare parts to allow the Philippines to keep four other sister ships in commission in the Philippine Navy, in which they were known as the Andrés Bonifacio-class frigates.

The former Trần Nhật Duật was discarded in 1982 and probably scrapped.
