= VPB-197 =

Patrol Bombing Squadron 197
- Active: 1 September 1938 – 1 April 1946
- Country: United States of America
- Branch: United States Navy
- Type: squadron
- Role: Maritime patrol
- Engagements: World War II

Aircraft flown
- Patrol: P2Y-3; PBY-4/5/5A; PB4Y-1

VPB-197 was a Patrol Bombing Squadron of the U.S. Navy. The squadron was established as Patrol Squadron 21 (VP-21) on 1 September 1938, redesignated Patrol Squadron 45 (VP-45) on 1 July 1939, redesignated Patrol Squadron 14 (VP-14) on 1 December 1939, redesignated Patrol Squadron 26 (VP-26) on 15 April 1941, redesignated Patrol Squadron 14 (VP-14) on 1 July 1941, redesignated Patrol Bombing Squadron 14 (VPB-14) on 1 October 1944, redesignated Patrol Bombing Squadron 197 (VPB-197) on 2 December 1944 and disestablished on 1 April 1946.

== Operational history ==
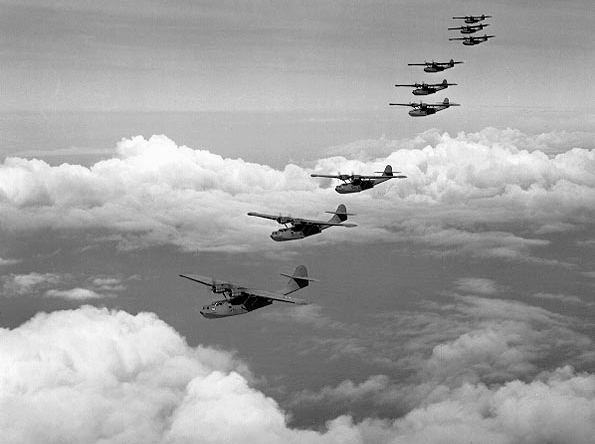
VP-14 PBY-5s, November 1941

- 1 September 1938: VP-21 was established at FAB Pearl Harbor, Hawaii, under the operational control of PatWing-2.
- 27 June 1939: VP-21 had been detailed in May 1939 to NAS San Diego, California, to pick up 15 new PBY-4s from the factory. The trans-Pacific flight back to Pearl Harbor was completed on this date without mishap.
- 1 July 1939: Due to the reorganization of patrol squadrons, VP-21 was redesignated VP-45 and assigned to PatWing-4 shortly after its return from the US with new aircraft.
- 1 December 1939: VP-45 was redesignated VP-14.
- 1 March 1940: The expansion of patrol squadrons due to the threat of war resulted in the splitting of several existing squadrons to create the core of new squadrons. VP-14 was split to help form a new patrol squadron, VP-13, also stationed at Pearl Harbor. Both squadrons were then quickly brought up to full strength with the addition of new aircraft and personnel.
- 1 December 1940: VP-14 was transferred to NAS San Diego, under PatWing-1 operational control. Upon arrival a period of intense training was commenced, bringing all new aircrews in the squadron up to full readiness. The training continued through 1 March 1941 when the squadron was officially reassigned to NAS Kanoehe Bay, Hawaii and PatWing-2's operational control.
- 14 April 1941: The squadron returned to Pearl Harbor, Hawaii, with new PBY-5s and combat-ready aircrews. Upon arrival, the squadron briefly shared facilities with VP-20. The recent expansion of patrol aviation assets had created the need for matching expansion of ground facilities at Pearl Harbor.
- 15 April – 1 July 1941: VP-14 was redesignated VP-26 and relocated to the recently completed facilities at NAS Kaneohe Bay. The squadron maintained the VP-26 designation for only a few months and on 1 July 1941 it was redesignated VP-14 again.
- 23 November 1941: VP-14 had flown to NAS San Diego earlier in the month for replacement of its older aircraft. New PBY-5s were picked up at the factory for the trans-Pacific flight back to Hawaii. The squadron returned to NAS Kaneohe Bay on this date.
- 7 December 1941: Prior to the onset of the Attack on Pearl Harbor the squadron had launched three aircraft for routine patrol. Squadron aircraft 14-P-1, flown by Ensign William P. Tanner, spotted a Japanese midget submarine at the entrance to the harbor and assisted USS Ward in sinking the intruder. The Japanese plan had been to drop off the midget submarines 5 miles (8.0 km) to 10 miles (16 km) from Pearl Harbor, passing through the entrance to the harbor 20 minutes before sunrise. They were to surface when the air attack began, shoot both torpedoes and then depart the harbor. Lieutenant Naoji Iwasa, whose midget submarine had been released by I-22, was sunk by Ward and Ensign Tanner. Iwasa had tried to follow the tug Antares through the harbor entrance while Antares had a barge in tow. During the attack on Pearl Harbor seven of the squadron's aircraft were destroyed on the ground and three were badly damaged. While surprised by the attack, ground crews strove to save their aircraft, pulling them from burning hangars. Despite his wounds, Aviation Ordnance Chief John W. Finn was credited with shooting down an attacking Japanese aircraft, one of the three shot down at NAS Kaneohe Bay that day. He was later awarded the Medal of Honor for his bravery under fire and for leading the efforts to save the remaining squadron aircraft.
- 17 December 1941: By this date the squadron was again operational with replacement aircraft flown in from the US.
- 7 January 1942: One aircraft was sent on detachment to Palmyra Atoll and a second was sent to Johnston Atoll to conduct sector searches of the approaches to the Hawaiian islands. On 12 January a third aircraft was detached to Hilo. At this point there was great concern that the Japanese would attempt to follow up on their successful attack with an invasion of the islands.
- 7 February 1942: As the Japanese continued their victorious advance to the South Pacific, the Allies consolidated as many assets as possible to meet the threat. VP-14 sent a detachment of six aircraft to bases at Suva and Nouméa, while the remainder of the squadron continued sector searches from NAS Kaneohe Bay. On 4 March 1942, two additional aircraft were sent to assist the detachment at Nouméa.
- 19 March – 1 April 1942: Two of the aircraft detached to Nouméa returned to NAS Kaneohe Bayfor refit, followed on the 25th by four more. The squadron concentrated on maintenance and crew training during this period. On 1 April 1942, the 11 war-weary aircraft in the squadron's inventory were transferred to other squadrons, leaving the squadron with only two operational aircraft at NAS Kaneohe Bay.
- 18 April 1942: The last two squadron aircraft from the Nouméa detachment returned to NAS Kaneohe Bay.
- 10 May 1942: A squadron detachment of six aircraft was sent to Nouméa with one remaining at NAS Kaneohe Bay. By 1 July 1942, the inventory of squadron aircraft had increased to 10, with 7 at Kaneohe and 3 at Nouméa.
- 26 August 1942: Lieutenant Robert B. Clark was awarded the Navy Cross for his actions on 26 August 1942. While flying a patrol mission Lieutenant Clark reported the position of an enemy task force north of the Solomon Islands while his aircraft was engaging an attack by eight enemy Mitsubishi A6M Zero fighters. By superb handing of his aircraft he was able to maneuver his plane in a position which enabled his waist gunners to shoot down two of the enemy planes and drive off the others. Despite serious damage to his plane and casualties among his crew, he made a difficult crash landing at Ontong Java Atoll. He managed the meager resources available on the island and after seven days he and his crew were rescued.
- 15 September 1942: By this date VP-14 had 11 aircraft total, all at NAS Kaneohe Bay. The squadron completed its refitting by 1 October 1942, replacing worn out aircraft with new stateside replacements and completing overhauls on remaining equipment. The new squadron aircraft were the amphibious version of the Catalina, the PBY-5A.
- 30 November 1942: After completion of the shakedown period for the new aircraft, VP-14 sent a detachment of six aircraft to various advance bases around the Hawaiian islands, keeping the remainder at NAS Kaneohe Bay. The detachments returned to NAS Kaneohe on 1 January 1943. 15 Feb 1943: Some of VP-14's personnel were reassigned to form the nucleus for a new land-bomber squadron. The remainder of VP-14 personnel reformed at NAS Kaneohe Bay with new crews to replace those lost in the reassignment and establishment of a new squadron.
- 14 June 1943: After the new crews had been trained the squadron was brought up to operational status once more and detachments were deployed to advance bases on Midway Island. Those remaining at NAS Kaneohe Bay participated in daily patrols and operational training. The detachments returned to NAS Kaneohe Bay on 3 July 1943.
- 9 August 1943: A detachment of five aircraft and six crews deployed to NAF Kanton Island. The detachment returned to NAS Kaneohe Bay at the end of the month.
- 1 September 1943: VP-14 deployed as a squadron to Luganville Seaplane Base, Espiritu Santo, departing in increments of three aircraft. By 24 September 1943, nine aircraft had arrived on the island, coming under the operational control of FAW-1.
- 1 October – December 1943: The nine VP-14 aircraft and crews were detached to operate with the tender USS Wright in the Segond Channel until the remainder of the squadron arrived. The last aircraft landed at Espiritu Santo on 8 October 1943 and the squadron then began daily searches, anti-shipping patrols and Dumbo (air-sea rescue) missions in the vicinity of Espiritu Santo. These missions were continued through 9 December 1943.
- 10 December 1943: VP-14 relieved VP-23 aboard USS Chandeleur at Halavo Seaplane Base, Florida Islands.
- 28 December 1943: A detachment of four aircraft and five crews deployed to Coos Bay, Treasury Islands, as an advance echelon.
- 1 January 1944: The remainder of the squadron moved to the tender USS Wright at Rendova Island, Treasury Islands. Both squadron and detachment aircraft participated in Dumbo missions and snooper patrols in the area surrounding the Treasury Islands.
- 17 January 1944: Squadron personnel aboard USS Wright were relocated to Hawthorn Sound, New Georgia. Their mission, and that of the detachment at Coos Bay, continued to consist of Dumbo missions and patrol searches.
- 1 February – March 1944: The Coos Bay detachment rejoined the squadron at Hawthorn Sound, and the squadron provided support to surface forces during the landing on Green and Emirau islands, which continued through 31 March 1944.
- 18 April 1944: USS Wright, which had served as home for the squadron since January, was replaced by USS Pocomoke. The shortage of accommodations resulted in three aircraft and four crews being detached to USS Chincoteague at the Treasury Islands, with the balance of the squadron temporarily based ashore at Halavo Bay.
- 25 May 1944: The Treasury Island detachment rejoined the squadron at Hawthorn Bay. The entire squadron began aircraft overhaul and refits that lasted through 31 May 1944.
- 1 June 1944: Six aircraft and six crews were detached to Green Island for patrol duty in conjunction with VP-91, based aboard USS Chincoteague and USS Coos Bay. On 5 June 1944, the detachment was enlarged with the addition of three more aircraft. All detachment aircraft returned to Halavo Bay to rejoin the rest of the squadron on 8 June 1944.
- 12 June 1944: VP-14 was relieved by VP-44 at Hawthorn Sound, New Georgia. The squadron began the long journey of island-hopping back to NAS Kaneohe Bay.
- 15 August 1944: After shore leave, the squadron was reformed at NAS Kaneohe Bay for training in preparation for another combat tour.
- 1 October 1944: VP-14 was redesignated VPB-14 and within a short period of time all personnel were shipped back to the continental U.S. for conversion training from seaplanes to landplanes.
- 2 December 1944: VPB-14 was redesignated VPB-197 and the squadron was transferred to NAAS Camp Kearney, California, under the operational control of FAW-14, for completion of training on the PB4Y-1 Liberator and a new mission assignment. The new mission was to train replacement crews on the PB4Y-1 before their assignment overseas. An additional duty included regular flights to Oahu, Hawaii, for the transportation of high-priority cargo and VIPs.
- 1 April 1946: VPB-197 was disestablished at NAAS Camp Kearney.

== Aircraft assignments ==
The squadron was assigned the following aircraft, effective on the dates shown:

- P2Y-3 - September 1938
- PBY-4 - June 1939
- PBY-5 - April 1941
- PBY-5A - October 1942
- PB4Y-1 - October 1944

== Home port assignments ==
The squadron was assigned to these home ports, effective on the dates shown:

- FAB Pearl Harbor, Hawaii - 1 September 1938
- NAS San Diego, California - 1 December 1940
- NAS Kaneohe Bay, Hawaii - 15 Apr 1941
- NAS San Diego - October 1944
- NAAS Camp Kearney, California - 2 December 1944

== See also ==
- Maritime patrol aircraft
- List of inactive United States Navy aircraft squadrons
- List of United States Navy aircraft squadrons
- List of squadrons in the Dictionary of American Naval Aviation Squadrons
- History of the United States Navy
