= USS Onslow =

Tender of the United States Navy

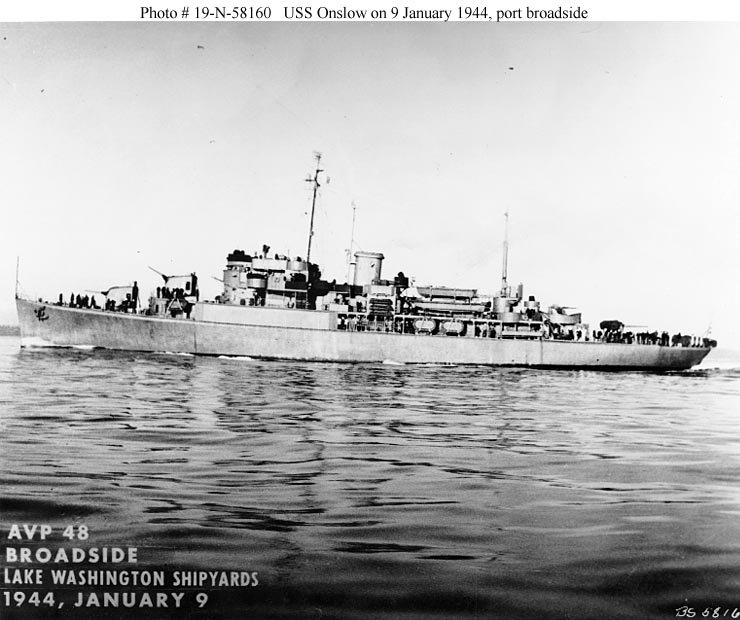
- USS Onslow (AVP-48) off Houghton, Washington, on 9 January 1944

History

United States
- Name: USS Onslow
- Namesake: Onslow Bay on the coast of North Carolina
- Builder: Lake Washington Shipyard, Houghton, Washington
- Laid down: 18 May 1942
- Launched: 20 September 1942
- Sponsored by: Mrs. W. W. Fitts
- Commissioned: 22 December 1943
- Decommissioned: June 1947
- Recommissioned: January 1951
- Decommissioned: 22 April 1960
- Stricken: 1 June 1960
- Honors and awards: Four battle stars for World War II service; One battle star for Korean War service
- Fate: Sold 18 October 1960; Entered service as commercial ferry

General characteristics
- Class & type: Barnegat-class small seaplane tender
- Displacement: 1,766 tons (light); 2,750 tons (full load)
- Length: 310 ft 9 in (94.72 m)
- Beam: 41 ft 2 in (12.55 m)
- Draught: 13 ft 6 in (4.11 m)
- Installed power: 6,000 horsepower (4.48 megawatts)
- Propulsion: Diesel engines, two shafts
- Speed: 18.6 knots (34.4 km/h)
- Complement: 215 (ship's company); 367 (including aviation unit)
- Sensors & processing systems: Radar; sonar
- Armament: 1 × 5 in (130 mm) gun mount; 1 × quad 40 mm antiaircraft gun mounts; 2 × twin 40-millimeter antiaircraft gun mountss; 6 × 20 mm antiaircraft guns; 2 × depth charge tracks
- Aviation facilities: Supplies, spare parts, repairs, and berthing for one seaplane squadron; 80,000 US gallons (300,000 L)

USS Onslow (AVP-48) was a United States Navy Barnegat-class seaplane tender in commission from 1943 to 1947 and from 1951 to 1960.

== Constructioning and commissioning ==
Onslow was laid down on 18 May 1942 by Lake Washington Shipyard at Houghton, Washington. She was launched on 20 September 1942, sponsored by Mrs. W. W. Fitts, and commissioned on 22 December 1943.

== World War II operations 1944-1945 ==
After shakedown, Onslow departed the United States West Coast on 19 March 1944. She stopped at Pearl Harbor, Hawaii, and Majuro before reporting for duty with Task Group 57.3 at Kwajalein.

=== The seizure of Ujelang ===
On 20 April 1944, Onslow was given the task of seizing Ujelang, a small island in the Marshall Islands occupied by Japanese troops. Embarking troops of the United States Army's 111th Infantry Regiment she rendezvoused with minesweeper USS YMS–91 on 21 April 1944. On the morning of 22 April 1944, 160 soldiers were put ashore to capture the island. They met resistance at the center of the island from 18 entrenched Japanese soldiers, who were killed, with no American casualties. During this time, Onslow came under attack by a twin-engined Mitsubishi G4M "Betty" bomber, which she drove off with 5-inch (127 mm) antiaircraft fire.

=== Operations at Kwajalein and Eniwetok ===
Onslow returned to Kwajalein on 25 April 1944 and spent the next six weeks there engaged in seaplane tending duties. She then was sent to Eniwetok, arriving there on 10 June 1944.

=== Supporting landings on Saipan ===
On 15 June 1944, in company with destroyer USS Downes (DD-375), Onslow escorted seaplane tender USS Pocomoke (AV-9) to Saipan. While on this passage she rescued a downed fighter pilot who was adrift in a raft, 25 nautical miles (46 km) off Saipan.

On 18 June 1944, three days after the initial landings on Saipan, Onslow took up duties tending the seaplanes of Patrol Squadron 16 (VP-16).

On the morning of 10 September 1944, two Japanese swam from Saipan and succeeded in climbing aboard one of the moored seaplanes undetected. They proceeded to blow the plane up with hand grenades, and Onslow dispatched a boat to assist the plane's crew. The boat was driven back under fire, but two additional boats joined in and they were then able to reach the plane and kill the boarders. However, gunfire set the plane's fuel ablaze, destroying it, although its crew was saved.

=== Operations in the Palau Islands ===
Onslow and seaplane tenders USS Pocomoke, USS Chandeleur (AV-10), USS Yakutat (AVP-32), and USS Mackinac (AVP-13) departed Saipan on 12 September 1944 to participate in the invasion of the Palau Islands. At noon on 16 September 1944 the formation entered Naval Base Kossol Passage. The five ships tended seaplanes there under adverse conditions that included floating mines, dangerous coral heads, and rough water, not to mention the presence of enemy airplanes and submarines.

On 13 November 1944, Onslow sped out to recover a Martin PBM Mariner flying boat down at sea with engine failure and towed it 275 nautical miles (509 km) to Ulithi Atoll. She then returned to Kossol Passage.

On 12 January 1945, three Japanese midget submarines entered the harbor, and the ships spent the day dodging coral heads trying to ferret out the elusive little submarines. One of the midget submarines was sunk; the other two escaped.

=== Operations at Saipan ===
On 17 January 1945, Onslow moved to Ulithi Atoll, and on 19 January 1945 she steamed for Guam. She then spent two months at Saipan beginning on 20 January 1945, providing services to CASU 48 bowser boats and the crews of two crash boats.

=== Supporting the invasion of Okinawa ===
On 23 March 1945, Onslow got underway for the invasion of Okinawa. Along with seaplane tenders USS Yakutat, USS Shelikof (AVP-52), and USS Bering Strait (AVP-34), she escorted seaplane tenders USS Hamlin (AV-15), USS St. George (AV-16), and USS Chandeleur from Saipan to Kerama Retto, arriving there on 28 March 1945. Upon anchoring, the ships began to lay out a seadrome and by 29 March 1945, were operating on a regular schedule with 60 PBM Mariner seaplanes.

Onslow's work at Kerama Retto was more difficult than ever before. Many of the seaplanes were damaged by the Japanese or by heavy seas. Because of their frequency, it became necessary for the seaplane tenders to ignore Japanese air raids at times. On one occasion Onslow assisted in shooting down a Japanese fighter which was making a dive on her.

Beginning about 1 June 1945, many of Japanese troops isolated on the small islands off Okinawa began coming to the beaches to surrender. When they did, Onslow notified the proper commands and often furnished shallow-draft boats to assist the U.S. Army in picking up the surrendering Japanese.

On 6 August 1945, Onslow received orders to escort Chandeleur to Eniwetok via Saipan. She transferred all patrol squadron personnel and equipment to seaplane tender USS Duxbury Bay (AVP-38) and departed Okinawa. Hostilities with Japan ceased and World War II came to an end on 15 August 1945, the same day she entered port at Eniwetok.

=== Honors and awards ===
Onslow earned four battle stars for her service in World War II, for:

- Marshall Islands operation, March 1944-April 1944
- Marianas operation: Capture and occupation of Saipan, 14 June 1944 – 27 August 1944
- Western Caroline Islands operation: Capture and occupation of southern Palau Islands, 16 September 1944 – 13 November 1944
- Okinawa Gunto operation: Assault and occupation of Okinawa Gunto, 28 March 1945 – 6 August 1945

== Peacetime service 1945-1947 ==
With the end of the war, Onslow took up duties as part of Operation Magic Carpet, the return of U.S. military personnel overseas to the United States. She embarked military personnel at Eniwetok and transported them to Pearl Harbor and the United States West Coast.

Onslow remained active for some time following the end of the war, participating in occupation duties in East Asia until 10 January 1947, when she returned to the United States for inactivation. She was decommissioned in June 1947 and placed in reserve.

== Korean War service 1951-1953 and peacetime service 1953-1960 ==
Onslow was reactivated in January 1951 to serve in the Korean War. She operated on a rotational basis, finishing four tours in the Western Pacific prior to 1955. During these tours, she spent most of her time in Iwakuni, Japan, tending seaplanes. She also provided services during the initial establishment of the Naval Air Station there in 1952.

Onslow earned one battle star for her service in the Korean War, for Korean Defense Summer-Fall 1952 13 May 1952 – 22 May 1952 and 17 June 1952 – 27 June 1952

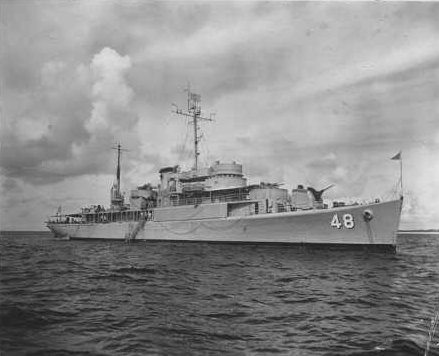
USS Onslow (AVP-48) in the Pescadores ca. 1956–1957.

Between 24 June 1955 and 3 April 1956, Onslow had a long tour of duty on the U.S. West Coast, homeported at Alameda, California. Following this she began another Western Pacific tour, serving as the station ship in Hong Kong until August 1957.

Returning to the United States again, Onslow provided services for various commands on the U.S. West Coast, with interim periods for upkeep and training.

== Final decommissioning ==
Onslow was decommissioned for the second and final time on 22 April 1960 and was struck from the Naval Vessel Register on 1 June 1960. She was sold on 18 October 1960 to the Philippine Presidents Line, Inc., for use as a commercial ferry.

Still in service as a ferry in the Philippines in 1975, the former Onslow was among the ships that the U.S. Navy hired to assist in the evacuation of refugees from South Vietnam upon the collapse of that country at the end of the Vietnam War in April of that year.
