= VPB-44 =

Patrol Bombing Squadron of the United States Navy

Patrol Bombing Squadron 44
- Active: 3 June 1941 – 20 June 1945
- Country: United States of America
- Branch: United States Navy
- Type: squadron
- Role: Maritime patrol
- Engagements: World War II

Aircraft flown
- Patrol: PBY-5/5A

VPB-44 was a Patrol Bombing Squadron of the U.S. Navy. The squadron was established as Patrol Squadron 44 (VP-44) on 3 June 1941, redesignated Patrol Bombing Squadron 44 (VPB-44) on 1 October 1944 and disestablished on 20 June 1945.

== Operational history ==
- 3 June 1941: VP-44 was established at NAS San Diego, California, under the operational control of PatWing-1, as a seaplane squadron flying the PBY-5A Catalina. Ground and flight training was conducted at San Diego.
- December 1941 – March 1942: VP-44 received advanced operational training at NAS Alameda, California, from 14 December 1941 until the squadron began preparations for its trans-Pacific flight to Hawaii at the end of March 1942. While at Alameda, the squadron came under the operational control of PatWing-6.
- 26 March 1942: VP-44 flew its trans-Pacific to NAS Pearl Harbor, Hawaii, coming under the operational control of PatWing-2. Operational and combat training was conducted in conjunction with patrols over the waters off Oahu.
- 22 May – June 1942: VP-44 transferred to Midway Island to provide combat patrols, joining Catalinas from VPs 14, 23, 24, 51, 72 and 91. There were 32 PBY-5 and 5A aircraft at Midway awaiting the arrival of the Japanese due to decoded intercepts detailing their plans to attack Midway Island. The aircraft were split into two groups—one operating with 22 aircraft from Sand Island, the other with 10 aircraft operating from Eastern Island. Sector searches were flown out to 700 miles (1,100 km) from Midway commencing at 04:15 each morning. The squadrons were handicapped at this stage of the war by the lack of radar on the aircraft. On 3 June, Ensign Jewell H. Reid and his crew were the first to spot the Japanese task force approaching Midway. On the night of 3–4 June, four squadron aircraft conducted an attack with obsolete Mark 13 torpedoes on a portion of the Japanese task force, causing damage to the Japanese tanker Akebono Maru. On 6 June, Lieutenant (jg) R. S. Whitman and his crew were attacked by three Japanese floatplanes and forced down. Whitman and ACRM C. Adams were killed in the attack. The aircraft was successfully ditched by the copilot, Ensign L. H. Camp, who then died of his wounds. AMM1c Virgil R. Marsh remained in the burning Catalina while his crew exited the sinking aircraft, holding off the attacking Japanese aircraft. The survivors were picked up later that day. The squadron returned to Pearl Harbor on 9 June. The other squadrons remained at Midway through the 25th conducting SAR missions for dive-bomber aircrews shot down during the Battle for Midway.
- 9 June – September 1942: VP-44 continued its patrols from NAS Pearl Harbor over the waters of Oahu, with a detachment at Johnston Atoll. On 26 September, the Pearl Harbor section of the squadron, including the headquarters staff, relocated to the recently completed NAS Kaneohe Bay facility. Two VP-44 aircraft were transferred to other squadrons reducing the complement to 10 aircraft.
- 21 December 1942: VP-44 turned in its 10 PBY-5A aircraft in return for 12 PBY-5 Catalinas. These aircraft were then equipped with twin 30-caliber guns and Mark IX gunsights.
- 22 December 1942 – May 1943: The squadron received orders to deploy to the combat zone at Espiritu Santo, New Hebrides, under the operational control of FAW-1. A detachment of two aircraft was sent to Halavo Seaplane Base, Florida Islands, for Dumbo (air-sea rescue) searches only. Many of the missions flown from Halavo went deep into enemy territory. For those flights fighter escorts often accompanied the Catalinas. While based at Espiritu Santo during the months of February and March 1943 the squadron carried numerous Dumbo missions and transported equipment and personnel during the Solomon Islands campaign. In May 1943, the squadron received two aircraft from VP-72, increasing the complement of Catalinas to 14 PBY-5s. Attacks on the Catalinas during this period were frequent. No less than 12 attacks by Kawanishi H6K Mavis flying boats and Mitsubishi G3M Nell bombers were recorded on squadron aircraft, but with no losses.
- 26 June 1943: VP-44 was relieved for return to NAS Kaneohe Bay and then on to the U.S. By 20 July 1943 VP-44 had arrived at NAS San Diego, coming under the operational control of FAW-14. All hands were given orders and home leave.
- 29 September 1943 – February 1944: VP-44 was reformed at NAS San Diego and conducted training in preparation for its second tour in the combat zone. Unlike the other Black Cat squadrons in the South Pacific, VP-44 was designated as such from the start. Its aircraft came from the factory with a flat-black finish instead of Navy blue, as was the normal practice. Training was completed in January 1944 and the squadron conducted its trans-Pacific flight to NAS Kaneohe Bay. It was discovered that the new amphibious PBY-5A with wheels did not have the range of its predecessor the PBY-5, and could not fly all the way to Hawaii with its wheels attached. The squadron found some PV-1 drop tanks at San Diego that they were able to fit to the wings of the Catalinas that gave them the range needed to make it to Hawaii. This then became standard procedure for the squadrons that followed. From 18 January to 13 February, the squadron departed NAS San Diego in pairs bound for NAS Kaneohe Bay.
- 1 February 1944: The squadron remained at NAS Kaneohe Bay, under the operational control of FAW-2, for five weeks of intensive training with emphasis on Anti-submarine warfare (ASW) techniques.
- 11 March 1944: VP-44 was deployed to Luganville Airfield on Espiritu Santo, under the operational control of FAW-1. A detachment of aircraft was maintained for convoy coverage at Nausori. ASW training resumed at Luganville Airfield, with the addition of two new technical aids: the Sonobuoy and a searchlight with 80 million candlepower. Anti-shipping searches, ASW patrols and rescue missions were the primary missions at both locations.
- 15 June 1944: VP-44 moved to Green Island, only 150 miles (240 km) from the enemy stronghold of Rabaul. A PATSU was available for maintenance of squadron aircraft and the berthing and feeding of unit personnel. Patrol missions involved flying daily search sectors extending in a northerly direction to within 200 miles (320 km) of Truk. ASW operations were discontinued. Patrol missions ceased after 18 August when the primary mission of the squadron was changed to keeping 17 nearby enemy airfields neutralized and to prevent shipping at night from getting to the bypassed Japanese garrisons. Nightly Black Cat raids were conducted and the squadron maintained standby aircraft for ASW and Dumbo missions during the day. Nightly hunts were usually coordinated with one of the PT boat squadrons stationed on Green Island. The Cats would spot the target at night with their radar, then illuminate the scene for the PT boats. Both would then join in on the kill. Attacks were usually made with 4 500-pound ANM-64 bombs and 40 20-pound fragmentation bombs. On one nighttime mission over Rabaul, an enemy floatplane fighter attacked Lieutenant Lloyd Garrison and his crew. In the ensuing combat they managed to shoot down the fighter. Upon return, the jubilant crew was informed that confirmation was needed before credit could be authorized. Undaunted, the crew returned early the next morning and took pictures in broad daylight of the smoking wreckage still floating in the bay at Rabaul. They were duly given credit for the deed.
- 4 September – December 1944: VP-44 operational control was changed from FAW-1 to FAW-2. By this stage of the war, Japanese resistance had been broken and Rabaul neutralized. It was the squadron's job to see that 17 enemy airfields were regularly bombed to prevent their use and to intercept resupply ships and barges attempting to reinforce Japanese troops on Bougainville and New Ireland. A detachment of three aircraft was maintained for a few months at Torokina Airfield on Bougainville for Dumbo work with Marine air units. This group was nearly overrun during a Banzai charge by the last remaining Japanese troops on Bougainville in December 1944.
- 1 December 1944: VPB-44 operational control was shifted from FAW-2 to Commander Air Seventh Fleet (ComAir7thFlt). Six squadron aircraft were utilized for passenger and mail runs between Hollandia, New Guinea and Leyte, Philippines. The squadron also conducted resupply for the Australian Coastwatchers, flying to such remote islands as Pinipel, Feni, Nuguria, Lehir and Ontong Java.
- January – February 1945: The squadron remained based primarily on Green Island, with one aircraft at Hollandia and two at the Seaplane Base Repair Base #1 on Manus Island. Black Cat missions were officially terminated on 10 February with the complete neutralization of Rabaul and the primary mission of the squadron shifted to Dumbo work.
- March 1945: A three-aircraft detachment was located at Manus and a two-aircraft detachment at Emirau Island for Dumbo work. The squadron at Green Island was primarily assigned air freight, ASW standby and Dumbo missions.
- 11 April 1945: VPB-44 was relieved by VPB-53 for return to the United States. The squadron arrived at NAS Kaneohe Bay on 21 April and boarded USS Cape Esperance for return to San Diego, Calif. Upon arrival on 1 May, the squadron was given orders reassigning all personnel.
- 20 June 1945: VPB-44 was disestablished at NAS San Diego.

== Aircraft assignments ==
The squadron was assigned the following aircraft, effective on the dates shown:

- PBY-5A - June 1941
- PBY-5 - December 1942
- PBY-5A - September 1943

== Home port assignments ==
The squadron was assigned to these home ports, effective on the dates shown:

- NAS San Diego, California - 3 June 1941
- NAS Alameda, California - 14 December 1941
- NAS Pearl Harbor, Hawaii - 26 March 1942
- NAS Kaneohe Bay, Hawaii - 26 September 1942
- NAS San Diego - July 1943
- NAS Kaneohe Bay - 18 January 1944
- NAS San Diego - 1 May 1945

== See also ==
- Maritime patrol aircraft
- List of inactive United States Navy aircraft squadrons
- List of United States Navy aircraft squadrons
- List of squadrons in the Dictionary of American Naval Aviation Squadrons
- History of the United States Navy
