= AV16 =

AV16 may refer to:

- USS St. George (AV-16), a U.S. Navy seaplane tender of the Kenneth Whiting class.
- McDonnell Douglas AV-16, a proposed development of the AV-8A Harrier
