= VPB-18 =

Patrol Bombing Squadron 18
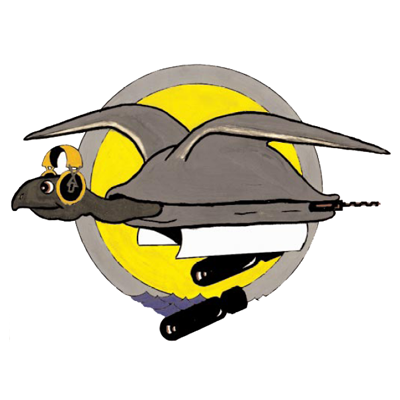
- VPB-18 patch
- Active: 15 January 1944 - 23 November 1945
- Country: United States of America
- Branch: United States Navy
- Type: squadron
- Role: Maritime patrol
- Engagements: World War II

Aircraft flown
- Patrol: PBM-3D Mariner

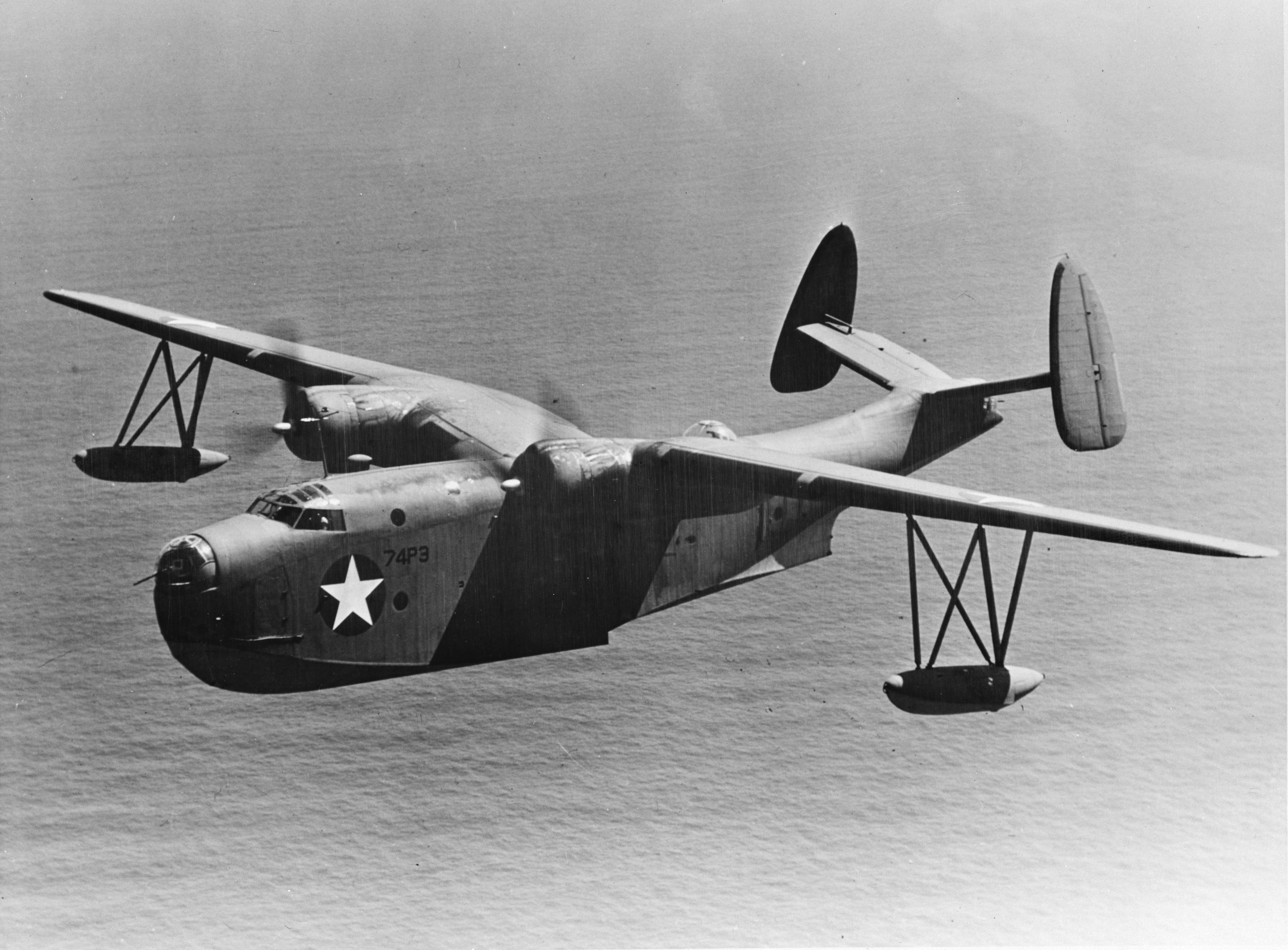
PBM-3 Mariner

VPB-18 was a Patrol Bombing Squadron of the U.S. Navy, flying the PBM-3D Mariner. The squadron was established as Patrol Squadron 18 (VP-18) on 15 January 1944 and redesignated as VPB-18 on 1 October 1944. It was disestablished on 23 November 1945. The squadron had a distinguished combat history in the Pacific War.

== Operational history ==
- 15 January–April 1944: VP-18 was established at NAS Norfolk, Virginia, as a medium (twin engine) seaplane squadron flying the PBM Mariner. The squadron came under the operational control of FAW-5. The squadron was originally scheduled to go to NAAB Harvey Point, North Carolina, for training, but those facilities were overcrowded. On 1 February, VP-18 was relocated to NAS Charleston, South Carolina, for shakedown flight training in the Mariner. On 9 April, the squadron was relocated, this time to NAS Key West, Florida, for training in Anti-submarine warfare (ASW) techniques.
- 12 May 1944: With the completion of the syllabus at NAS Key West, the squadron received orders to proceed to NAS Alameda, California, under FAW-8, to prepare for the trans-Pacific flight to Hawaii. To prepare for the cross-country flight, the aircraft were stripped of all armament, armor plate and other unnecessary gear. These items were packed for transhipment to NAS Kaneohe Bay, Hawaii. The squadron aircraft flew in groups of three to Eagle Lake, Texas, then on to Alameda. VP-18 was ready to begin the long trans-Pacific flight on 30 May 1944, with the last aircraft arriving safely at NAS Kaneohe Bay by 6 June 1944.
- 7 June 1944: VP-18 came under the operational control of FAW-2 while at NAS Kaneohe Bay. Training for combat patrols continued through 13 July 1944, when preparations were made to begin island hopping to the South Pacific. The armor plate, machine guns and other gear needed for operations in the combat zone that had been removed at Charleston were reinstalled.
- 15 July–September 1944: VP-18 departed Kaneohe for Ebeye Island, Kwajalein Atoll, arriving on 17 July. Several high-altitude-bombing missions were run against Wotje, and the remainder of the time was spent on mail runs and Dumbo missions. On 1 August orders were received to proceed to Saipan. The squadron was based afloat in Tanapag Harbor, with two detachments aboard USS Yakutat and USS Shelikof under the operational control of FAW-18. On 9 September 1944, the detachment aboard Yakutat relocated to USS Coos Bay. The squadron's experience indicated that these Humboldt-class tenders were too small to support modern seaplane squadron operations, with inadequate berthing, lack of spare parts and poor maintenance facilities. Both day and night patrols were conducted in the vicinity of Saipan to provide antisubmarine screening in addition to mail hops between Saipan and Ulithi, hunter-killer standby and Dumbo standby.
- 23 September 1944: VP-18 flew all of its aircraft back to Ebeye for engine changes that the small PATSU unit at Saipan was unable to handle. The squadron returned to Saipan in October, and assumed the duties of transferring mail and passengers between Saipan, Ulithi and Kossol Passage. Maintenance during this period proved troublesome. There were continual problems with the Wright Cyclone R-2600-22 engines due to limited maintenance facilities. When aircraft were damaged on reefs, salvage resources were inadequate in recovering aircraft, resulting in unnecessary losses. The situation improved when CASU-48 became the squadron's maintenance organization in mid-October.
- 1 November 1944: The patrol emphasis was shifted to daytime, with three 600-mile sectors, and one night antishipping patrol. On 9 November 1944, the squadron moved aboard the newly completed NAB Tanapag, Saipan.
- 20 November 1944: Two aircraft and two aircrews departed for NAS Kaneohe Bay as part of the new crew rotation plan. The squadron had originally been scheduled for relief in January 1945, but the war in Europe had forced the Navy to reconsider its squadron allocations. Two crews would be relieved each month by new crews from the States. Ground crews were not included in the rotations, and most wound up serving through the end of the war without being relieved.
- 30 November 1944: Following the arrival of the tender USS St. George, VPB-18 moved aboard and experienced a distinct improvement in living quality for all hands. Maintenance was taken over by the PATSU unit aboard.
- 13 December 1944 – 4 February 1945: VPB-18 was relieved of duty at Saipan by VPB-13. On 19 December 1944, the squadron relocated to Kossol Passage to relieve VPB-21 in the conducting of searches and antishipping patrols under the operational control of FAW-1. The squadron was provided tender support by USS Chandeleur and USS Casco and on 24 December the squadron moved back aboard USS St. George. VPB-18 continued routine 600-mile searches northwest of Kossol Passage through 4 February 1945, when orders were received to relocate again.
- 5 February 1945: VPB-18 relocated to Ulithi, with St. George following. Routine patrols and searches were conducted at this location until the end of February, when orders were again received to relocate the squadron.
- 1 March 1945: VPB-18 relocated back to Saipan, with St. George following. Routine patrols and training flights were conducted through the end of March under the operational control of FAW-18.
- 28 March 1945: VPB-18 and the St. George were relocated to the island of Kerama Retto, southeast of Naha, Okinawa. From this location, day and night antishipping search patrols were conducted north along Nansei Shoto to Kyushu under the operational control of FAW-1. On 1 April 1945, a detachment of two aircraft was sent to NAB Tanapag Harbor, Saipan, returning on the 30th.
- 6 April 1945: Two VPB-18 crews downed enemy fighters during the same patrol. Lieutenant Jorden B. Collins claimed a Nakajima B5N over the East China Sea south of Kyushu. One hour later, Lieutenant Gerald Hooker and his crew spotted an Aichi D3A over the East China Sea northeast of the Ryukyu Islands and shot it down.
- 16 April 1945: Two more VPB-18 crews scored on the same day, with Lieutenant Jorden B. Collins and Lieutenant Paul D. Fitzgerald sharing credit for an Aichi E13A shot down over the Korean Strait.
- 4 May 1945: Lieutenant Paul D. Fitzgerald and his crew claimed a Nakajima Ki-27 while on patrol over the East China Sea east of Naha, Okinawa. Lieutenant (jg) John D. Martin and his crew shot down a Kate in the same general area just eight minutes later.
- 6 May 1945: A Kamikaze struck the crane on the seaplane deck of St. George while at anchor in Kerama Retto. The engine of the aircraft penetrated below decks into the VPB-18 area stateroom of Lieutenant Jorden Collins, killing him instantly and injuring his roommate, Lieutenant Peter Prudden.
- 15 May 1945: Three squadron aircraft, piloted by Lieutenant Marvin E. Hart, Lieutenant (jg) Irving E. Marr and Lieutenant Dixon, were attacked by several Kawanishi N1Ks from the 343rd Ku over the Tsushima Straits at 11:45 hours (local time). In the ensuing combat Hart's crew accounted for three N1Ks. Marr's crew also claimed one N1K. Having lost an engine during one of the attacks, Marr headed back toward base. The remaining enemy fighters concentrated their fire on Lieutenant Marr's crippled aircraft. In the crash that followed all of the crew were killed. Hart was forced to ditch later on, but all except three of the crew were subsequently rescued.
- 28 May 1945: Lieutenant John T. Moore and his crew claimed a Ki-27 fighter when attacked by enemy fighters while on patrol over the East China Sea north of the Ryukus.
- 28 June 1945: Lieutenant (jg) Podlogar and four of his crew were killed when their aircraft lost an engine during a night patrol. The aircraft impacted the water before single engine procedures could be put into effect.
- 12 July 1945: VPB-18 was withdrawn to NAB Tanapag Harbor, Saipan, for ten days of crew rest and aircraft maintenance. During its operational tour at Kerama Retto, the squadron had shot down 10 enemy aircraft (confirmed by postwar examination of enemy records), and had sunk 44 ships during 422 combat missions. Six aircraft had been lost during this period, three from combat and three from accidents. Daily surveillance patrols were conducted on reduced tempo under operational control of FAW-18. On 17–19 August 1945, training was conducted on use of the sonobuoy with USS Gar. Equipment that had been installed the week before was removed a few weeks later when it became apparent that it would no longer be needed with the hostilities unexpectedly coming to an end.
- 24 August 1945: VPB-18 was relieved of patrol responsibilities to commence shuttle service for mail, passengers and supplies to Tokyo. The aircraft were stripped of armor, guns and bomb racks in preparation for the first of 51 roundtrip flights to Japan that began on 1 September 1945 and continued through 3 October 1945.
- 24 October 1945: The squadron was transferred to Tinian for one week of crew rest.
- 3 November 1945: VPB-18 flew to Okinawa to begin weather flight service until orders were received to stand down for return to the States. Detachment orders were received on 14 November 1945, for return to NAS San Diego, via Kaneohe.
- 11 December 1945: VPB-18 was disestablished at NAS San Diego.

== Home port assignments ==
The squadron was assigned to these home ports, effective on the dates shown:

- NAS Norfolk – January 1944
- NAS Charleston – 1 February 1944
- NAS Key West – 9 April 1944
- NAS Kaneohe Bay – 7 June 1944
- NAS San Diego – November 1945

== See also ==
- Maritime patrol aircraft
- List of inactive United States Navy aircraft squadrons
- List of United States Navy aircraft squadrons
- List of squadrons in the Dictionary of American Naval Aviation Squadrons
- History of the United States Navy
