= VPB-91 =

Patrol Bombing Squadron 91
- Active: 1 December 1941 – 2 April 1946
- Country: United States of America
- Branch: United States Navy
- Type: squadron
- Role: Maritime patrol
- Engagements: World War II

Aircraft flown
- Patrol: PBY-5/5A Catalina; PBM-3S Mariner

VPB-91 was a Patrol Bombing Squadron of the U.S. Navy. The squadron was established as Patrol Squadron 91 (VP-91) on 1 December 1941, redesignated as Patrol Bombing Squadron 91 (VPB-91) on 1 October 1944 and disestablished on 2 April 1946.

== Operational history ==
- 1 December 1941: VP-91 was established at NAS Norfolk, Virginia, under the operational control of PatWing-8, as a seaplane squadron flying the PBY-5 Catalina. On 15 December 1941, the squadron was relocated to NAS Alameda, California. Upon arrival preparations were made for the trans-Pacific flight to Pearl Harbor, Hawaii, where VP-91 would be located to reinforce the patrol squadrons depleted by the Japanese attack.
- 28 February 1942: VP-91 departed San Francisco, California, for Pearl Harbor, with the last aircraft arriving safely by 2 March 1942. Upon arrival the squadron came under the operational control of PatWing-1. VP-91 remained in the Hawaii area through early September flying local patrols under COMNAVAIRBASEDEFENSE.
- 4 September 1942: VP-91 began relocating south into the active war zone, arriving at Espiritu Santo, New Hebrides Islands, on 13 September 1942. Operations from this area were conducted while based aboard USS Mackinac at the Luganville Seaplane Base, under the operational control of FAW-1. On 2 November 1942, with the departure of Mackinac, the officers of the squadron were berthed aboard USS Curtiss, while the enlisted personnel were berthed aboard USS Tangier.
- 27 October 1942: Lieutenant Melvin K. Atwell and crew were flying a night reconnaissance mission in the vicinity of the Solomon Islands when they spotted a large vessel 30 miles (48 km) away. They determined that the dark outline of a large ship was moving in an easterly direction at high speed. Flying closer to investigate, the ship was seen to enter a low overcast and stop. Two passes at low altitude failed to identify the ship. Atwell climbed back to 1,500 feet (460 m) and when 2 miles (3.2 km) from the ship was bracketed by two bursts of anti-aircraft fire. He immediately put the aircraft into a dive, releasing his four 500-pound (230 kg) bombs over the ship at approximately 600 feet (180 m). Two bombs were seen to explode aft of the forward smokestack of the ship, which appeared to be an Aoba-class cruiser. The concussion of the explosions damaged the aircraft, which barely pulled out of the dive at 20 feet (6.1 m) above the surface of the sea. Atwell chose not to linger in the vicinity of the warship, as he had developed several fuel leaks. As they headed for home base a large orange flash was seen in the distance in the vicinity of the target, followed by a larger explosion 10 minutes later. For his courageous single-handed attack on the enemy warship Lieutenant Atwell was awarded the Navy Cross.
- 13 November 1942: Five of the squadron aircraft were flown to Vanikoro, supported by tender Mackinac in Peon Bay. On 2 December 1942, Mackinac was relieved by USS Ballard, and returned to Espiritu Santo. The detachment of five aircraft and six crews remained with Ballard, flying sector searches from Vanikoro, while the seven aircraft remaining at Espiritu Santo aboard Mackinac flew sectors from that location.
- March 1943: VP-91 was relieved for return to the continental U.S. The squadron was reformed at NAS San Diego, California, under the operational control of FAW-14.
- 9 August 1943: VP-91 conducted its trans-Pacific flight to Hawaii, with the last aircraft arriving safely at NAS Kaneohe Bay on 18 August 1943. Here the squadron remained until 1 October 1943, when a detachment of six aircraft was sent to Johnston Island for anti-shipping patrols in support of the Task Force 14 raid on Wake Island from 5 to 6 October.
- 29 October 1943: VP-91 began the deployment from NAS Kaneohe Bay, Hawaii, in three-aircraft elements to Espiritu Santo. Upon arrival on 10 November 1943, the squadron came under the operational control of FAW- 1, supported by tenders USS Wright and USS Chandeleur. Three days later, a detachment of six aircraft was sent to Suva, Fiji. A second detachment of three aircraft was sent to Halavo Seaplane Base, leaving three aircraft and six crews to conduct sector patrols from Espiritu Santo. Crews and aircraft were rotated frequently between all three sites.
- 1 January 1944: The Halavo Bay detachment was relieved, and the aircraft and crews redistributed with six PBYs at Suva, aboard Mackinac, and seven PBYs at Espiritu Santo, aboard Chandeleur. Duties consisted primarily of convoy escort and aircraft maintenance.
- 26 March 1944: VP-91 was relieved by VP-54, and dispatched to Tulagi Island, Halavo Bay Seaplane Base. Shortly after arrival, five aircraft were detached to Treasury Island, three aircraft were sent to Green Island, and two were sent to Emirau Island. Duties of the squadron at this time consisted primarily of air-sea rescue missions and miscellaneous utility work for Commander Air Northern Solomons. On 27 May 1944, the Treasury Island detachment of five aircraft was sent to Green Island to augment the three aircraft present, reverting to search sector and antishipping patrols. The augmented detachment was supported by tenders USS Coos Bay and USS Chincoteague.
- 15 June 1944: VP-91 was relieved at Green Island by VP-44. The eight aircraft of the detachment were flown to Halavo Bay Seaplane Base, where the squadron was reunited to prepare for transfer back to the continental U.S. VP-91 departed the combat zone on 21 July 1944 in elements of three aircraft, bound for NAS San Diego, California via NAS Kaneohe Bay.
- 10 September 1944: VP-91 was reformed at NAS San Diego, Calif., under the operational control of FAW-14. While training of new personnel was underway, the squadron was redesignated VPB-91.
- 15 Oct 1944: VPB-91 was relocated to NAS Corpus Christi, Texas, to learn how to process Naval Aviators and combat air crews through an advanced training course for combat replacement crews flying the PBM Mariner. On completion of the course on 13 December 1944, the squadron was transferred to NAS Whidbey Island, Washington, under the operational control of FAW-6. Here the squadron remained until the end of the war, training replacement crews.
- 2 April 1946: VPB-91 was disestablished at NAS Whidbey Island.

== Aircraft assignments ==
The squadron was assigned the following aircraft, effective on the dates shown:

- PBY-5 - December 1942
- PBY-5A - December 1942
- PBM-3S Mariner

== Home port assignments ==
The squadron was assigned to these home ports, effective on the dates shown:

- NAS Norfolk, Virginia - 1 December 1941
- NAS Alameda - 15 December 1941
- NAS Ford Island, Hawaii - 2 March 1942
- NAS San Diego, California - March 1943
- NAS Kaneohe Bay, Hawaii - 18 August 1943
- NAS San Diego, California - July 1944
- NAS Corpus Christi, Texas - 15 October 1944
- NAS Whidbey Island, Washington - 13 December 1944

== See also ==
- Maritime patrol aircraft
- List of inactive United States Navy aircraft squadrons
- List of United States Navy aircraft squadrons
- List of squadrons in the Dictionary of American Naval Aviation Squadrons
- History of the United States Navy
