= VPB-216 =

Patrol Bombing Squadron 216
- Active: 15 November 1943 – 7 April 1945
- Country: United States of America
- Branch: United States Navy
- Role: Maritime patrol
- Size: Squadron
- Engagements: World War II

Aircraft flown
- Patrol: PBM-3S/D

VPB-216 was a Patrol Bombing Squadron of the U.S. Navy. The squadron was established as Patrol Squadron Two Hundred Sixteen (VP-216) on 15 November 1943, redesignated Patrol Bombing Squadron Two Hundred Sixteen (VPB-216) on 1 October 1944 and disestablished on 7 April 1945.

== Operational history ==
- 15 November 1943 – 26 February 1944: VP-216 was established at NAAS Harvey Point, North Carolina, as medium seaplane squadron flying the PBM-3S Mariner, under the operational control of FAW-5. From 5 December 1943 to 24 January 1944 intensive ground and flight training was conducted. Upon completion of the syllabus, the squadron was equipped with new PBM-3D Mariner. Almost immediately, problems began to appear with the valve inserts in the Wright R2600-22 engines of the Mariners, resulting in grounding of all squadron aircraft through 26 February 1944. These problems were not completely resolved until late May.
- 2–23 March 1944: Twelve squadron aircraft were transferred to NAS Key West, Florida, for intensive shakedown training in Anti-submarine warfare (ASW), glide bombing and use of radar in bombing.
- 24 March 1944: VP-216 transferred aircraft and personnel in three-aircraft elements to NAS Alameda, California, via MCAS Eagle Mountain Lake, Texas, and NAS San Diego, California. "How goes it" curves were developed on each aircraft, enabling the crew to determine each individual aircraft's capabilities for the forthcoming trans-Pacific flight to Hawaii. The curve was a plot of speed, distance, engine settings, remaining fuel, etc., that assisted the crew in assessing the crucial "point of no return" for the over-water transit to NAS Kaneohe Bay, Hawaii.
- 29 March – 1 April 1944: Ten of the squadron's 15 aircraft were able to complete the 2,200 miles (3,500 km) trans-Pacific flight from NAS Alameda to NAS Kaneohe Bay, coming under the operational control of FAW-2. Three required engine replacements at the MCAS Eagle Mountain Lake, refueling point and two needed major repairs upon arrival at NAS Alameda. These five aircraft rejoined the squadron at NAS Kaneohe Bay on 30 April.
- 1 April – 23 June 1944: The next three months were spent at NAS Kaneohe Bay undergoing intensive combat training and repairs to the erratic engines. During this period the squadron conducted 700 miles (1,100 km) sector patrols, made final equipment check runs and conducted bomb-dropping and gunnery exercises on a daily basis. Deficiencies in crew member training were eliminated by proficiency checks and refresher courses.
- 28 May 1944: 12 officers and 42 men departed aboard USS Chandeleur for Saipan, Marianas Island.
- 23 June 1944: VP-216 deployed to Saipan, anchoring in Tanapag Harbor, under the operational control of FAW-2. USS Chandeleur provided berthing and maintenance support for the squadron during this period. Primary duties involved day and night reconnaissance patrols for Fifth Fleet operations. During the period through 10 August the squadron attacked and damaged three Japanese cargo vessels. Although numerous enemy aircraft were spotted, none could be attacked successfully due to the slower speed of the Mariner.
- 31 July 1944: A VP-216 Mariner flown by Lieutenant Richard P. Gavin developed engine problems and landed at sea, damaging a wingtip float in the process. No injuries to the crew were incurred and 24 hours later ships of TF-51 rescued the crew. The aircraft, which could not be salvaged or towed due to the damage, provided useful target practice to the destroyers on the scene.
- 10 July – 10 September 1944: By this date, enemy snipers and scavengers had been largely eliminated ashore on Saipan. VP-216 began using the Japanese-constructed seaplane ramp at Tanapag Harbor to permit on-shore maintenance and crew rest on dry land. Armed guards were posted and assisted in the capture or killing of over 20 Japanese soldiers in their perimeter. Throughout August the tempo of operations decreased, and the squadron was put on standby for redeployment to the Palau Islands group.
- 10 September 1944: The first three-aircraft element of VP-216 was transferred to Kossol Passage, Palau, under the operational command of FAW-1. At 04:00 the next day, the squadron received a sharp lesson on watch tending when a group of Japanese boarded an adjacent PB2Y-3 Coronado in the anchorage, blowing up the aircraft and killing themselves in the process. The remainder of the squadron arrived at Kossol Passage by 17 September. USS Chandeleur and USS Pocomoke provided seaplane tender services at Kossol Passage. Operations at Kossol Passage were the same as at Saipan, providing coverage for the Third Fleet under Admiral Halsey.
- 6 October 1944: Lieutenant Arthur W. Doherty encountered typhoon weather while returning from a night patrol. With his radio direction-finder gear and radar inoperative, Lieutenant Doherty managed to establish his position and began a correct heading towards base. On the morning of 7 October, approximately 80 miles (130 km) from base, the Mariner ran out of gas, forcing Lieutenant Doherty to attempt a stall landing. In the process a wing was torn off and 9 crewmembers escaped the wreckage. One officer and two enlisted men were lost in the accident.
- 18 November 1944: The first three-aircraft element of VPB-216 left Kossol Passage for return to NAS Kaneohe Bay, en route to NAS San Diego.
- 7 April 1945: VPB-216 was disestablished.

== Aircraft assignments ==
The squadron was assigned the following aircraft, effective on the dates shown:

- PBM-3S November 1943
- PBM-3D January 1944

== Home port assignments ==
The squadron was assigned to these home ports, effective on the dates shown:

- NAAS Harvey Point, North Carolina 15 November 1943
- NAS Key West, Florida 2 March 1944
- NAS Alameda, California 25 March 1944
- NAS Kaneohe Bay, Hawaii 1 April 1944
- NAS San Diego, California 21 November 1944

== See also ==
- Maritime patrol aircraft
- List of inactive United States Navy aircraft squadrons
- List of United States Navy aircraft squadrons
- List of squadrons in the Dictionary of American Naval Aviation Squadrons
- History of the United States Navy
