= VPB-16 =

Patrol Bombing Squadron 16
- Active: 20 December 1943 – 30 June 1945
- Country: United States of America
- Branch: United States Navy
- Type: squadron
- Role: Maritime patrol
- Engagements: World War II

Aircraft flown
- Patrol: PBM-3D

VPB-16 was a Patrol Bombing Squadron of the U.S. Navy. The squadron was established as Patrol Squadron 16 (VP-16) on 20 December 1943, redesignated Patrol Bombing Squadron 16 (VPB-16) on 1 October 1944 and disestablished on 30 June 1945.

== Operational history ==
- 3 January 1944: VP-16 was established at NAS Norfolk, Virginia, under the operational control of FAW-5, as a seaplane patrol squadron flying the PBM-3D Mariner.
- 12 March 1944: After a brief period of shakedown training, the squadron was relocated to NAS Key West, Florida, for further training in Anti-submarine warfare (ASW). On 6 April 1944, orders were received to transfer the squadron assets and personnel to NAS Alameda, California, for deployment to the South Pacific.
- 11 April 1944: VP-16 began the trans-Pacific flight from NAS Alameda to NAS Kaneohe Bay, Hawaii. By 8 May 1944, the squadron was ready for the continuation of combat training, commencing with patrols and ASW training in the vicinity of the Hawaiian Islands under the operational command of FAW-2. Lieutenant W. R. Briggs and his crew ditched en route and spent 44 hours in life rafts before being rescued without injuries.
- 7 June 1944: VP-16 departed for Eniwetok, having been operational at the beginning of the month. By 17 June 1944, the squadron was conducting searches and patrols during the Marianas Campaign. Tender support at Eniwetok was provided by USS Pocomoke.
- 17 June 1944: When word of the approach of the Japanese fleet reached Admiral Raymond A. Spruance, commander of the forces engaged in the capture of Saipan, he called for patrol aircraft from the Marshalls to assist other forces in guarding against a surprise attack. Five PBMs of VP-16 arrived off Saipan on 17 June 1944 and based aboard USS Ballard, which was operating in the open sea within range of enemy guns ashore. One of the aircraft became inoperative, reducing the number available for patrol to four. These aircraft conducted a search to the west, and at 01:15 on 19 June one of them located the enemy force of about 40 ships 470 miles (760 km) west of Guam. Unable to contact the base because of radio problems, the pilot was forced to fly back to deliver the message. The information did not reach Admiral Spruance until seven hours after the contact. Because the exact location of the enemy was not known, he launched the aircraft of Task Force 58 late, but just in time to catch the enemy aircraft as they approached. The resulting battle became known as the "Marianas Turkey Shoot," and was the opening day of the Battle of the Philippine Sea.
- 19 and 22 June 1944: Casualties from friendly fire occurred on two occasions. On the 19th one crewman was killed after a squadron PBM returning from patrol was fired on by F6F Hellcats. On the 22nd, Lieutenant Harry R. Flachsbarth and his crew were shot down at night by a destroyer of TG 58. There were no survivors.
- 1 August 1944: The remaining squadron aircraft arrived at NAB Saipan. At that time, VP-16 was the only night flying PBM squadron in the Pacific. USS Pocomoke became overcrowded, and the overflow crews moved aboard USS Onslow. The squadron flew 249 missions during the remainder of the Saipan campaign. It was relieved on 19 August 1944 by VP-18.
- 21 August 1944: VP-16 had been operating from several remote bases with tender support for two months. It regrouped at Ebeye Island for maintenance and repair before further deployment. The squadron was transferred to FAW-1 for operations in the western Caroline Islands.
- 17 September 1944: VP-16 was transferred to Kossol Passage, Palau, with tender support by USS Pocomoke. During this period the squadron conducted night operations and Dumbo (air-sea rescue) work during the Palau Campaign.
- 28 September 1944: Lieutenant Daniel U. Thomas crashed at sea while on night patrol. One crewman survived and was rescued the next day.
- 1 October 1944: VP-16 was redesignated VPB-16. The squadron continued to conduct anti-shipping patrols at night and Dumbo missions in the area around the Palau island group through the middle of November 1944. On the night of 1–2 October 1944, a squadron PBM-3D flown by Lieutenant Floyd H. Wardlow Jr. dropped a Mark 24 mine on a suspected submarine target 50 miles (80 km) northwest of Palau. No further Sonobuoy contact was obtained after the attack and Lieutenant Wardlow and crew returned to their patrol sector. The next day a hunter-killer group located a badly damaged submarine 12 miles (19 km) from Lieutenant Wardlow's attack, indicating that his efforts were successful in at least damaging the enemy. USS Samuel B. Miles sank the submarine, later identified by postwar records as I-177. There were 101 men aboard when she was sunk, including the commanding officer of Submarine Division 34, Captain Kanji Matsumura.
- 23 November 1944: VPB-16 was relieved at Kossol Passage for return to NAS Kaneohe Bay and the continental United States. After a brief period of maintenance and refit, the squadron commenced the trans-Pacific flight back to NAS Alameda on 9 December, with the last squadron aircraft arriving on 13 December 1944.
- 30 June 1945: VPB-16 was disestablished at NAS Alameda.

== Aircraft assignments ==
The squadron was assigned the following aircraft, effective on the dates shown:

- PBM-3D - March 1944

== Home port assignments ==
The squadron was assigned to these home ports, effective on the dates shown:

- NAS Norfolk, Virginia - 3 January 1944
- NAS Key West, Florida - 12 March 1944
- NAS Kaneohe Bay, Hawaii - 11 April 1944
- NAS Alameda, California - 9 December 1944

== See also ==
- Maritime patrol aircraft
- List of inactive United States Navy aircraft squadrons
- List of United States Navy aircraft squadrons
- List of squadrons in the Dictionary of American Naval Aviation Squadrons
- History of the United States Navy
