= USS Mackinac (AVP-13) =

Tender of the United States Navy

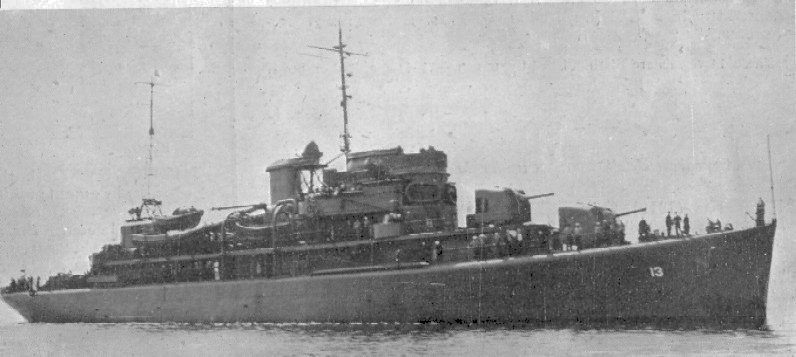
- USS Mackinac (AVP-13) ca. 1942

History

United States
- Name: USS Mackinac
- Namesake: Mackinac Island in northern Michigan
- Builder: Puget Sound Navy Yard, Bremerton, Washington
- Laid down: 29 May 1940
- Launched: 15 November 1941
- Sponsored by: Mrs. Ralph Wood
- Commissioned: 24 January 1942
- Decommissioned: January 1947
- Identification: AVP-13
- Nickname(s): "Mighty Mac"
- Honors and awards: Six battle stars for World War II service
- Fate: Loaned to United States Coast Guard 19 April 1949
- Acquired: Returned by U.S. Coast Guard 21 July 1968
- Stricken: 21 July 1968
- Fate: Sunk as target 23 July 1968

United States
- Name: USCGC Mackinac
- Namesake: Previous name retained
- Acquired: Loaned by U.S. Navy to U.S. Coast Guard 19 April 1949; Accepted by Coast Guard 21 April 1949
- Commissioned: 11 May 1949
- Identification: WAVP-371
- Reclassified: High endurance cutter, WHEC-371, 1 May 1966
- Decommissioned: 28 December 1967
- Honors and awards: Eastern Area Vessel Performance Award for Fiscal Year 1967
- Fate: Returned to U.S. Navy 21 July 1968
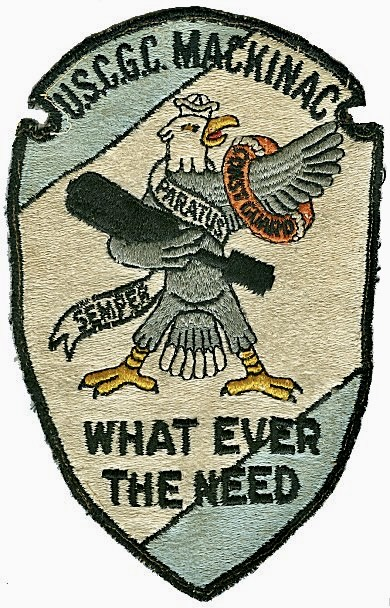
- Badge: Crest of USCGC Mackinac

General characteristics (seaplane tender)
- Class & type: Barnegat-class small seaplane tender
- Displacement: 2,592 tons (light)
- Length: 311 ft 8 in (95.00 m)
- Beam: 41 ft 1 in (12.52 m)
- Draft: 13 ft 6 in (4.11 m)
- Installed power: 6,000 bhp (4,500 kW)
- Propulsion: Diesel engines, two shafts
- Speed: 18.2 knots (33.7 km/h)
- Complement: 215 (ship's company); 367 (including aviation unit)
- Armament: Primary: 2 x 5 in (130 mm)/38 cal. guns; 8 × 40 mm antiaircraft guns; 6 × 20 mm antiaircraft guns; 2 × depth charge tracks
- Aviation facilities: Supplies, spare parts, repairs, and berthing for one seaplane squadron; 80,000 US gallons (300,000 L) aviation fuel

General characteristics (Coast Guard cutter)
- Class & type: Casco-class cutter
- Displacement: 2,515.2 long tons (2,555.6 t) (full load) in 1965
- Length: 311 ft 7 in (94.97 m) oa; 300 ft 0 in (91.44 m) pp
- Beam: 41 ft 0 in (12.50 m) maximum
- Draft: 12 ft 8 in (3.86 m) maximum in 1965
- Installed power: 6,000 bhp (4,500 kW) in 1965
- Propulsion: Fairbanks-Morse direct reversing diesel engines, two shafts; 166,525 US gallons (630,370 L) of fuel
- Speed: 18.0 knots (33.3 km/h) (maximum sustained in 1965); 12.0 knots (22.2 km/h) (economic) in 1965
- Range: 9,900 nautical miles (18,300 km) at 18.0 knots (33.3 km/h) in 1965; 19,980 nautical miles (37,000 km) at 12.0 knots (22.2 km/h) in 1965
- Complement: 149 (10 officers, 2 warrant officers, 137 enlisted personnel) in 1965
- Sensors & processing systems: Radars in 1965: SPS-23, SPS-29B; Sonar in 1965: SQS-1
- Armament: In 1965: 1 x 5 in (127 mm)/38 cal. Mark 12 Mod 1 gun, 1 x Mark 52 Mod 3 director, 1 x Mark 26 Mod 3 fire-control radar, 2 x .50-caliber (12.7 mm) machine guns; 4 × Mark 6 Mod 2 depth charge projectors; 1 × Mark 10 Mod 1 antisubmarine projector

The second USS Mackinac (AVP-13) was a United States Navy Barnegat-class small seaplane tender in commission from 1942 to 1947 that saw service during World War II. After the war, she was in commission in the United States Coast Guard from 1949 to 1967 as the cutter USCGC Mackinac (WAVP-371), later WHEC-371, the second ship of the Coast Guard or its predecessor, the United States Revenue Cutter Service, to bear the name.

== Construction and commissioning ==
Mackinac was laid down on 29 May 1940 at Puget Sound Navy Yard in Bremerton, Washington. She was launched on 15 November 1941, sponsored by Mrs. Ralph Wood, wife of the commanding officer of Naval Air Station Seattle in Seattle, Washington, and commissioned on 24 January 1942.

== United States Navy service ==
=== World War II ===
==== First Pacific tour, 1942-1943 ====
After three months of shakedown, Mackinac, escorting a large convoy, departed the United States West Coast for Pearl Harbor, Hawaii, on 11 May 1942, arriving there on 19 May 1942. On 22 May 1942, the famous explorer Rear Admiral (retired) Richard E. Byrd and his staff came on board for an inspection cruise of U.S. bases in the South Pacific. Byrd, because of his worldwide recognition, had been drawn out of retirement to represent the United States to the French colonies in the South Pacific, which were nominally under the control of the pro-German Vichy government, as their cooperation was vital to the war effort there. Byrd debarked at Auckland, New Zealand, on 23 June 1942, and Mackinac then headed to Naval Base Noumea at Nouméa, New Caledonia, on 18 July 1942.

With preparations underway for the Guadalcanal‑Tulagi landing, scheduled for 7 August 1942 through 9 August 1942, Mackinac was assigned the task of setting up a seaplane base at Malaita, the most advanced post of the Guadalcanal campaign, while her PBY Catalina flying boats searched northward and westward to watch the sealane between Truk and Guadalcanal in case of any Imperial Japanese Navy reaction from its base at Truk. No American was known to have visited Malaita since Jack London in 1908, whence he had fled in disgust from fierce storms and head hunters. Now Commander Hitchcock took Mackinac up the back of the island and threaded his way into Maramasike Estuary on the southeast coast, through waters for which there were no charts. Mackinac opened for business with nine PBY Catalinas on the morning of 8 August 1942. One of the first American ships to anchor in the Solomon Islands, Mackinac retired to Espiritu Santo in the New Hebrides Islands on 12 August 1942.

Despite constant evacuation alerts and numerous search plane losses, Mackinac next set up base at Graciosa Harbor in the Santa Cruz Islands on 20 August 1942. Early on the morning of 12 September 1942, two Japanese submarines surfaced at the harbor entrance to shell Mackinac and the seaplane tender Ballard and their seaplanes. The two seaplane tenders returned fire, but neither side suffered damage.

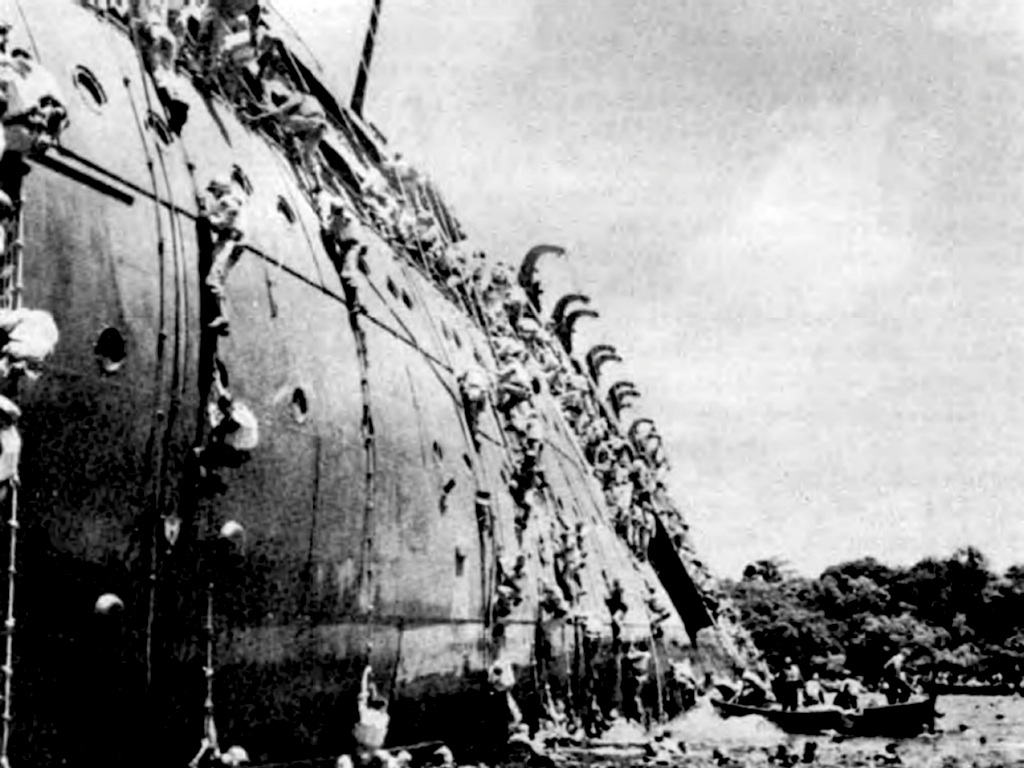
Troop transport SS President Coolidge being abandoned after beaching.

Following her return to Espiritu Santo on 25 October 1942, Mackinac assisted with her boats in rescuing survivors of the United States Army transport SS President Coolidge after President Coolidge struck two naval mines in the harbor entrance and beached herself.

On 12 November 1942, Mackinac established an advanced seaplane base at Vanikolo Island in the Santa Cruz Islands, and began tending an average of six seaplanes a day. Several high-ranking officers visited her during this duty, including Vice Admiral William F. Halsey, Jr.

Mackinac got underway from Espiritu Santo with a convoy for the United States West Coast on 9 July 1943, arriving at San Francisco, California, on 25 July 1943. She then underwent a two-month overhaul at Mare Island Navy Yard at Vallejo, California.

==== Second Pacific tour, 1943-1945 ====
Mackinac returned to Pearl Harbor on 28 September 1943. After a month of transport duty between Midway Atoll and Maui, Hawaii, Mackinac left Pearl Harbor on 20 November 1943 escorting the seaplane tender Curtiss to the Ellice Islands.

When a PBY Catalina flying boat was forced down near Nui in the Gilbert Islands, Mackinac, after locating it early on 24 November 1943, rescued the crew and safely towed the plane to Fenua Tapu despite adverse weather. On 1 December 1943 she arrived at recently secured Tarawa to tend seaplanes there through January 1944, undergoing 22 air raids during her time there.

Mackinac then steamed for Makin Atoll with Patrol Squadron 72 (VP‑72) to participate in the Marshall Islands campaign with around‑the‑clock seaplane tending. With Majuro Atoll and Kwajalein Atoll secured by the early part of February 1944, Mackinac was ordered on to Kwajalein Island, anchoring there on 9 March 1944. While her patrol bombing squadron was conducting rescue operations at Majuro, Makin, Eniwetok, and Kwajalein, Mackinac was laying out the seaplane area and assisting the construction of a naval airbase on Ebeye Kwajalein.

On 23 June 1944, Mackinac departed for Eniwetok en route to Saipan. As the American conquest of Saipan was still in the assault stage, Mackinac was under almost constant Japanese fire while stationed there.

Relieved at Saipan on 19 August 1944, Mackinac joined the seaplane tenders Chandeleur, Pocomoke, Yakutat, and Onslow in sailing for Kossol Passage, Peleliu, in the Palau Islands, arriving on 15 September 1944, one day after the American landings on Pelelieu. For the next three months, Mackinac marked navigational obstructions off Kossol before leaving for Ulithi Atoll on 25 December 1944. On 21 January 1945, Mackinac got underway with Chandeleur for San Diego, California, via Pearl Harbor, arriving at San Diego on 7 February 1945.

==== Third Pacific Tour 1945 ====
Mackinac returned to Saipan in April 1945. On 11 May 1945, she joined a seaplane group based at Kerama Retto in the Ryukyu Islands during the Okinawa campaign, and continued a variety of duties, including air-sea rescue and bombardment of Japanese‑held Rose Island. After the seaplane group moved its operations to Okinawa on 14 July 1945, Mackinac tended motor torpedo boats through early August 1945. After the Japanese capitulation on 15 August 1945, she was assigned to join Task Group 30.5, arriving at Sagami Bay, Tokyo, Japan, on 28 August 1945.

==== Honors and awards ====
Mackinac received six battle stars for her World War Il service.

=== Post-World War II ===
Following occupation duty in Japan, Mackinac left for the United States West Coast on 10 January 1946, arriving at San Pedro, California, on 29 January 1946. After repairs, she sailed for the Gulf of Mexico via the Panama Canal, arriving at Orange, Texas, on 26 March 1946.

Mackinac was decommissioned and entered the Atlantic Reserve Fleet at Orange in January 1947.

== United States Coast Guard service ==
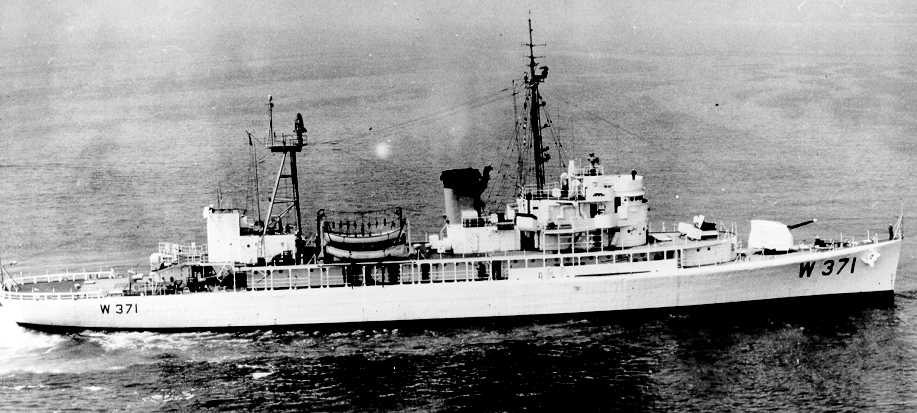
USCGC Mackinac (WAVP-371) ca. 1964, before the Coast Guard's 1967 adoption of the "racing stripe" markings on its ships.

Barnegat-class ships were very reliable and seaworthy and had good habitability, and the Coast Guard viewed them as ideal for ocean station duty, in which they would perform weather reporting and search and rescue tasks, once they were modified by having a balloon shelter added aft and having oceanographic equipment, an oceanographic winch, and a hydrographic winch installed. The U.S. Navy transferred 18 of the ships to the Coast Guard, in which they were known as the Casco-class cutters.

The Navy loaned Mackinac to the Coast Guard on 19 April 1949, and the Coast Guard officially accepted her at Orange on 21 April 1949. The Coast Guard cutter USCGC Tampa then towed her from Orange to the Coast Guard Yard at Curtis Bay in Baltimore, Maryland, where she underwent conversion for use as a weather-reporting ship. While this was in progress, the Coast Guard commissioned her as USCGC Mackinac (WAVP-371) on 11 May 1949. Her conversion was completed on 18 July 1949.

Mackinac was stationed at New York, New York, throughout her Coast Guard career. Her primary duty was to serve on ocean stations in the Atlantic Ocean to gather meteorological data. In addition, she conducted search-and-rescue and law enforcement operations and provided navigational and communication assistance to aircraft.

She was among a number of cutters based on the United States East Coast that rotated among four ocean stations in the Atlantic Ocean. While on duty in one of these stations, she was required to patrol a 210-square-statute-mile (544 km²; 159 nmi²) area for three weeks at a time, leaving the area only when physically relieved by another Coast Guard cutter or in the case of a dire emergency. While on station, she acted as an aircraft check point at the point of no return, a relay point for messages from ships and aircraft, as a source of the latest weather information for passing aircraft, as a floating oceanographic laboratory, and as a search-and-rescue ship for downed aircraft and vessels in distress.

Mackinac's first base at New York City was at Brooklyn, New York. She shifted her base to St. George, Staten Island, New York, on 17 September 1953.

On 13 November 1953, she came to the assistance of the merchant ship Empire Nene at 41°53′00″N 043°47′00″W.

On 1 May 1966, Mackinac was reclassified as a high endurance cutter and redesignated WHEC-371. She won the Eastern Area Vessel Performance Award for Fiscal Year 1967.

== Decommissioning and disposal ==
The Coast Guard decommissioned Mackinac on 28 December 1967 and placed her in reserve at the Coast Guard Yard at Curtis Bay. On 21 July 1968 the Coast Guard returned her to the Navy, and the Navy struck her from the Naval Vessel Register that day.

The Navy sank Mackinac as a target off the coast of Virginia on 23 July 1968, using her for target practice by United States Naval Academy midshipmen. Mackinac sank in 1,800 fathoms (10,800 feet (3,300 m) of water) at position 36°22′00″N 073°09′00″W. Although under fire from four ships – the heavy cruiser USS Newport News, the guided-missile light cruiser USS Springfield, the guided-missile destroyer USS John King, and the destroyer USS New – and despite John King's first Tarter missile scoring a direct hit, Mackinac proved hard to sink, and her hull remained largely intact as she slipped beneath the waves.
