= Halavo Seaplane Base =

- Halavo Bay, Florida Island, Solomon Islands

Site information
- Type: Military Seaplane Base
- Controlled by: United States Navy
- Condition: abandoned

Location
- Coordinates: 9°06′36″S 160°12′25″E

Site history
- Built: 1943
- Built by: Seebees
- In use: 1943–45

Halavo Seaplane Base is a former World War II seaplane base in Halavo Bay, Florida Island, Solomon Islands.

== History ==
The base was constructed by the 6th Naval Construction Battalion commencing in January 1943, the work was taken over by the 34th Naval Construction Battalion on 12 February 1943. A tent camp was built for 1,500 men and 300 officers. Due to a shortage of cement it was decided to use PSP on the seaplane ramps and apron. A temporary PSP seaplane ramp, 25-foot (7.6 m) wide, was completed by May 1943. At the end of June, another temporary PSP ramp was built for use by a second PBY squadron operating from the base. Construction of a 12,000-barrel tank farm including a filling line to the beach and a delivery line to the ramp was also completed together with 30 wooden buildings for administration and workshops. The PSP ramps were considered wholly satisfactory in service, and it was estimated that their substitution for concrete saved approximately two months' construction time.

In late 1943, expansion of the base was begun with an increase in apron area, structures more permanent than the original canvas-covered ones, and the reconstruction of housing facilities. Two PSP ramps each 50-foot (15 m) wide, and a coral apron, 150-foot (46 m) by 850-foot (260 m), were installed. Dock facilities were constructed, consisting of a small-boat wharf, 16-foot (4.9 m) by 72-foot (22 m) and a boat refueling wharf, 6-foot (1.8 m) by 50-foot (15 m). Twelve screened frame wards with canvas roofing were provided for a 200-bed bas hospital.

In September, ten Quonset huts, 20-foot (6.1 m) by 48-foot (15 m), were erected for accommodation. By December 3 PBY squadrons occupied the base.

US Navy units based at the base included:

- VP-33 June 1943
- VPB-23 August–December 1943
- VPB-44 January–May 1943
- VPB-91 October 1943–January 1944
- VPB-197 December 1943–January 1944

No. 6 (Flying Boat) Squadron RNZAF was based at Halavo from Christmas 1943 until the end of the war, carrying out marine surveillance and air-sea rescue tasks, including rescuing 69 US and 2 New Zealand servicemen. On 26 October 1944 the CO of the Squadron took over command of Halavo from the US Navy.

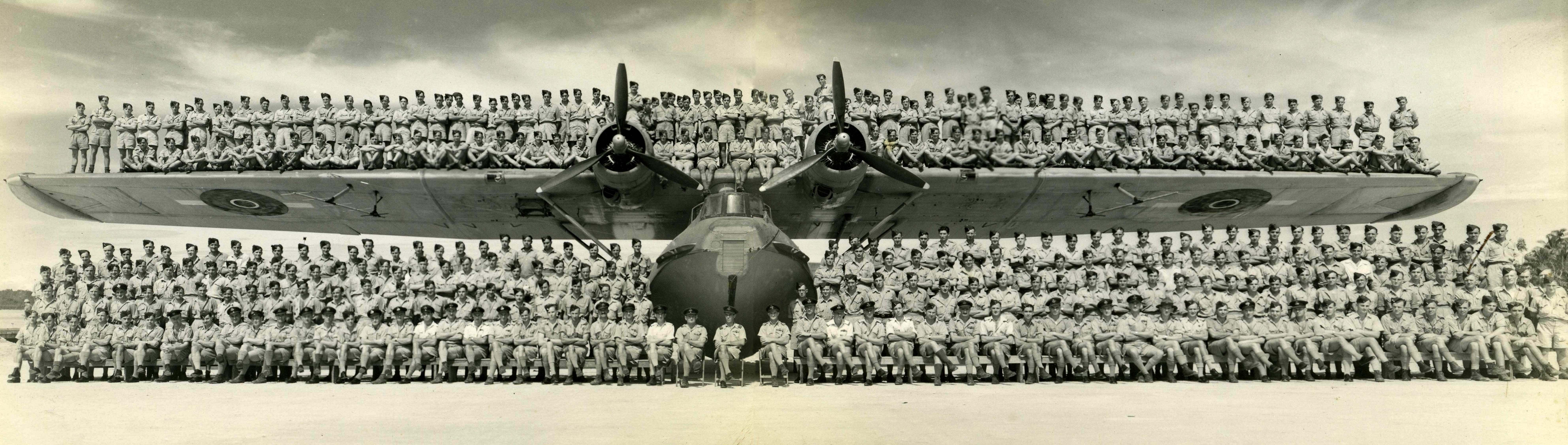
Personnel of Royal New Zealand Air Force's No. 6 Squadron on a Consolidated Aircraft PBY-5 Catalina at Halavo Bay Seaplane Base, Solomon Islands

== See also ==
- Guadalcanal Campaign
- Japanese destroyer Kikuzuki (1926)
- US Naval Base Solomons
