= USS St. George (AV-16) =

Tender of the United States Navy

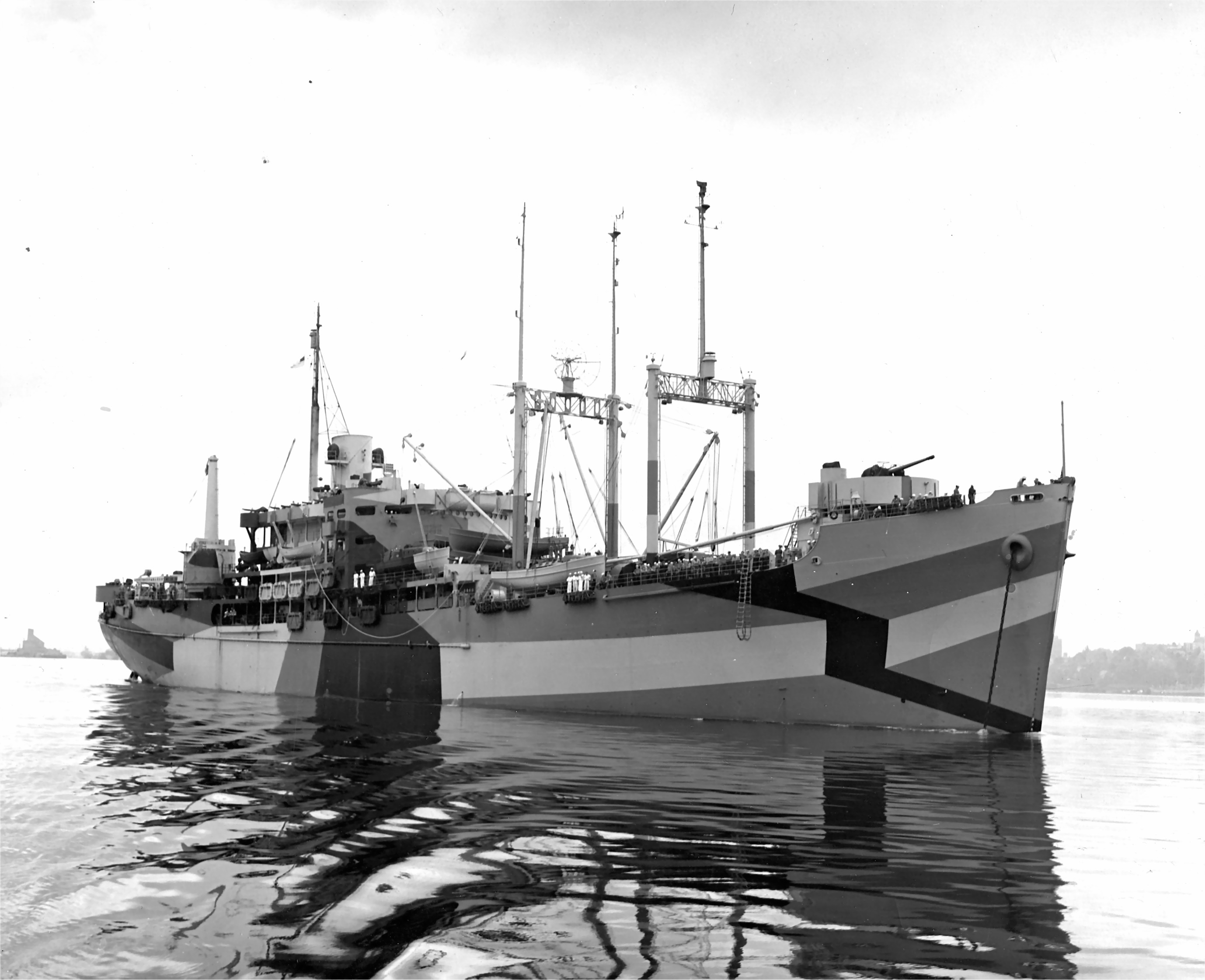
- USS St. George (AV-16)

History

United States
- Name: USS St. George
- Namesake: St. George Sound in Apalachicola Bay, Florida
- Builder: Seattle-Tacoma Shipbuilding Corporation, Tacoma, Washington
- Laid down: 4 August 1943
- Launched: 14 February 1944
- Commissioned: 24 July 1944
- Decommissioned: 1 August 1946
- Stricken: 1 July 1963
- Honors and awards: 1 battle star (World War II)
- Fate: Sold to Italy

Italy
- Name: Andrea Bafile (A 5314)
- Namesake: Andrea Bafile, a Gold Medal of Military Valor recipient
- Acquired: 11 December 1968
- Decommissioned: 1981
- Fate: unknown

General characteristics
- Class & type: Kenneth Whiting-class seaplane tender
- Displacement: 8,510 long tons (8,647 t) light; 12,610 long tons (12,812 t) full
- Length: 492 ft (150 m)
- Beam: 69 ft 5 in (21.16 m)
- Draft: 22 ft (6.7 m)
- Propulsion: Steam turbine, 2 boilers, 1 shaft, 8,500 hp (6,338 kW)
- Speed: 18.7 knots (34.6 km/h; 21.5 mph)
- Complement: 1,077
- Armament: 2 × single 5"/38 caliber guns; 2 × quad 40 mm AA gun mounts; 2 × dual 40 mm AA gun mounts; 16 × single 20 mm AA gun mounts

USS St. George (AV-16) was a Kenneth Whiting-class seaplane tender in the United States Navy.

St. George was laid down on 4 August 1943 by the Seattle-Tacoma Shipbuilding Corporation, Tacoma, Washington, launched on 14 February 1944, sponsored by Mrs. Alfred E. Montgomery; and commissioned on 24 July 1944.

== World War II Pacific Theatre operations ==
After shakedown, St. George sailed from San Pedro, California, on 12 October 1944 to salvage a seaplane which had crashed at sea. She was diverted to Pearl Harbor after word was received that the plane had sunk.

After four days in Pearl Harbor, the ship sailed on 22 October to tend seaplanes in support of the Central Pacific drive. She stopped at Kwajalein between 29 October and 3 November, and then tended a squadron of aircraft at Eniwetok between 4 and 25 November. She moved frequently during the next four months, tending planes at Saipan between 28 November and 21 December; at Kossol Passage, Palau Islands, from 24 December 1944 to 6 February 1945, at Ulithi between 7 and 25 February, and at Saipan again from 27 February to 23 March. On 28 March, she arrived at Kerama Retto, Ryukyus, to support aircraft in the Okinawa operation.

== Under attack by Japanese aircraft ==
During one of the frequent air raids there the ship's gunners shot down an enemy plane on 29 April 1945. A week later, she was hit by a kamikaze. Thanks to a warning from Louis (Jack) Norvelle Tickle, an airplane mechanic who had been on deck at the time and was able to spot the Japanese before they hit, only three men were killed. Unfortunately, her seaplane crane was destroyed. Nevertheless, the tender remained on station, using a barge crane to lift seaplanes for repairs; and, in addition, provided repair support to destroyers and destroyer escorts.

== Post-War operations ==
She left Kerama Retto on 12 July for drydocking and repairs at Guam, returning on 21 August to Okinawa, where she rode out a typhoon on 16 and 17 September. On 20 September, the seaplane tender sailed to Wakayama Wan, Japan, where her aircraft provided surveillance of the Japanese Inland Sea and supplied passenger, mail, and courier service between Tokyo, Sasebo, and Okinawa. While there, she rode out two more typhoons. The ship proceeded to Sasebo on 14 November and tended aircraft there from 16 November until starting home on 12 February 1946.

== Post-War decommissioning ==
She arrived at San Diego, California, on 25 March 1946 and was decommissioned and placed in reserve there on 1 August 1946. USS St. George was struck from the Navy list on 1 July 1963 and simultaneously transferred to the Maritime Administration's reserve fleet at Suisun Bay, California.

== Andrea Bafile (L 9871) ==
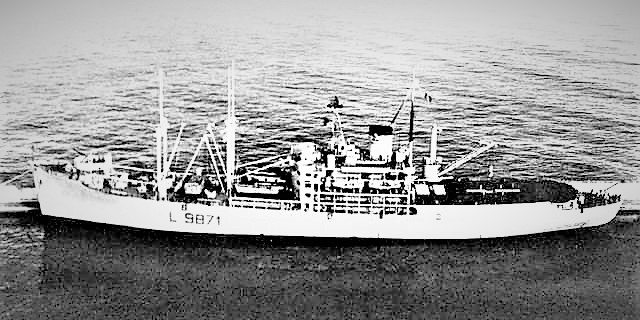
Italian navy ship Andrea Bafile

She was reacquired by the U.S. Navy on 11 December 1968 for sale to Italy as Andrea Bafile (L 9871) as a transport ship for the 1st San Marco Regiment. She was decommissioned in 1981 and stricken on 31 July 1985 but was used until May 1988 as barracks ship in the Taranto Arsenal.

== Awards ==
USS St. George received one battle star for her World War II service.
