= USS Chandeleur =

Tender of the United States Navy

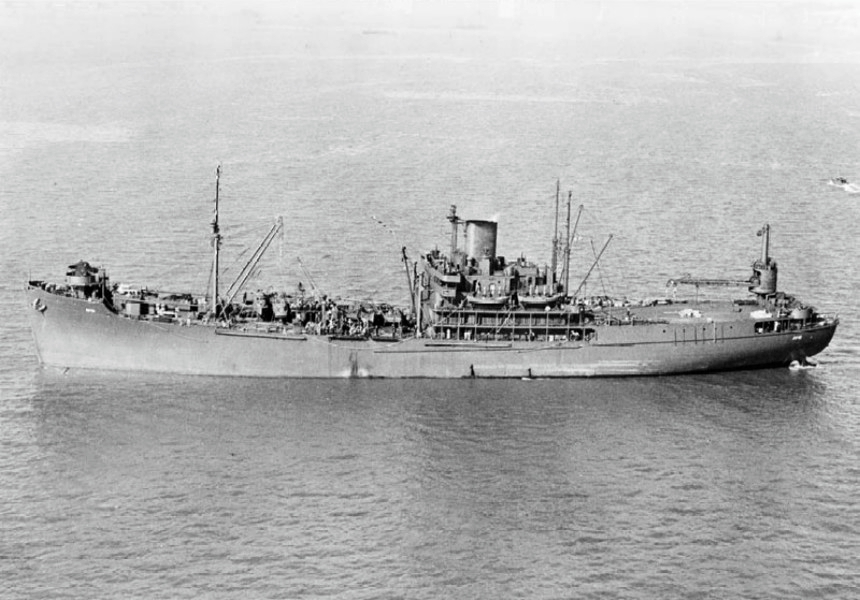
- USS Chandeleur (AV-10)

History

United States
- Name: USS Chandeleur
- Namesake: Chandeleur Sound in Louisiana
- Builder: Western Pipe & Steel
- Laid down: 29 May 1941
- Launched: 29 November 1941
- Sponsored by: Mrs. F. McCrary
- Christened: Chandeleur
- Completed: 19 November 1942
- Commissioned: 19 November 1942
- Decommissioned: 12 February 1947
- Stricken: 1 April 1971
- Honours and awards: Five battle stars for service in World War II.
- Fate: Scrapped 1971
- Notes: WPS Hull no. 64.; MARCOM Hull no. 173.; Type C3-S1-B1.

General characteristics
- Class & type: Chandeleur class seaplane tender
- Displacement: 5,300 lt tons, 13,700 fl tons
- Length: 492 ft (150 m)
- Beam: 69 ft 6 in (21.18 m)
- Draught: 23 ft 9 in (7.24 m)
- Propulsion: 2 × General Electric steam turbines, 2 × Foster-Wheeler boilers, single shaft, single propeller, horsepower 9,350
- Speed: 18 knots (33 km/h)
- Complement: 1075
- Armament: 1 × single 5-inch/38 cal. dual-purpose gun mount.; 4 × 3-inch/50 cal. gun mounts.; 4 × twin 40 mm AA gun mounts.; 15 × single 20 mm AA gun mounts.

USS Chandeleur (AV-10), a seaplane tender, was launched on 29 November 1941 by Western Pipe and Steel Company, San Francisco, California, under a Maritime Commission contract; transferred to the U.S. Navy 19 November 1942; and commissioned the same day.

== Operational history ==
=== Cargo and tender operations ===
From 15 January to 9 May 1943, Chandeleur supported South Pacific bases and operations by carrying cargo from San Diego to Efate, Espiritu Santo, Samoa, and Nouméa. She cleared San Diego 3 June with cargo for Pearl Harbor, Midway, and Wallis, and arrived at Espiritu Santo 1 July. Here she provided tender services to, and served as base for, Patrol Squadron 71 (VP-71) until 13 October.

=== Eniwetok and Saipan ===
Chandeleur returned to cargo duty, now in support of the Treasuries-Bougainville operations. Until 2 March 1944, she sailed between the New Hebrides Islands and Guadalcanal, carrying men and aviation equipment. Following overhaul on the west coast, the seaplane tender made a cargo voyage to Pearl Harbor, then cleared Oakland, California, 18 May for Kwajalein and Eniwetok, arriving 21 June. At both Eniwetok and Saipan, Chandeleur tended Patrol Squadrons 202 and 216 as they flew missions during the invasion and capture of the Palau Islands.

=== Philippines ===
In September 1944, with commander, Fleet Air Wing 1 embarked, Chandeleur sailed to Naval Base Kossol Roads, where she tended seaplanes providing part of the air cover for the long-awaited invasion of the Philippines. At Ulithi from 25 December until 8 February 1945, she provided tender services for Patrol Squadron 21.

=== Sinking of I-8 and spotting of Yamato at Okinawa ===
Chandeleur arrived at Kerama Retto 28 March 1945. Her seaplanes supported the invasion of Okinawa, covering the initial assault 1 April. These planes took part in sinking Japanese submarine I-8 off Okinawa on 31 March and on 7 April spotted the battleship Yamato, which was promptly sunk by carrier planes. On 15 July, the seaplane base was moved to Okinawa, where Chandeleur continued to tend seaplanes in support of the pounding Third Fleet raids on the Japanese home islands.

=== After hostilities ===
After a brief call at Eniwetok, Chandeleur sailed for Ominato Ko, Honshū, Japan, where she tended seaplanes taking part in the occupation of Japan until 16 October. After a west coast overhaul, Chandeleur sailed to the Philippines to embark men for transportation to Seattle, Washington, where she arrived 11 January 1946. She proceeded to the east coast, and was placed in the Atlantic Reserve Fleet, Philadelphia 12 February 1947. She was struck from the Navy Vessel Register on 1 April 1971 and scrapped in the same year.

Chandeleur received five battle stars for World War II service.
