= USS Pocomoke (AV-9) =

Tender of the United States Navy

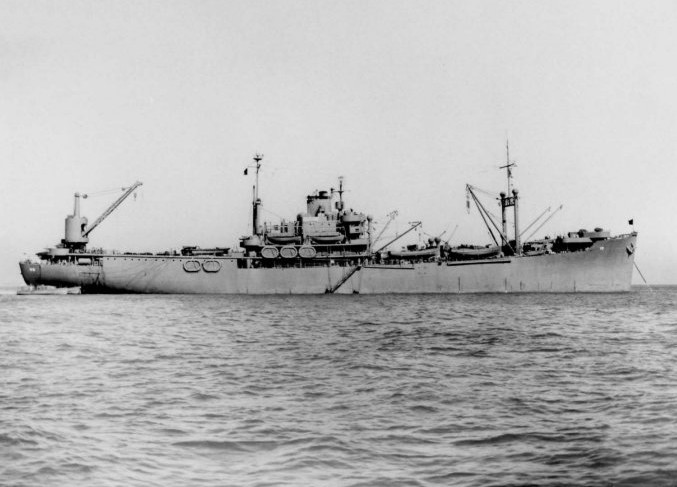
- USS Pocomoke (AV-9) off San Francisco, May 1943

History

United States
- Name: USS Pocomoke
- Builder: Ingalls Shipbuilding
- Laid down: 14 August 1939
- Launched: 8 June 1940, as SS Exchequer
- Acquired: 16 October 1940
- Commissioned: 18 July 1941, as USS Pocomoke (AV-9)
- Decommissioned: 10 July 1946
- Stricken: 1 June 1961
- Fate: Sold, 12 December 1961

General characteristics
- Class & type: Pocomoke-class seaplane tender
- Displacement: 8,950 long tons (9,094 t)
- Length: 492 ft (150 m)
- Beam: 69 ft 6 in (21.18 m)
- Draft: 21 ft 2 in (6.45 m)
- Propulsion: Steam turbine, 8,500 hp (6,338 kW), 1 shaft
- Speed: 17 knots (20 mph; 31 km/h)
- Complement: 689
- Armament: 1 × 5"/38 caliber gun; 4 × 3"/50 caliber guns

Service record
- Part of: Atlantic Fleet (1941–1942); Pacific Fleet (1942–1946); Atlantic Reserve Fleet (1946–1961)
- Awards: 2 Battle stars for World War II

USS Pocomoke (AV-9) was a Pocomoke-class seaplane tender, originally built as the SS Exchequer and acquired by the U.S. Navy as the military build-up occurred in the United States just prior to World War II. She operated principally in the Pacific Theatre of the war and serviced military seaplanes. At war's end, she returned to the United States with two battle stars.

She was built on 14 August 1939 by Ingalls Shipbuilding and Dry Dock Company, Pascagoula, Mississippi, for the Maritime Commission; launched 8 June 1940; sponsored by Mrs. Marian Barkley Truitt, wife of Max O. Truitt, Maritime Commissioner; acquired by the Navy 16 October 1940; and following conversion commissioned 18 July 1941.

== Initial Atlantic Ocean operations ==
When the United States entered World War II in December 1941, Pocomoke was attached to Task Group 4.3 of the Support Force, Atlantic Fleet, stationed at Argentia, Newfoundland. She tended two patrol planes which scouted waters approaching the harbor searching for German U-boats which threatened convoys carrying desperately needed war material to England. On 9 January 1942 she departed Argentia en route to Naval Station Norfolk, Virginia, where she entered the yard for alterations.

Following training and exercises she departed Boston, Massachusetts, 21 May for Argentia to act as flagship for Commander, Task Force 24, and tender for Commander, Patrol Wing 7. Returning to Boston 15 August, she proceeded via Norfolk to Guantanamo Bay, Cuba. She discharged cargo there and at Trinidad, and steamed back to Norfolk 8 October.

== World War II Pacific Theater operations ==
On 30 October Pocomoke got underway, transited the Panama Canal, and proceeded via Seymour Bay, Galapagos Islands, to San Diego, California, 27 November. Then steaming to San Francisco, California, she sailed 2 December for Pearl Harbor where she discharged spare parts and supplies.

After returning to the U.S. West Coast for additional supplies, Pocomoke sailed to Pearl Harbor 4 January 1943, then, escorted by USS Breese, proceeded to the Fiji Islands where she unloaded cargo. Following her return to the United States via Christmas Island and Pearl Harbor, she carried supplies and spare parts to Oahu 23 February to 11 March, and returned to San Francisco for repairs at Oakland, California, until 6 May.

The next day she weighed anchor for Hawaii where she took on supplies and equipment at Pearl Harbor, and pushed on to Noumea, New Caledonia. On 6 June she embarked men of Patrol Bombing Squadrons VPB-15 and VPB-23 at Espiritu Santo and provided vital tender services in the area until sailing for Pearl Harbor 18 September. There she loaded cargo for Fleet Air Photograph Squadron 3 and sailed 1 October for Canton Island. She returned to San Diego 21 October. One week later she steamed with cargo and passengers for Pearl Harbor and continued on to Palmyra Island, Tutuila, Efate Island, and Espiritu Santo, off-loading much needed parts and supplies at these points before returning to Alameda, California, 14 December.

== Making the rounds over vast distances ==
Pocomoke continued her vital services, taking on Marine Night Fighter Squadron 532 (VMF(N)-532) with planes, rolling stock and equipment and sailed via Pearl Harbor to Funafuti Atoll, anchoring there 11 January 1944. With USS Tisdale she steamed for Tarawa and returned to Hawaii 25 January. Another brief return to the West Coast was followed by a stopover at Pearl Harbor to take on troops and ammunition destined for Espiritu Santo. Shuttling cargo and fighting men between Espiritu Santo and Guadalcanal consumed Pocomoke’s efforts until she sailed 4 April among the islands of the Solomons group, dispensing needed services, and back to Espiritu Santo. She tended seaplanes at Kwajalein and Eniwetok before anchoring off Saipan 15 June to begin operations for Patrol Squadron 16 which were continued until 12 September. She departed for Kossol Passage, Palau Islands where she continued her repair and supply functions until 23 November. She finally sailed via Ulithi, Eniwetok, and Pearl Harbor for San Francisco, arriving 15 December.

== Philippine Islands support ==
Late January 1945, saw Pocomoke again underway for Pearl Harbor and Manus Island to report for duty with Commander, Air Force, U.S. 7th Fleet 18 February. She returned to the task of ferrying supplies and passengers, getting underway for San Pedro Bay, Leyte Gulf, and Samar Island. She then tended seaplanes at Palawan Island and Tawitawi Island, for the duration of the active fighting war in the Pacific.

On 28 August 1945 administrative command changed to Commander Philippine Sea Frontier, and 9 September Pocomoke set course for Sangley Point, Manila Bay. From 11 September 1945 through 1 February 1946, she steamed among the various islands in the Philippine group, dispensing her services, providing supplies, ferrying troops, and operating search patrols wherever needed.

== Post-war inactivation and decommissioning ==
Pocomoke returned to San Diego 28 February 1946 and transited the Panama Canal 11 March to report for duty to Commander, Air Force, Atlantic. She was ordered to Norfolk, unloaded her ammunition and steamed into Philadelphia, Pennsylvania, where she was placed in the reserve group of the Atlantic Reserve Fleet. Pocomoke decommissioned 10 July 1946 her name was struck from the Navy List 1 June 1961, she was ordered disposed 20 September 1961, and was sold 12 December 1961 to the Union Minerals and Alloys Corporation.
