= Philippines–South Vietnam relations =

- Philippines: South Vietnam

The Philippines–South Vietnam relations refers to the bilateral relations of the Republic of the Philippines and the now defunct-Republic of Vietnam. The Philippines was an ally to South Vietnam during the Vietnam War providing humanitarian aid.

== History ==
The people of the Philippines and Vietnam had a history of maritime trading prior to the colonization of both countries by Western powers. Following the independence of both countries, the Philippines under President Ramon Magsaysay established official contact with South Vietnam in 1954. In the later half of the 1950s, South Vietnamese President Ngo Dinh Diem lobbied for diplomatic recognition of Asian states including the Philippines while Magsaysay was focusing on building relations with the "Free World" which consists of democratic states in Asia and the United States. Senator Claro M. Recto advised against the Philippines officially recognizing South Vietnam believing that it would bring embarrassment to the country since he concludes that the South would inevitably lose to the Communist North as well as is concerned that the Philippines is being used advance United States interest. Magsaysay then extended the Philippines' official recognition of South Vietnam on July 14, 1955. In 1959, Philippine President Carlos P. Garcia signed a Treaty of Friendship with South Vietnam.

=== Philippine involvement in the Vietnam War ===
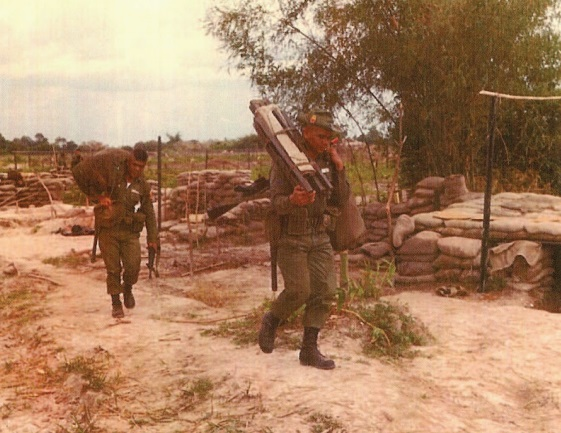
Members of the Philippine Civic Action Group (PHILCAG) arriving in Tây Ninh, South Vietnam. 1966

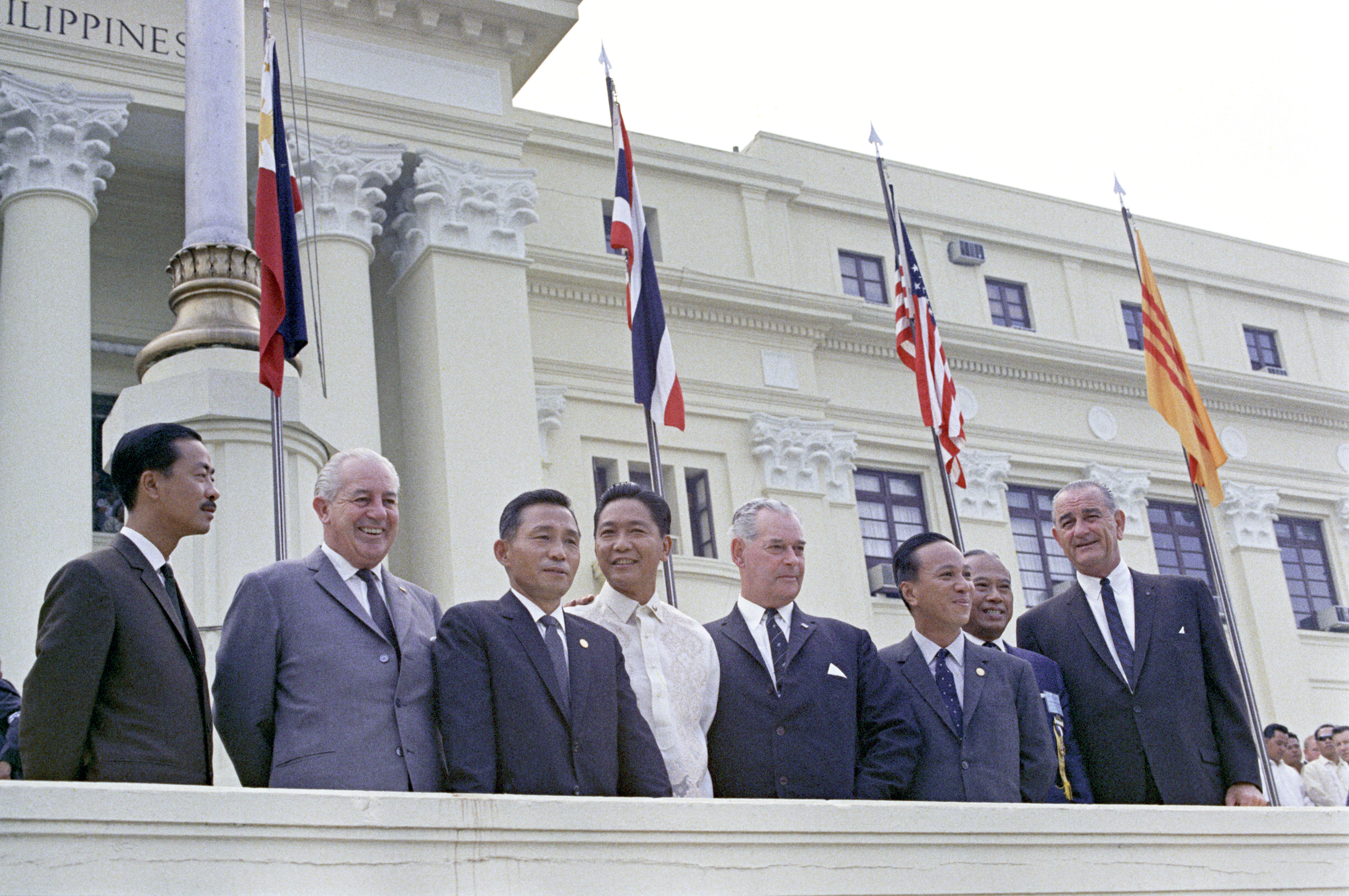
The participanting leaders of the Manila Summit Conference in front of the Congress Building in Manila, hosted by Philippine President Ferdinand Marcos on 24 October 1966

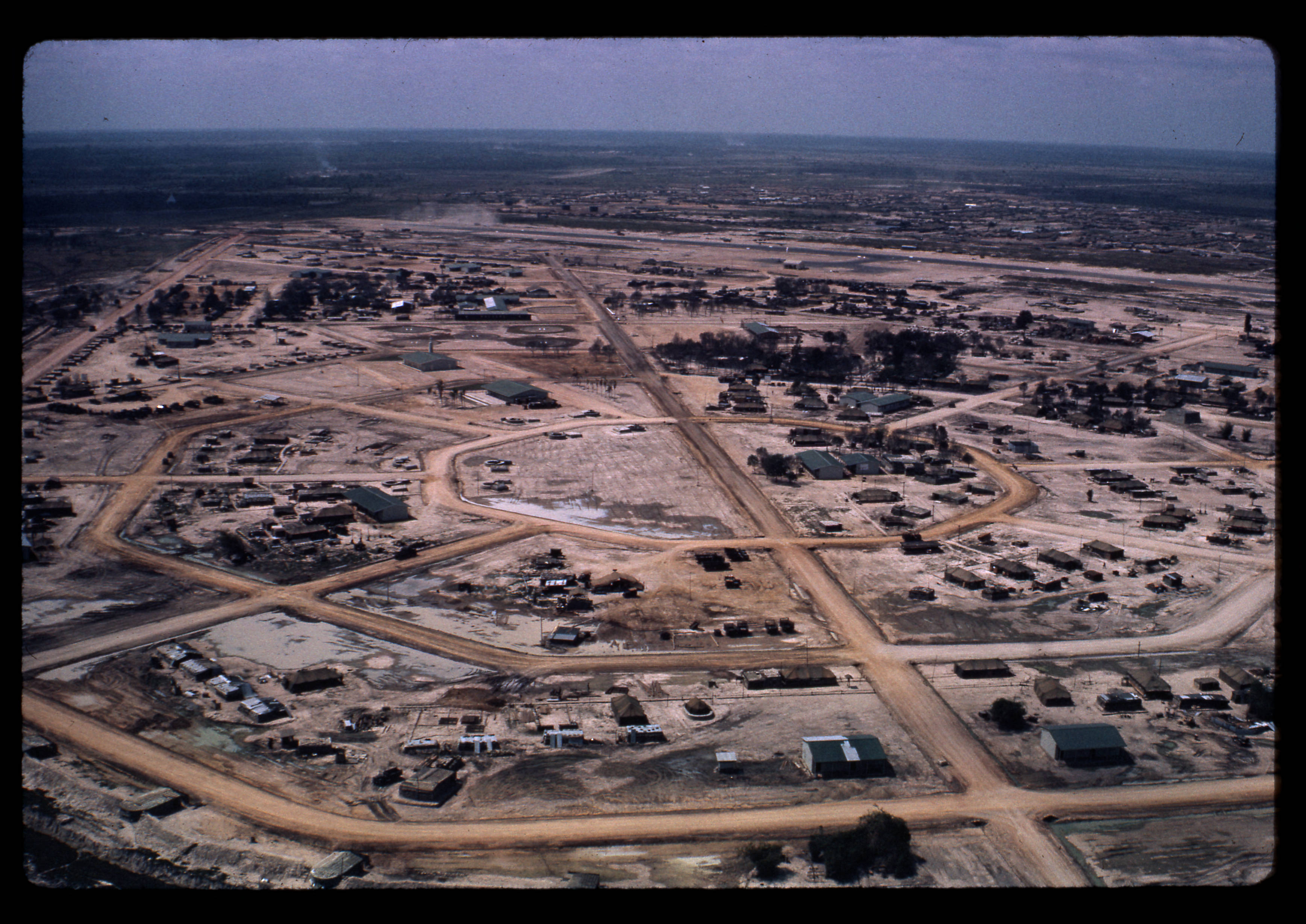
PHILCAG camp, Tay Ninh, 29 January 1967

Some Filipino medics went to South Vietnam for humanitarian aid in the Vietnam War, with the approval of Magsaysay in 1954. Their efforts were known as Operation Brotherhood, which received international support in order to help the operation's goals to aid the Vietnamese refugees.

In July 1964, South Vietnam asked the Philippines for assistance against its belligerents in the North when Major General Nguyễn Khánh sent a note to President Diosdado Macapagal asking for aid in the Vietnam War. In August 1964, the first Philippine contingent (PHILCON I) was sent to South Vietnam in 1965 after Macapagal secured the consent of the Congress. The contingent initially consisted of 16 individuals who were doctors, nurses, technicians, and civic action officers from the Armed Forces of the Philippines. Aside from humanitarian aid, the contingent was also involved in psychological warfare according to the official records of the United States' Military Assistance Command, Vietnam.

On April 14, 1965, Prime Minister Phan Huy Quát sent a letter to the Philippine President stating South Vietnam's dire need for military assistance. In the same letter, Prime Minister Quát hopes to see about 2,000 Filipino soldiers sent to South Vietnam. President Macapagal asked the Congress for the fulfillment of South Vietnam's request but was not able to send a second contingent, the Philippine Civic Action Group (PHILCAG) due to dispute which involves him insisting the United States to fund the contingent. As of June 1966, they were 73 Filipinos involved in the war effort.

Macapagal was succeeded by the Ferdinand Marcos, who was not initially in favor of sending a second contingent, following the 1965 Philippine presidential elections. The United States was partially successful in convincing Marcos to retract his stance after five diplomatic missions. While he was remained firm in not sending combat troops in South Vietnam, he opened to the possibility of sending more troops to provide humanitarian aid. The plan to send a second contingent to South Vietnam was approved by the Congress on July 14, 1966, under Republic Act No. 4664. Under Marcos he did not allow the United States to fully fund the formation of the contingent since he believed the Filipinos would be treated as mercenaries by the Americans if they did so. The South Vietnam government accepted the Philippines offer of a second contingent on August 15, 1966, while PHILCAG commander, General Gaudencio V. Tobias receiving order from Marcos to secretly establish contact with the Viet Cong so that the Philippines could act as an intermediary for a peace negotiation since there is a belief in the country that North Vietnam would not be hostile to idea due to PHILCAG's non-combat role in the war.

The Philippines hosted the Manila Summit Conference in October 1966, where six countries promised aid to South Vietnam against the communist North. There was some opposition regarding the deployment of the Philippine Civic Action Group to South Vietnam by academics, students, and laborers who held protests during the summit. The Vietnam Aid Bill in the Philippine Congress was also opposed by a significant minority.

The Philippine Civic Action Group while primarily involved in rebuilding roads and providing humanitarian aid were occasionally involved in defensive operations. It was involved in Operation Attleboro where 4 of its personnel were wounded. By the end of the 1966, the Philippines had 2,063 personnel in South Vietnam.

The South Vietnam government intercepted the secret plan of Marcos to establish ties with the Viet Cong and Tobias reasoned that the Philippines was negotiating for an arrangement that would lead to the Viet Cong forces "leaving the PHILCAG contingent alone". In 1968, Marcos expressed openness to the establishing of ties with the Eastern bloc countries and started the process reversing the country's anti-communist policy.

In 1969, the Philippines began withdrawing its contingent and by the 1973, the recall was completed. From 1964 to 1973, nine Filipino personnel were killed in action as well as four others due to other causes. The Philippine embassy in Saigon ceased operations on April 29, 1975. Official ties were established with the now unified and communist Vietnam in 1976.

=== Rescue of USS Kirk-escorted refugee ===
In 1975 the Philippines accepted 30,000 Vietnamese refugees boarding naval ships of the South Vietnamese Navy which were escorted by the USS Kirk. The Marcos government initially was not amenable to accepting the refugees to avoid creating tension with the now unified Communist government in Vietnam. The United States switched the Vietnamese flags on the ships with United States flags to convince the Philippine government to receive the ships. The South Vietnamese ships were eventually turned over to the Philippine Navy.

Ships turned over to the Philippine Navy

BRP Rajah Lakandula as the RVNS Trần Hưng Đạo.

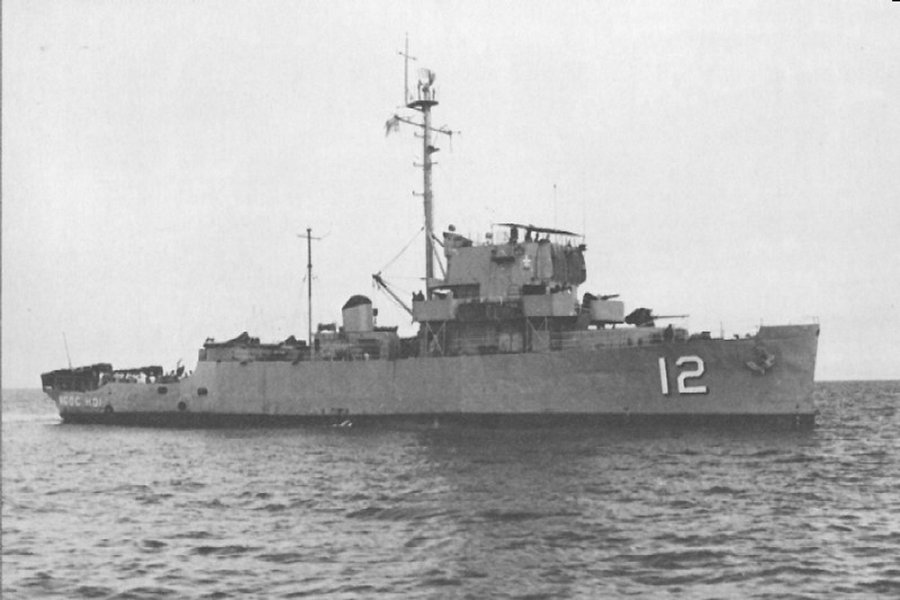
BRP Miguel Malvar as the RVNS Ngọc Hồi.

The following South Vietnamese ships which escaped to the Philippines in April 1975 which were recommissioned as Philippine Navy ships.

Name	Type	Acquired by South Vietnam	Formerly	Recommissioned by the Philippines as
RVNS Trần Hưng Đạo (HQ-1)	Destroyer	13 February 1971	USS Camp (DE-251)	BRP Rajah Lakandula (PF-4).
RVNS Trần Quang Khải (HQ-02)	Frigate	1 January 1971	USCGC Bering Strait (WAVP-382)	BRP Diego Silang (PF-9).
RVNS Trần Bình Trọng (HQ-05)	Frigate	21 December 1971	USCGC Castle Rock (WAVP-383)	BRP Francisco Dagohoy (PF-10).
RVNS Lý Thường Kiệt (HQ-16)	Frigate	21 June 1972	USCGC Chincoteague (WAVP-375)	BRP Andrés Bonifacio (PF-7).
RVNS Ngô Quyền (HQ-17)	Frigate	21 June 1972	USCGC McCulloch (WAVP-386)	BRP Gregorio del Pilar (PF-8).
RVNS Đống Đa II (HQ-07)	Patrol craft escort	29 November 1961	USS Crestview (PCE-895)	BRP Sultan Kudarat (PS-22).
RVNS Ngọc Hồi (HQ-12)	Patrol craft escort	11 July 1966	USS Brattleboro (PCE(R)-852)	BRP Miguel Malvar (PS-19).
RVNS Van Kiếp II (HQ-14)	Patrol craft escort	1970	USS Amherst (PCE(R)-853)	BRP Datu Marikudo (PS-23).
RVNS Chi Lăng II (HQ-08)	Fleet minesweeper	17 April 1962	USS Gayety (AM-239)	BRP Magat Salamat (PS-20).
RVNS Chí Linh (HQ-11)	Fleet minesweeper	24 January 1964	USS Shelter (AM-301)	BRP Datu Tupas (PS-18).
RVNS Đoàn Ngọc Tang (HQ-228)	Landing Ship Support Large	15 September 1956	USS LSSL-9	BRP La Union (LF-50).
RVNS Nguyễn Ngọc Long (HQ-230)	Landing Ship Support Large	?	USS LSSL-96	BRP Sulu (LF-49).
RVNS Nguyễn Đức Bóng (HQ-231)	Landing Ship Support Large	19 February 1966	USS LSSL-129	BRP Camarines Sur (LF-48).
RVNS Hát Giang (HQ-400)	Landing Ship Medium - Hospital	Unknown	USS LSM-335	BRP Western Samar (LP-66).
RVNS Hương Giang (HQ-404)	Landing Ship Medium	1 August 1961	USS Oceanside (LSM-175)	BRP Batanes (LP-65).
RVNS Cam Ranh (HQ-500)	Landing Ship Tank	12 April 1962	USS Marion County (LST-975)	BRP Zamboanga Del Sur (LT-86).
RVNS Thị Nại (HQ-502)	Landing Ship Tank	17 December 1963	USS Cayuga County (LST-529)	BRP Cotabato Del Sur (LT-87).
RVNS Nha Trang (HQ-505)	Landing Ship Tank	April 1970	USS Jerome County (LST-848)	BRP Agusan Del Sur (LT-54).
RVNS Hòn Trọc (HQ-618)	Patrol Gunboat Medium	?	PGM-83	BRP Basilan (PG-60).
RVNS My Tho (HQ-800)	Patrol Craft Tender	12 October 1970	USS Harnett County (LST-821)	BRP Sierra Madre (LT-57).
RVNS Can Tho (HQ-801)	Patrol Craft Tender	23 April 1971	USS Garrett County (LST-786)	BRP Kalinga Apayao (LT-516)
RVNS Vinh Long (HQ-802)	Landing Craft Repair Ship	30 September 1971	USS Satyr (ARL-23)	BRP Yakal (AR-617).

== Economic relations ==
Filipino businessmen set up ventures to aid South Vietnam's war economy. Filipino migrant workers were also employed in South Vietnam, with thousands employed in American construction firms with presence in the Indochina region including South Vietnam. Some worked in night clubs and bars which were frequented by American soldiers stationed in South Vietnam.

== Diplomatic mission and visits ==
In October 1955, the Philippines opened a temporary office in Saigon. On December 1, the permanent chancery was opened at 1 Rue Aux Fluera, across the present day Bitexco Financial Tower, with Amb. Mariano Espeleta heading the mission. South Vietnam as well established an embassy in Manila with the Chief Minister Cao Thai Bao heading the mission. South Vietnamese President Ngo Dinh Diem made a visit in the Philippines in the late 1950s while Philippine President Carlos P. Garcia made a state visit to South Vietnam from April 22 to 26, 1959.

By early 1975, the Philippine Embassy staff were reduced to critical staff. The Philippine Embassy to South Vietnam was permanently closed on April 29, 1975, a day before Saigon fell to the North Vietnamese forces. Amb. Agustin Mangila and his two remaining staff were evacuated among the many during Operation Frequent Wind.

== Territorial dispute ==
South Vietnam was also a claimant of the Spratly Islands which the Philippines also claims. Both countries had control in some of the islands during South Vietnam's existence. Despite being allies in the Vietnam War, South Vietnam seized control of the Southwest Cay in 1975 which was formerly controlled by the Filipinos. Filipino soldiers guarding Southwest Cay went to Northeast Cay for the birthday celebration of their commanding officer but a storm forced to delay they return to Southwest Cay. The South Vietnamese took the opportunity to establish control and hoisted the South Vietnamese flag in lieu of the Philippine flag raised in the island. It was reported that South Vietnam sent prostitutes to the Filipino soldiers' commanding officers' party to lure them out of Southwest Cay. The island fall under the control of Communist Vietnamese forces when South Vietnam was disestablished following the Fall of Saigon.
