= BRP Gregorio del Pilar =

BRP Gregorio del Pilar has been the name of more than one Philippine Navy ship, and may refer to:

- BRP Gregorio del Pilar (PF-8), an Andrés Bonifacio-class frigate, formerly RVNS Ngô Quyền, she was acquired in 1976 and discarded in 1990
- BRP Gregorio del Pilar (PS-15), a Gregorio del Pilar-class frigate, formerly USCGC Hamilton, she was acquired in 2011
