= BRP Andrés Bonifacio =

BRP Andrés Bonifacio has been the name of more than one Philippine Navy ship, and may refer to:

- BRP Andrés Bonifacio (PF-7), an Andrés Bonifacio-class frigate formerly RVNS Lý Thường Kiệt she was acquired in 1976 and sold for scrap in 2003
- BRP Andrés Bonifacio (PS-17), a Gregorio del Pilar-class frigate formerly USCGC Boutwell she was acquired in 2016
