= USS Chincoteague =

Tender of the United States Navy

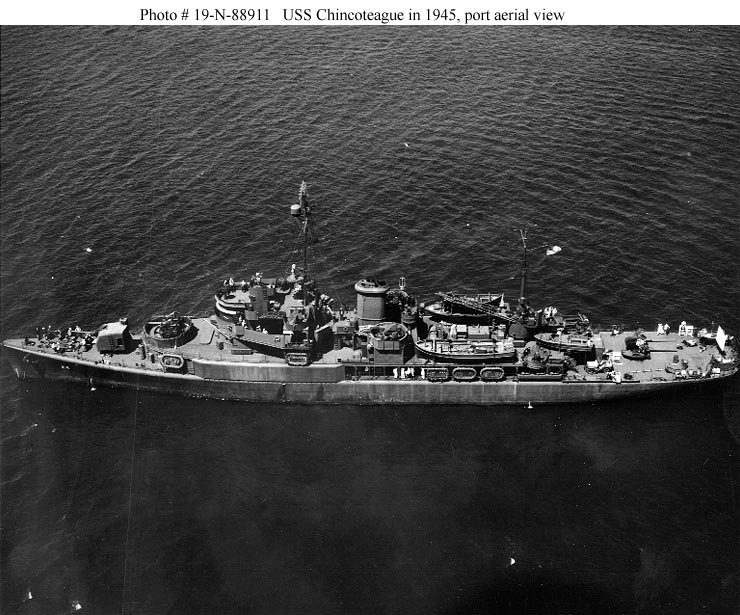
- USS Chincoteague (AVP-24) off the United States West Coast in mid-1945 after an overhaul.

History

United States
- Name: USS Chincoteague (AVP-24)
- Namesake: Chincoteague Bay, on the coast of Maryland and Virginia
- Builder: Lake Washington Shipyard, Houghton, Washington
- Laid down: 23 July 1941
- Launched: 15 April 1942
- Sponsored by: Mrs. Doris W. Rowe
- Commissioned: 12 April 1943
- Decommissioned: 21 December 1946
- Honors and awards: Six battle stars for World War II service
- Fate: Loaned to United States Coast Guard 7 March 1949; Transferred outright to Coast Guard 26 September 1966
- Acquired: Transferred from U.S Coast Guard 21 June 1972
- Fate: Transferred to South Vietnam 21 June 1972

United States
- Name: USCGC Chincoteague (WAVP-375)
- Namesake: Previous name retained
- Acquired: Loaned by U.S. Navy to U.S. Coast Guard 7 March 1949; Transferred permanently to Coast Guard 26 September 1966
- Commissioned: 7 March 1949
- Reclassified: High endurance cutter, WHEC-375, 1 May 1966
- Decommissioned: 21 June 1972
- Fate: Transferred to U.S. Navy 21 June 1972

South Vietnam
- Name: RVNS Lý Thường Kiệt (HQ-16)
- Namesake: Lý Thường Kiệt (1019–1105), a Lý dynasty general famed for repelling a Chinese invasion in 1075
- Acquired: 21 June 1972
- Fate: Fled to Philippines on collapse of South Vietnam April 1975; Formally transferred to Republic of the Philippines 5 April 1976

Philippine
- Name: RPS Andrés Bonifacio (PF-7)
- Namesake: Andrés Bonifacio y de Castro (1863–1897), a Filipino revolutionary leader, regarded as the "Father of the Philippine Revolution" and one of the most influential national heroes of the Philippines
- Acquired: 5 April 1976
- Commissioned: 27 July 1976
- Renamed: BRP Andrés Bonifacio (PF-7) June 1980
- Decommissioned: 1985?
- Fate: Sold for scrapping 2003

General characteristics (seaplane tender)
- Class & type: Barnegat-class seaplane tender
- Displacement: 1,766 tons (light; 2,592 tons (trial)
- Length: 310 ft 9 in (94.72 m)
- Beam: 41 ft 2 in (12.55 m)
- Draft: 13 ft 6 in (4.11 m) (lim.)
- Installed power: 6,000 horsepower (4.48 megawatts)
- Propulsion: Diesel engines, two shafts
- Speed: 18.2 knots (33.7 km/h)s
- Complement: 215 (ship's company); 367 (including aviation unit)
- Sensors & processing systems: Radar; sonar
- Armament: 3 × 5 in (130 mm) guns; 8 × 40 mm guns; 8 × 20 mm guns; 2 × depth charge tracks
- Aviation facilities: Supplies, spare parts, repairs, and berthing for one seaplane squadron; 80,000 US gallons (300,000 L) aviation fuel

General characteristics (Coast Guard cutter)
- Class & type: Casco-class cutter
- Displacement: 2,497 tons (full load) in 1965
- Length: 310 ft 9.5 in (94.729 m) overall; 300 ft 0 in (91.44 m) between perpendiculars
- Beam: 41 ft 0 in (12.50 m) maximum
- Draft: 12 ft 5 in (3.78 m) (full load) in 1965
- Installed power: 6,400 bhp (4,800 kW)
- Propulsion: Fairbanks-Morse direct-reversing diesel engines, two shafts; 166,430 US gallons (630,000 L) of fuel
- Speed: 17.0 knots (31.5 km/h) (maximum sustained in 1965); 11.5 knots (21.3 km/h) (economic in 1965)
- Range: 10,000 nautical miles (19,000 km) at 17.0 knots (31.5 km/h) in 1965; 15,000 nautical miles (28,000 km) at 11.5 knots (21.3 km/h) in 1965
- Complement: 149 (10 officers, 3 warrant officers, 136 enlisted personnel)
- Sensors & processing systems: Radars in 1965 (one each): AN-SPS-23, AN-SPS-29D; Sonar in 1965: AN-SQS-1
- Armament: In 1965: one single 5-inch (127 mm) 38-caliber Mark 12 Mod 1, 1 x Mark 52 Mod 3 director, 1 x Mark 26 fire-control radar, 1 x Mark 11 antisubmarine projector, 2 x Mark 32 Mod 2 torpedo tubes

General characteristics (South Vietnamese frigate)
- Class & type: Trần Quang Khải-class frigate
- Displacement: 1,766 tons (standard); 2,800 tons (full load)
- Length: 310 ft 9 in (94.72 m) (overall); 300 ft 0 in (91.44 m) waterline
- Beam: 41 ft 1 in (12.52 m)
- Draft: 13 ft 5 in (4.09 m)
- Installed power: 6,080 horsepower (4.54 megawatts)
- Propulsion: 2 x Fairbanks Morse 38D diesel engines
- Speed: approximately 18 knots (maximum)
- Complement: approximately 200
- Armament: 1 × 5-inch/38-caliber (127-millimeter) dual-purpose gun; 1 or 2 x 81-millimeter mortars in some ships; Several machine guns

General characteristics (Philippine Navy frigate)
- Class & type: Andrés Bonifacio-class frigate
- Displacement: 1,766 tons (standard); 2,800 tons (full load)
- Length: 311.65 ft (94.99 m)
- Beam: 41.18 ft (12.55 m)
- Draft: 13.66 ft (4.16 m)
- Installed power: 6,200 brake horsepower (4.63 megawatts)
- Propulsion: 2 × Fairbanks-Morse 38D8 1/8 diesel engines
- Speed: 18.2 knots (33.7 km/h) (maximum)
- Range: 8,000 nautical miles (15,000 km) at 15.6 knots (28.9 km/h)
- Sensors & processing systems: Sperry AN/SPS-53 Surface Search Radar; Westinghouse AN/SPS-29D Air Search Radar; Mk.26 Mod.1 Fire Control System; Mk.52 Mod.3 Gun Director
- Armament: 1 × Mk.12 5-inch/38-caliber (127 mm) dual-purpose gun; 2 × Mk.1 Twin Bofors 40 mm L/60 AA guns; 2 × Single Bofors 40 mm L/60 AA guns; 4 × Twin Oerlikon 20 mm cannon; 4 × M2 Browning .50-caliber (12.7-mm) general-purpose machine guns; 2 × 81 mm Mortars
- Aircraft carried: None permanently assigned; helipad could accommodate one MBB Bo 105 Helicopter
- Aviation facilities: Helipad; no support capability

USS Chincoteague (AVP-24) was a United States Navy seaplane tender in commission from 1943 to 1946 that saw service in the Pacific during World War II. After the war, she was in commission in the United States Coast Guard as the cutter USCGC Chincoteague (WAVP-375), later WHEC-375, from 1949 to 1972. She was transferred to South Vietnam in 1972 and was commissioned into service with the Republic of Vietnam Navy as the frigate RVNS Lý Thường Kiệt (HQ-16), seeing combat in the Battle of the Paracel Islands in 1974. When South Vietnam collapsed at the conclusion of the Vietnam War in 1975, she fled to the Philippines, where she was commissioned into the Philippine Navy, serving as the frigate RPS (later BRP) Andrés Bonifacio (PF-7) from 1976 to 1985.

== Construction and commissioning ==
Chincoteague was launched on 15 April 1942 by Lake Washington Shipyard at Houghton, Washington, sponsored by Mrs. Doris Winden Rowe. She was commissioned on 12 April 1943.

== United States Navy service ==
=== World War II ===
==== New Guinea campaign ====
Chincoteague departed San Diego, California, on 13 June 1943 for Saboe Bay in the Santa Cruz Islands, where she arrived on 6 July 1943 to support the New Guinea campaign as tender for Fleet Air Wing 1 (FAW-1). On 16 July 1943 the Japanese launched eight air attacks at Saboe Bay, killing nine of Chincoteague's crew and damaging the ship badly with one direct bomb hit and two near misses. Taken in tow first by the seaplane tender USS Thornton (AVD-11) and then by the tug USS Sonoma (AT-12), Chincoteague reached Espiritu Santo on 21 July 1943 for emergency repairs, and later was towed to San Francisco, California, for a thorough overhaul.

==== Central and Southwest Pacific operations ====
After completion of repairs, Chincoteague put out from San Diego on 27 January 1944 for Pearl Harbor, Hawaii, and operations in support of the consolidation of the northern Solomon Islands, the occupation of the Marshall Islands, and air action in the Treasury Islands. She tended seaplanes at Kwajalein, at Eniwetok, in the Treasury Islands, and at Green Island. In addition, she carried freight, mail, and passengers among the Solomon Islands, Marshall Islands, Gilbert Islands, Mariana Islands, New Hebrides, and Phoenix Islands, and voyaged from Guadalcanal to Auckland, New Zealand, returning with aircraft engines. Escorting a convoy, Chincoteague sailed from Eniwetok on 24 September 1944 for Pearl Harbor and an overhaul. She returned to active operations on 6 December 1944 at Kossol Roads in the Palau Islands, where she conducted salvage and rescue operations for the next two months.

==== Iwo Jima campaign and operations at Ulithi Atoll ====
Chincoteague arrived at Guam on 13 February 1945 to join the assault force bound for Iwo Jima, and on 20 February 1945, arrived off the bitterly contested island to tend seaplanes until 8 March 1945. Similar operations at Ulithi Atoll followed until 8 June 1945, when she sailed for an overhaul on the United States West Coast, where she was when World War II ended with the cessation of hostilities with Japan on 15 August 1945.

==== Honors and awards ====
Chincoteague received six battle stars for World War II service.

=== Post-World War II ===
On postwar occupation duty, Chincoteague sailed to the East Asia to care for seaplanes at Okinawa and Qingdao, China, between 18 October 1945 and 16 March 1946. She then sailed for San Diego; New Orleans, Louisiana; and Beaumont, Texas.

=== Decommissioning ===
On 21 December 1946, Chincoteague was decommissioned and placed in reserve.

== United States Coast Guard service ==
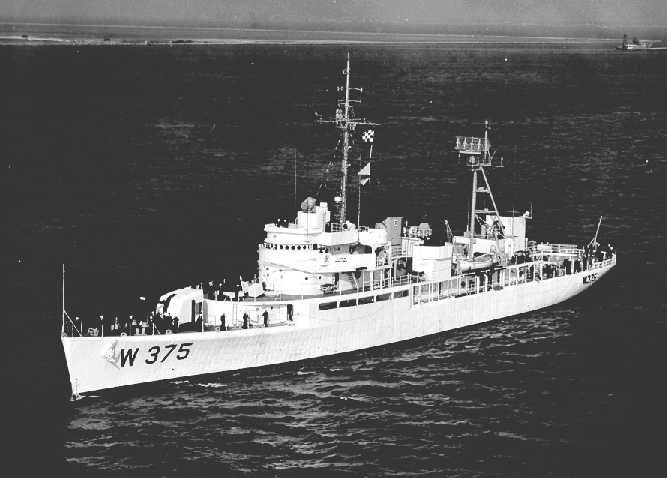
USCGC Chincoteague (WAVP-375) in 1964, before the Coast Guard's adoption of the "racing stripe" markings on its ships.

Barnegat-class ships were very reliable and seaworthy and had good habitability, and the Coast Guard viewed them as ideal for ocean station duty, in which they would perform weather reporting and search and rescue tasks, once they were modified by having a balloon shelter added aft and having oceanographic equipment, an oceanographic winch, and a hydrographic winch installed. After World War II, the U.S. Navy transferred 18 of the ships to the Coast Guard, in which they were known as the Casco-class cutters.

The Navy loaned Chincoteague to the United States Coast Guard on 7 March 1949. The Coast Guard commissioned her as USCGC Chincoteague (WAVP-375) the same day.

=== Service history ===
Chincoteague was home-ported in Norfolk, Virginia, throughout her Coast Guard career. Her primary duty was to serve on ocean stations in the North Atlantic Ocean to gather meteorological data. While on duty in one of these stations, she was required to patrol a 210-square-mile (544-square-kilometer) area for three weeks at a time, leaving the area only when physically relieved by another Coast Guard cutter or in the case of a dire emergency. While on station, she acted as an aircraft check point at the point of no return, a relay point for messages from ships and aircraft, as a source of the latest weather information for passing aircraft, as a floating oceanographic laboratory, and as a search-and-rescue ship for downed aircraft and vessels in distress, and she engaged in law enforcement operations.

In December 1955, Chincoteague took the disabled merchant ship Canadian Observer under tow to keep her from going aground off the south coast of Newfoundland in Canada.

On 30 October 1956, Chincoteague rescued 33 crewmen from the West German merchant ship Helga Bolten in the North Atlantic by using two inflatable lifeboats during heavy seas. She then stood by distressed vessels for seven days until they could be towed to the Azores by commercial tug.

On 1 May 1966, Chincoteague was reclassified as a high endurance cutter and redesignated WHEC-375. On 26 September 1966 her long-term loan from the Navy to the Coast Guard came to an end when the Navy transferred her outright to the Coast Guard.

Chincoteague took the disabled merchant ship Kenyon Victory under tow 30 nautical miles (56 km) south of San Salvador Island in the Bahamas on 5 October 1969 until relieved of the tow by a commercial tug.

=== Decommissioning and transfer to South Vietnam ===
In April 1972, Chincoteague and two of her sister ships, the Coast Guard cutters USCGC Absecon and USCGC McCulloch, were deployed as Coast Guard Squadron Two, with crews composed mainly of members of the United States Coast Guard Reserve. They were originally scheduled to sail to Subic Bay in the Philippine Islands, but were diverted to the U.S. Navy base at Apra Harbor, Guam. Eventually the three cutters had their antisubmarine warfare equipment removed and were decommissioned, transferred to the U.S. Navy, and then transferred to South Vietnam. For Chincoteague, all three of these events occurred on 21 June 1972.

== Republic of Vietnam Navy service ==
After Chincoteague was transferred to South Vietnam, she was commissioned in the Republic of Vietnam Navy as the frigate RVNS Lý Thường Kiệt. (Note: An alternative spelling encountered widely among this article's sources is Ly Thoung Kiet.) (HQ-16) (Note: Per Janes's Fighting Ships 1973–1974, p. 592, "HQ" is an abbreviation for "Hai Quan," Vietnamese for "Navy", used for all Republic of Vietnam Navy ships.) (Note: This article assumes that the authoritative Jane's Fighting Ships 1973–1974, p. 592, is correct about the ship's lineage (i.e., that she was the former USS Chincoteague (AVP-24) and USCGC Chincoteague (WAVP-375/WHEC-375) and was designated HQ-16 in South Vietnamese service. However, extensive confusion exists on these points in print and on the Web. The Naval Historical Center Online Library of Selected Images entry for Chincoteague (see http://www.history.navy.mil/photos/sh-usn/usnsh-c/avp24.htm) and the United States Coast Guard Historian's Office (see http://www.uscg.mil/history/webcutters/Chincoteague1949.asp) both agree that Lý Thường Kiệt was the former Chincoteague, but neither site mentions her South Vietnamese "HQ" designation. NavSource in its entry on Chincoteague (see http://www.navsource.net/archives/09/43/4324.htm) states in the ship's history that Chincoteague instead became the South Vietnamese ship RVNS Trần Bình Trọng (HQ-05), but in photo captions posted below that in the Chincoteague entry states that Chincoteague became both Lý Thường Kiệt (HQ-16) and Trần Bình Trọng (HQ-05). (Meanwhile, NavSource's entry for USS Castle Rock (AVP-35) and USCGC Castle Rock (WAVP-383/WHEC-383) (see http://www.navsource.net/archives/09/43/4335.htm) states that it was also Castle Rock that became Trần Bình Trọng (HQ-05)). Conway's All the World's Fighting Ships 1947–1982 Part II: The Warsaw Pact and Non-Aligned Nations, p. 369, agrees with Jane's that Lý Thường Kiệt was the former Chincoteague, but also states that Lý Thường Kiệt's designation in South Vietnamese service was HQ-05, a designation that Jane's, p. 592, and NavSource (in both its Chincoteague and Castle Rock entries) state was the designation for Trần Bình Trọng. To complete the confusion, the Inventory of VNN's Battle Ships Part 1 (see Part 1 at http://www.vnafmamn.com/VNNavy_inventory.html) claims that Chincoteague became Trần Bình Trọng (HQ-05) and in its Part 2 (see Part 2 at http://www.vnafmamn.com/VNNavy_inventory2.html) contradicts all the other sources by stating that it was yet another ship, USS Bering Strait (AVP-34)/USCGC Bering Strait (WAVP-382/WHEC-382), that became Lý Thường Kiệt (HQ-16). The Dictionary of American Naval Fighting Ships entry for Chincoteague (see http://www.history.navy.mil/danfs/c8/chincoteague.htm) apparently was written before the ship was transferred to South Vietnam and has not been updated, and therefore makes no mention at all of her South Vietnamese service.) She was among seven Barnegat- and Casco-class ships transferred to South Vietnam in 1971 and 1972. Known in the Republic of Vietnam Navy as the Trần Quang Khải-class frigates, they were the largest warships in the South Vietnamese inventory, and their 5-inch (127-millimeter) guns were South Vietnam's largest naval guns.

=== Service history ===
Lý Thường Kiệt and her sisters fought alongside U.S. Navy ships during the final years of the Vietnam War, patrolling the South Vietnamese coast and providing gunfire support to South Vietnamese forces ashore.

==== The Battle of the Paracel Islands ====
Possession of the Paracel Islands had long been disputed between South Vietnam and the People's Republic of China. With South Vietnamese forces stationed on the islands drawing down because they were needed on the Vietnamese mainland in the war with North Vietnam, China took advantage of the situation to send forces to seize the islands.

On 16 January 1974, Lý Thường Kiệt spotted Chinese forces ashore on the islands. She and the Chinese ordered one another to withdraw, and neither side did. Reinforcements arrived for both sides over the next three days, including Lý Thường Kiệt's sister ship Trần Bình Trọng, which appeared on the scene on 18 January 1974 with the commander of the Republic of Vietnam Navy, Captain Hà Văn Ngạc, aboard.

By the morning of 19 January 1974, the Chinese had four corvettes and two submarine chasers at the Paracels, while the South Vietnamese had Lý Thường Kiệt, Trần Bình Trọng, the frigate RVNS Trần Khánh Dư (HQ-04), and the corvette RVNS Nhật Tảo (HQ-10) on the scene. Trần Bình Trọng landed South Vietnamese troops on Duncan Island (or Quang Hoa in Vietnamese), and they were driven off by Chinese gunfire. The South Vietnamese ships opened fire on the Chinese ships at 10:24 hours, and the 40-minute Battle of the Paracel Islands ensued. Nhật Tảo was sunk, and the other three South Vietnamese ships all suffered damage, Lý Thường Kiệt being one of the most heavily damaged ships; Chinese losses were more difficult to ascertain, but certainly most or all of the Chinese ships suffered damage and one or two may have sunk. Not equipped or trained for open-ocean combat and outgunned, the South Vietnamese ships were forced to withdraw.

The Chinese seized the islands the next day, and they have remained under the control of the People's Republic of China ever since.

==== Flight to the Philippines ====
When South Vietnam collapsed at the end of the Vietnam War in late April 1975, Lý Thường Kiệt became a ship without a country. She fled to Subic Bay in the Philippines, packed with South Vietnamese refugees. On 22 and 23 May 1975, a U.S. Coast Guard team inspected Lý Thường Kiệt and five of her sister ships, which also had fled to the Philippines in April 1975. One of the inspectors noted: "These vessels brought in several hundred refugees and are generally rat-infested. They are in a filthy, deplorable condition. Below decks generally would compare with a garbage scow."

After Lý Thường Kiệt had been cleaned and repaired, the United States formally transferred her to the Philippines on 5 April 1976.

== Philippine Navy service ==
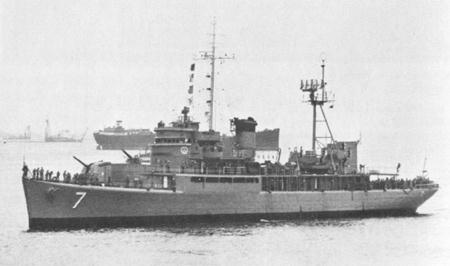
Andrés Bonifacio (PF-7) in Manila Bay.

The former Lý Thường Kiệt was commissioned into the Philippine Navy as the frigate RPS Andrés Bonifacio (PF-7). (Note: This article assumes that the authoritative Jane's Fighting Ships 1980–1981, p. 370, is correct about the ship's lineage (i.e., that she was the former USS Chincoteague (AVP-24), USCGC Chincoteague (WAVP-375/WHEC-375), and RVNS Lý Thường Kiệt (HQ-16). However, extensive confusion exists on these points in print and on the Web. The Naval Historical Center Online Library of Selected Images entry for Chincoteague (see http://www.history.navy.mil/photos/sh-usn/usnsh-c/avp24.htm), the United States Coast Guard Historian's Office (see http://www.uscg.mil/history/webcutters/Chincoteague1949.asp), and Conway's All the World's Fighting Ships 1947–1982 Part II: The Warsaw Pact and Non-Aligned Nations, p. 356, all agree with Jane's that Andrés Bonifacio was the former Lý Thường Kiệt and Chincoteague. However, NavSource in its entry on Chincoteague (see http://www.navsource.net/archives/09/43/4324.htm) states in the ship's history that Chincoteague instead became the South Vietnamese ship RVNS Trần Bình Trọng (HQ-05) and that Trần Bình Trọng became Andrés Bonifacio, although in photo captions posted below that in the Chincoteague entry it also states that Chincoteague became both Lý Thường Kiệt (HQ-16) and Trần Bình Trọng (HQ-05), raising the possibility that either Trần Bình Trọng or Lý Thường Kiệt became Andrés Bonifacio. (Meanwhile, NavSource's entry for USS Castle Rock (AVP-35) and USCGC Castle Rock (WAVP-383/WHEC-383) (see http://www.navsource.net/archives/09/43/4335.htm) states that Trần Bình Trọng (HQ-05) instead became the Philippine Navy frigate BRP Francisco Dagohoy (PF-10)). Adding to the confusion, the Inventory of VNN's Battle Ships Part 1 (see Part 1 at http://www.vnafmamn.com/VNNavy_inventory.html) claims that Trần Bình Trọng became Andrés Bonifacio and in its Part 2 (see Part 2 at http://www.vnafmamn.com/VNNavy_inventory2.html) contradicts all the other sources by stating that Lý Thường Kiệt became yet another Philippine Navy ship, BRP Diego Silang (PF-9). The Dictionary of American Naval Fighting Ships in its entry for USS Bering Strait (AVP-34) (see ) states that Diego Silang was the former Trần Bình Trọng.) In June 1980 her prefix was changed from "RPS" to "BRP", and was renamed BRP Andrés Bonifacio (PF-7). She and three other former Barnegat- and Casco-class ships were the largest Philippine Navy ships of their time and were known in the Philippine Navy as the Andrés Bonifacio-class frigates.

=== Modernization ===
The Andrés Bonifacio-class frigates were passed to the Philippine Navy with fewer weapons aboard than they had had during their U.S. Navy and U.S. Coast Guard careers and with old surface search radars installed. The Philippine Navy addressed these shortfalls through modernization programs. In Philippine service, Andrés Bonifacio retained her South Vietnamese armament, consisting of a single Mark 12 5"/38 caliber (127-mm) gun, a dual-purpose weapon capable of anti-surface and anti-air fire, mounted in a Mark 30 Mod 0 enclosed base ring with a range of up to 18,200 yards (16,600 m) yards; two twin Mark 1 Bofors 40mm anti-aircraft gun mounts, four Mk. 4 single 20-millimeter Oerlikon anti-aircraft gun mounts, four M2 Browning .50-caliber (12.7-millimeter) general-purpose machine guns, and two 81-mm mortars. However, in 1979 Hatch and Kirk, Inc., added a helicopter deck aft which could accommodate a Philippine Navy MBB Bo 105C helicopter for utility, scouting, and maritime patrol purposes, although the ship had no capability to refuel or otherwise support visiting helicopters. The Sperry SPS-53 surface search and navigation radar also was installed, replacing the AN/SPS-23 radar, although the ship retained both its AN/SPS-29D air search radar and its Mark 26 Mod 1 Fire Control Radar System. The Philippine Navy made plans to equip Andrés Bonifacio and her sister ships with new radar systems and long-range BGM-84 Harpoon anti-ship cruise missiles, but this upgrade did not materialize due to the worsening political and economic crisis in the Philippines in the mid-1980s.

=== Service history ===
After nine years of active service, Andrés Bonifacio reportedly was decommissioned in June 1985, although she was still listed as "active" as of July 1993. She became well known as the ship in which renegade Colonel Gregorio "Gringo" Honasan, leader of a nearly successful coup against the Corazon Aquino government, was detained after his capture in December 1987. Together with his 13-man guard escort, he escaped on 2 April 1988.

The Philippine Navy made plans to reactivate Andrés Bonifacio as an auxiliary fleet flagship in 1995, but this never took place due to a lack of funds. She eventually sank at her berthing area in Fort San Felipe, part of the Sangley Point Naval Base at Cavite City on Luzon.

=== Disposal ===
Andrés Bonifacio was refloated and ultimately sold for scrapping in 2003. Her hulk's sale helped the Philippine Navy to finance an upgrade program for its three Jacinto class corvettes.
