= Castle Rock (Alaska) =

Coordinates: 55°16′45″N 159°29′58″W

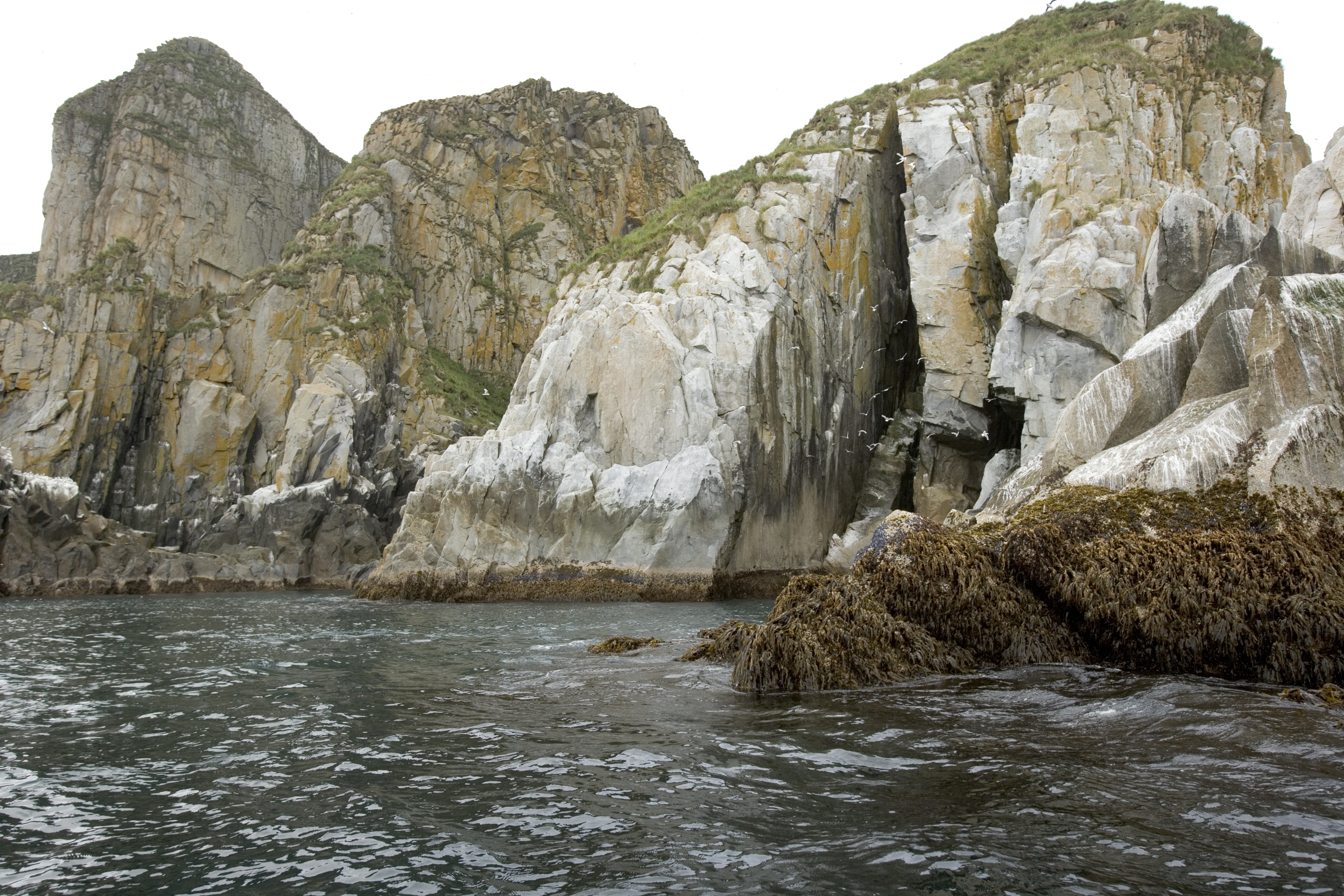
View of Castle Rock.

Castle Rock is an island in Alaska in the United States. It is one of the Shumagin Islands. Castle Rock is in Aleutians East Borough, and is located off the south coast of the Alaska Peninsula at 55.27917° North Latitude 159.49944° West Longitude. A Barnegat-class seaplane tender, the USS Castle Rock (AVP-35), was named for the island.
