= USS Castle Rock =

Tender of the United States Navy

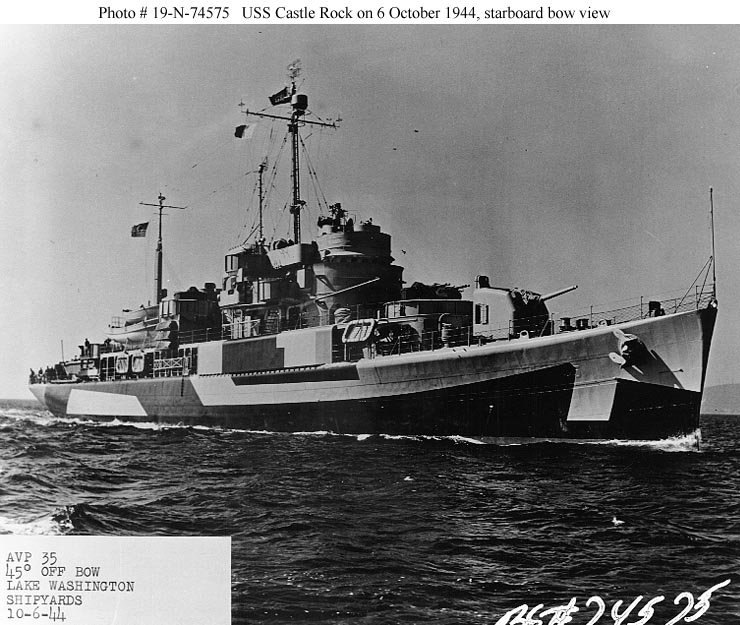
- USS Castle Rock (AVP-35) off Houghton, Washington, on 6 October 1944, two days before commissioning.

History

United States
- Name: USS Castle Rock (AVP-35)
- Namesake: Castle Rock, an island in Alaska
- Builder: Lake Washington Shipyard, Houghton, Washington
- Laid down: 12 July 1943
- Launched: 11 March 1944
- Sponsored by: Mrs. R. W. Cooper
- Commissioned: 8 October 1944
- Decommissioned: 6 August 1946
- Fate: Loaned to United States Coast Guard 16 September 1948; Permanently transferred to Coast Guard 26 September 1966

United States
- Name: USCGC Castle Rock (WAVP-383)
- Namesake: Previous name retained
- Acquired: Loaned by U.S. Navy to U.S. Coast Guard 16 September 1948; Transferred permanently from U.S. Navy to U.S. Coast Guard 26 September 1966
- Commissioned: 18 December 1948
- Reclassified: High endurance cutter, WHEC-383, 1 May 1966
- Decommissioned: 21 December 1971
- Honors and awards: Two campaign stars for Vietnam War service
- Fate: Transferred to South Vietnam 21 December 1971

South Vietnam
- Name: RVNS Trần Bình Trọng (HQ-05)
- Namesake: Trần Bình Trọng (1259–1285), a Trần dynasty general and prince famed for helping to repel Mongol invasions, and for choosing to be executed rather than defect.
- Acquired: 21 December 1971
- Fate: Fled to Philippines on collapse of South Vietnam April 1975; Formally transferred to Republic of the Philippines 5 April 1976

Philippines
- Name: RPS Francisco Dagohoy (PF-10)
- Namesake: Filipino revolutionary Francisco Dagohoy (fl. 1700s)
- Acquired: 5 April 1976
- Commissioned: 23 June 1979
- Renamed: BRP Francisco Dagohoy (PF-10) July 1980
- Decommissioned: June 1985
- Fate: Discarded March 1993; probably scrapped

General characteristics (seaplane tender)
- Class & type: Barnegat-class small seaplane tender
- Displacement: 1,766 tons (light); 2,592 tons (trial)
- Length: 310 ft 9 in (94.72 m)
- Beam: 41 ft 2 in (12.55 m)
- Draft: 13 ft 6 in (4.11 m) (lim.)
- Installed power: 6,000 horsepower (4.48 megawatts)
- Propulsion: Diesel engines, two shafts
- Speed: 18.2 knots (33.7 km/h)s
- Complement: 215 (ship's company); 367 (including aviation unit)
- Sensors & processing systems: Radar; sonar
- Armament: 1 × 5 in (130 mm) gun; 1 × quadruple 40-mm antiaircraft gun mount; 2 × twin 40-mm gun mounts; 6 × 20-mm antiaircraft guns; 2 × depth charge tracks
- Aviation facilities: Supplies, spare parts, repairs, and berthing for one seaplane squadron; 80,000 US gallons (300,000 L) aviation fuel

General characteristics (Coast Guard cutter)
- Class & type: Casco-class cutter
- Displacement: 2,529 tons (full load) in 1966
- Length: 310 ft 9 in (94.72 m) overall; 300 ft 0 in (91.44 m) between perpendiculars
- Beam: 41 ft 2.375 in (12.55713 m) maximum
- Draft: 13 ft 8 in (4.17 m) maximum in 1966
- Installed power: 6,400 bhp (4,800 kW)
- Propulsion: Fairbanks-Morse direct-reversing diesel engines, two shafts; 166,430 US gallons (630,000 L) of fuel
- Speed: 18.2 knots (33.7 km/h) (maximum sustained) in 1966; 10.0 knots (18.5 km/h) (economic) in 1966
- Range: 8,000 nautical miles (15,000 km) at 18.2 knots (33.7 km/h) in 1966; 18,050 nautical miles (33,430 km) at 10.0 knots (18.5 km/h) in 1966
- Complement: In 1966: 151 (10 officers, 3 warrant officers, 138 enlisted personnel)
- Sensors & processing systems: Radars in 1966 (one each): SPS-51, SPS-29; Sonar in 1966: SQS-1
- Armament: In 1966: 1 x single 5-inch (127 mm) 38-caliber Mod D gun mount; Mark 52 Mod 3 director; Mark 26 Mod 4 fire control radar; 2 × 81-millimter mortars; 2 × .50-caliber (12.7-millimeter machine guns; 1 × Mark 10-1 antisubmarine projector; 2 x Mark 32 Mod 5 torpedo launchers

General characteristics (South Vietnamese frigate)
- Class & type: Trần Quang Khải-class frigate
- Displacement: 1,766 tons (standard); 2,800 tons (full load)
- Length: 310 ft 9 in (94.72 m) (overall); 300 ft 0 in (91.44 m) waterline
- Beam: 41 ft 1 in (12.52 m)
- Draft: 13 ft 5 in (4.09 m)
- Installed power: 6,080 horsepower (4.54 megawatts)
- Propulsion: 2 x Fairbanks Morse 38D diesel engines
- Speed: approximately 18 knots (maximum)
- Complement: approximately 200
- Armament: 1 × 5-inch/38-caliber (127-millimeter) dual-purpose gun; 1 or 2 x 81-millimeter mortars in some ships; Several machine guns

General characteristics (Philippine Navy frigate)
- Class & type: Andrés Bonifacio-class frigate
- Displacement: 1,766 tons standard, 2,800 tons full load
- Length: 311.65 ft (94.99 m)
- Beam: 41.18 ft (12.55 m)
- Draft: 13.66 ft (4.16 m)
- Installed power: 6,200 brake horsepower (4.63 megawatts)
- Propulsion: 2 × Fairbanks Morse 38D8 1/8 diesel engines
- Speed: 18.2 knots (33.7 km/h) (maximum)
- Range: 8,000 nautical miles (15,000 km) at 15.6 knots (28.9 km/h)
- Complement: About 200
- Sensors & processing systems: Sperry SPS-53 Surface Search Radar; Westinghouse AN/SPS-29D Air Search Radar; Mk.26 Mod.1 Fire Control System; Mk.52 Mod.3 Gun Director
- Armament: 1 × Mk.12 5-inch/38-caliber (127 mm) dual-purpose gun; 2 × Mk.1 Twin Bofors L/60 40 mm AA guns; 2 × Mk.3 Single Bofors L/60 40 mm AA guns; 4 × Twin Oerlikon 20 mm cannon; 4 × M2 Browning .50-caliber (12.7-mm) general-purpose machine guns; 2 × 81 mm Mortars
- Aircraft carried: None permanently assigned; helipad could accommodate one MBB Bo 105 Helicopter
- Aviation facilities: Helipad; no support facilities aboard

USS Castle Rock (AVP-35) was a United States Navy Barnegat-class small seaplane tender in commission from 1944 to 1946 which saw service in the late months of World War II. After the war, she was in commission in the United States Coast Guard as the Coast Guard cutter USCGC Castle Rock (WAVP-383), later WHEC-383, from 1948 to 1971, seeing service in the Vietnam War during her Coast Guard career. Transferred to South Vietnam in 1971, she served in the Republic of Vietnam Navy as the frigate RVNS Trần Bình Trọng (HQ-05) and fought in the Battle of the Paracel Islands in 1974. When South Vietnam collapsed at the end of the Vietnam War in 1975, Trần Bình Trọng fled to the Philippines, where she served in the Philippine Navy from 1979 to 1985 as the frigate RPS (later BRP) Francisco Dagohoy (PF-10).

== Construction and commissioning ==
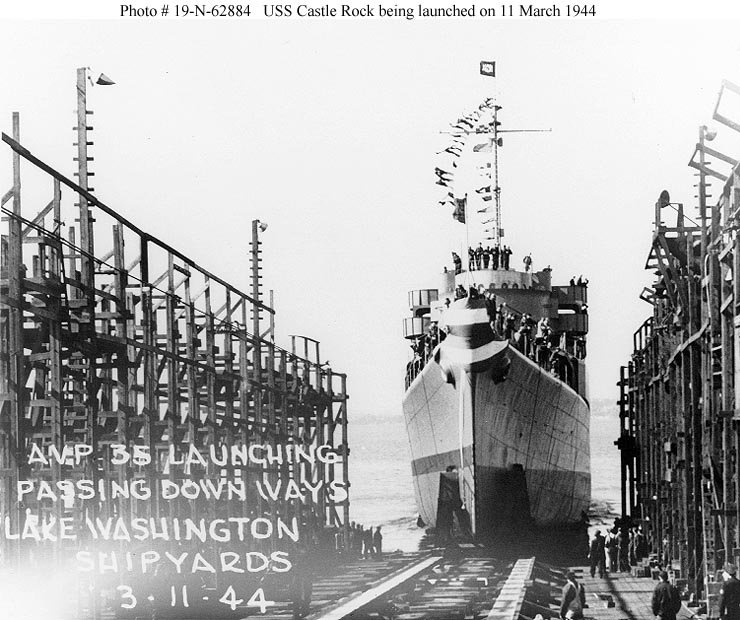
USS Castle Rock (AVP-35) is launched on 11 March 1944 at Lake Washington Shipyard, Houghton, Washington.

Castle Rock was laid down on 12 July 1943 at Houghton, Washington, by the Lake Washington Shipyard, and was launched on 11 March 1944, sponsored by Mrs. R. W. Cooper. She commissioned on 8 October 1944.

== U.S. Navy service ==
=== World War II ===
Castle Rock stood out of San Diego, California, on 18 December 1944 bound for Pearl Harbor, Hawaii, and Eniwetok, where she arrived on 28 January 1945. Assigned to escort convoys between Saipan, Guam, and Ulithi Atoll until 20 March 1945, Castle Rock then took up duties of tending seaplanes at Saipan. Her seaplanes carried out varied air operations, including reconnaissance, search, and antisubmarine warfare activities, while Castle Rock herself also performed local escort duties.

=== Post-World War II ===
On 28 November 1945, Castle Rock sailed from Saipan for Guam, where she embarked a group assigned to study Japanese defenses on Chichi Jima and Truk. This continued until 5 January 1946, when Castle Rock returned to seaplane tender operations at Saipan.

Castle Rock left Saipan on 9 March 1946, arriving at San Francisco, California, on 27 March 1946. She was decommissioned there on 6 August 1946

== United States Coast Guard service ==
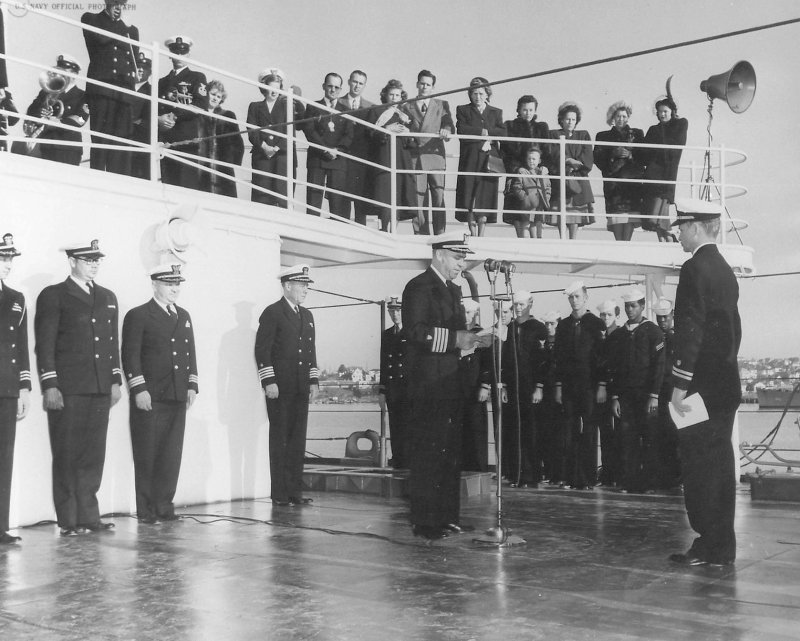
The commissioning ceremony for USCGC Castle Rock (WAVP-383) on 18 December 1948 at Mare Island Naval Shipyard, Vallejo, California.

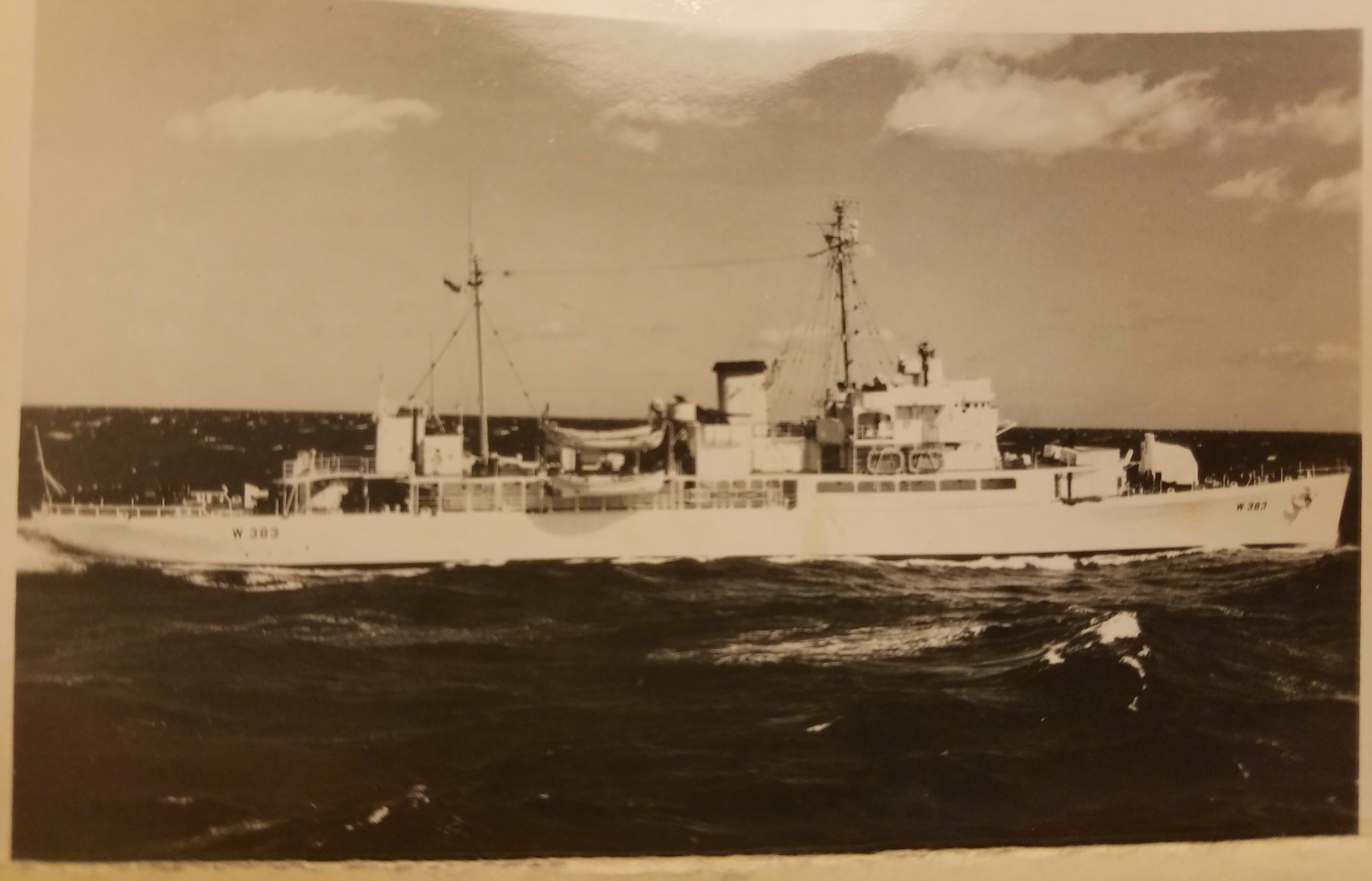
USCGC Castle Rock sometime before the U.S. Coast Guard's 1967 adoption of the "racing stripe" markings on its ships.

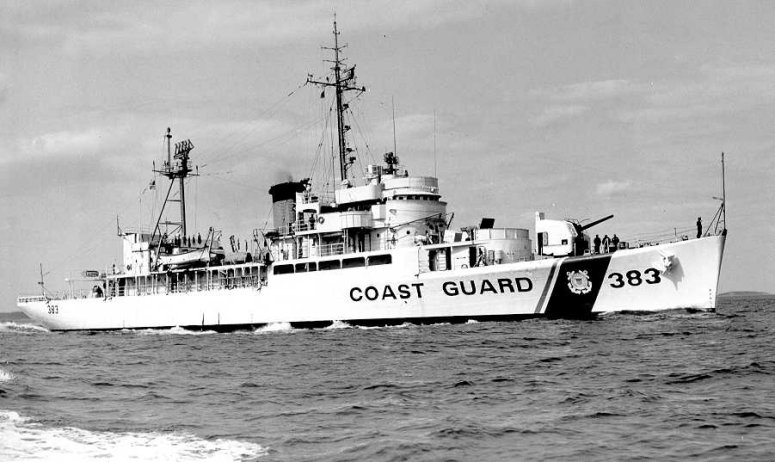
USCGC Castle Rock (WHEC-383) on 1 May 1969.

Barnegat-class ships were very reliable and seaworthy and had good habitability, and the Coast Guard viewed them as ideal for ocean station duty, in which they would perform weather reporting and search and rescue tasks, once they were modified by having a balloon shelter added aft and having oceanographic equipment, an oceanographic winch, and a hydrographic winch installed. After World War II, the U.S. Navy transferred 18 of the ships to the Coast Guard, in which they were known as the Casco-class cutters.

The U.S. Navy loaned Castle Rock to the Coast Guard on 16 September 1948. After undergoing conversion for use as a weather-reporting ship, she was commissioned into Coast Guard service as USCGC Castle Rock (WAVP-383) on 18 December 1948 at Mare Island Navy Yard, Vallejo, California.

=== North Atlantic and Caribbean ===
Castle Rock was stationed at Boston, Massachusetts, after her commissioning. Her primary duty was to serve on ocean stations in the Atlantic Ocean to gather meteorological data. While on duty in one of these stations, she was required to patrol a 210-square-mile (544-square-kilometer) area for three weeks at a time, leaving the area only when physically relieved by another Coast Guard cutter or in the case of a dire emergency. While on station, she acted as an aircraft check point at the point of no return, a relay point for messages from ships and aircraft, as a source of the latest weather information for passing aircraft, as a floating oceanographic laboratory, and as a search-and-rescue ship for downed aircraft and vessels in distress, and she engaged in law enforcement operations.

In March 1956, Castle Rock towed the Finnish merchant ship Sunnavik from 300 nautical miles (560 km) south of Halifax, Nova Scotia, Canada, to safety.

Castle Rock reported to Guantanamo Bay, Cuba, for service during the blockade of Cuba during the Cuban Missile Crisis in 1962.

Castle Rock took part in the United States Coast Guard Academy cadet cruise in May 1961, May 1963 and again in August 1965. These cadet cruises were in company with the Coast Guard Training (barque) sailing ship, the CGC Eagle and at least one other Coast Guard cutter.

On 1 May 1966, Castle Rock was reclassified as a high endurance cutter and redesignated WHEC-383. On 26 September 1966 her period on loan to the Coast Guard ended when she was stricken from the Naval Vessel Register and transferred permanently to the Coast Guard.

Castle Rock was stationed at Portland, Maine, beginning in 1967, with the same duties she had as during her years at Boston. On 22 and 23 February 1967 she rescued eight people from the sinking fishing vessel Maureen and Michael 90 nautical miles (170 km) southwest of Cape Race, Newfoundland, Canada.

=== Vietnam War service ===
Castle Rock was assigned to Coast Guard Squadron Three in South Vietnam in 1971. While on an R & R visit from South Vietnam, she suffered an engineering casualty and sank at her pier in Singapore, but returned to duty with the squadron upon completion of repairs. Castle Rock arrived in Vietnam on 30 July 1971. Coast Guard Squadron Three was tasked to operate in conjunction with U.S. Navy forces in Operation Market Time, the interdiction of North Vietnamese arms and munitions traffic along the coastline of South Vietnam during the Vietnam War. The squadron's other Vietnam War duties included fire support for ground forces, resupplying Coast Guard and Navy patrol boats, and search-and-rescue operations. Castle Rock served in this capacity until 21 December 1971.

==== Honors and awards ====
Castle Rock was awarded two campaign stars for her Vietnam War service, for:

- Consolidation I 9 July 1971 – 30 November 1971
- Consolidation II 1 December 1971 – 21 December 1971

=== Decommissioning ===
After her antisubmarine warfare equipment had been removed, the Coast Guard decommissioned Castle Rock in South Vietnam on 21 December 1971, the day her Vietnam War tour ended.

== Republic of Vietnam Navy service ==
RVNS Trần Bình Trọng (HQ-05) pierside at right, with her sister ships RVNS Trần Quốc Toản (HQ-06) (center) and RVNS Trần Quang Khải (HQ-02) (left).

On 21 December 1971, Castle Rock was transferred to South Vietnam, which commissioned her into the Republic of Vietnam Navy as the frigate RVNS Trần Bình Trọng. (Note: Alternative spellings encountered include Tran Vinh Trong (see Naval Historical Center Online Library of Selected Images at http://www.history.navy.mil/photos/sh-usn/usnsh-c/avp35.htm)) (HQ-05) (Note: Per Janes's Fighting Ships 1973-1974, p. 592, "HQ" is an abbreviation for "Hai Quan", Vietnamese for "Navy", used for all Republic of Vietnam Navy ships.) (Note: This article assumes that the authoritative Jane's Fighting Ships 1973-1974, p. 592, is correct about the ship's lineage (i.e., that she was the former USS Castle Rock (AVP-35) and USCGC Castle Rock (WAVP-383/WHEC-383) and was designated HQ-05 in South Vietnamese service. However, extensive confusion exists on these points in print and on the Web. The United States Coast Guard Historian's Office (see http://www.uscg.mil/history/webcutters/CastleRock1948.asp) agrees that Trần Bình Trọng was the former Castle Rock, but does not mention her South Vietnamese "HQ" designation. NavSource agrees with Jane's that Castle Rock became Trần Bình Trọng (HQ-05) in its entry on Castle Rock (see http://www.navsource.net/archives/09/43/4335.htm) but in its entry on USS Chincoteague (AVP-24) / USCGC Chincoteague (WAVP-375/WHEC-375) (see http://www.navsource.net/archives/09/43/4324.htm) also states that it was Chincoteague that became Trần Bình Trọng (HQ-05). Conway's All the World's Fighting Ships 1947-1982 Part II: The Warsaw Pact and Non-Aligned Nations, p. 369, agrees with Jane's and the NavSource Castle Rock entry that Trần Bình Trọng was the former Castle Rock, but disagrees with the other sources by citing Trần Bình Trọng's designation in South Vietnamese service as HQ-17, a designation that Jane's, p. 592, the Inventory of VNN's Battle Ships Part 2 (see Part 2 at http://www.vnafmamn.com/VNNavy_inventory2.html), and NavSource (see http://www.navsource.net/archives/09/43/4356.htm) all say was assigned to RVNS Ngô Quyền (HQ-17). To complete the confusion, the Inventory of VNN's Battle Ships Part 1 (see Part 1 at http://www.vnafmamn.com/VNNavy_inventory.html) claims that Trần Bình Trọng (HQ-05) was the former Chincoteague, agreeing with the NavSource Chincoteague entry but not with the other sources, and in its Part 2 (see Part 2 at http://www.vnafmamn.com/VNNavy_inventory2.html ) contradicts all the other sources in whole or in part by stating that Castle Rock became Ngô Quyền (HQ-17). The Dictionary of American Naval Fighting Ships entry for the ship (see http://www.history.navy.mil/danfs/c4/castle_rock.htm) apparently was written before the ship was transferred to South Vietnam and has not been updated, and therefore makes no mention at all of her South Vietnamese service.) was a South Vietnamese frigate of the Republic of Vietnam Navy in commission from 1971 to 1975. She and her six sister ships – all former Barnegat- and Casco-class ships transferred to South Vietnam in 1971 and 1972 and known in the Republic of Vietnam Navy as the Trần Quang Khải-class frigates – were the largest warships in the South Vietnamese inventory, and their 5-inch (127-millimeter) guns were South Vietnam's largest naval guns.

=== Service history ===
Trần Bình Trọng and her sisters fought alongside U.S. Navy ships during the final years of the Vietnam War, patrolling the South Vietnamese coast and providing gunfire support to South Vietnamese forces ashore.

==== The Battle of the Paracel Islands ====
Possession of the Paracel Islands had long been disputed between South Vietnam and the People's Republic of China. With South Vietnamese forces stationed on the islands drawing down because they were needed on the Vietnamese mainland in the war with North Vietnam, China took advantage of the situation to send forces to seize the islands.

On 16 January 1974, the South Vietnamese frigate RVNS Lý Thường Kiệt (HQ-16) spotted Chinese forces ashore on the islands. Both Lý Thường Kiệt and the Chinese ordered one another to withdraw, and neither side did. Reinforcements arrived for both sides over the next three days, including Trần Bình Trọng, which appeared on the scene on 18 January 1974 with the commander of the Republic of Vietnam Navy, Captain Hà Văn Ngạc, aboard.

By the morning of 19 January 1974, the Chinese had four corvettes and two submarine chasers at the Paracels, while the South Vietnamese had Trần Bình Trọng, Lý Thường Kiệt, the frigate RVNS Trần Khánh Dư (HQ-4), and the corvette RVNS Nhật Tảo (HQ-10) on the scene. Trần Bình Trọng landed South Vietnamese troops on Duncan Island (or Quang Hoa in Vietnamese), and they were driven off by Chinese gunfire. The South Vietnamese ships opened fire on the Chinese ships at 10:24 hours, and the 40-minute Battle of the Paracel Islands ensued. Nhật Tảo was sunk, and the other three South Vietnamese ships all suffered damage; not equipped or trained for open-ocean combat and outgunned, the South Vietnamese ships were forced to withdraw. Chinese losses were more difficult to ascertain, but certainly most or all of them suffered damage and one or two may have sunk.

The Chinese seized the islands the next day, and they have remained under the control of the People's Republic of China ever since.

==== Flight to the Philippines ====
When South Vietnam collapsed at the end of the Vietnam War in late April 1975, Trần Bình Trọng became a ship without a country. She fled to Subic Bay in the Philippines, packed with South Vietnamese refugees. On 22 and 23 May 1975, a U.S. Coast Guard team inspected Trần Bình Trọng and five of her sister ships, which also had fled to the Philippines in April 1975. One of the inspectors noted: "These vessels brought in several hundred refugees and are generally rat-infested. They are in a filthy, deplorable condition. Below decks generally would compare with a garbage scow."

== Philippine Navy service ==
After Trần Bình Trọng had been cleaned and repaired, the United States formally transferred her to the Republic of the Philippines on 5 April 1976. She was commissioned into the Philippine Navy as the frigate RPS Francisco Dagohoy (PF-10) (Note: This article assumes that the authoritative Jane's Fighting Ships 1980-1981, p. 370, is correct about Francisco Dagohoy's lineage (i.e., that she was the former USS Castle Rock (AVP-35), USCGC Castle Rock (WAVP-383/WHEC-383), and RVNS Trần Bình Trọng (HQ-05)). The United States Coast Guard Historian's Office (see http://www.uscg.mil/history/webcutters/CastleRock1948.asp) and Conway's All the World's Fighting Ships 1947-1982 Part II: The Warsaw Pact and Non-Aligned Nations, p. 356, agree with Jane's that Francisco Dagohoy was the former Castle Rock and Trần Bình Trọng. However, extensive confusion exists on the Web. NavSource in its entry for Castle Rock (see http://www.navsource.net/archives/09/43/4335.htm) also agrees with Jane's that Trần Bình Trọng (HQ-05) became Francisco Dagohoy. Meanwhile, the Inventory of VNN's Battle Ships Part 1 (see Part 1 at http://www.vnafmamn.com/VNNavy_inventory.html) claims that Trần Bình Trọng was the former Chincoteague and became yet another Philippine Navy ship, BRP Andrés Bonifacio (PF-7), and in its Part 2 (see Part 2 at http://www.vnafmamn.com/VNNavy_inventory2.html) says that Castle Rock became an entirely different South Vietnamese ship, RVNS Ngô Quyền (HQ-17), before becoming Francisco Dagohoy. The Dictionary of American Naval Fighting Ships entries for Castle Rock (see http://www.history.navy.mil/danfs/c4/castle_rock.htm) and Chincoteague (see http://www.history.navy.mil/danfs/c8/chincoteague.htm) apparently were written before the ships were transferred to South Vietnam or the Philippines and have not been updated, and therefore make no mention at all of their South Vietnamese or Philippine Navy service.) on 23 June 1979. In June 1980 she was reclassified and renamed BRP Francisco Dagohoy (PF-10). She and three other Barnegat- and Casco-class ships were known as the Andrés Bonifacio-class frigates in Philippine service and were the largest Philippine Navy ships of their time.

=== Modernization ===
The Andrés Bonifacio-class frigates were passed to the Philippine Navy with fewer weapons aboard than they had had during their U.S. Navy and U.S. Coast guard careers and with old surface search radars installed. The Philippine Navy addressed these shortfalls through modernization programs. In Philippine service, Francisco Dagohoy retained her South Vietnamese armament, consisting of a single Mark 12 5"/38 caliber (127-mm) gun, a dual-purpose weapon capable of anti-surface and anti-air fire, mounted in a Mark 30 Mod 0 enclosed base ring with a range of up to 18,200 yards (16,600 m) yards; two twin Mark 1 Bofors 40mm anti-aircraft gun mounts, four Mk. 4 single 20-millimeter Oerlikon anti-aircraft gun mounts, four M2 Browning .50-caliber (12.7-millimeter) general-purpose machine guns, and two 81-mm mortars. However, in 1979 Hatch and Kirk, Inc., added a helicopter deck aft which could accommodate a Philippine Navy MBB Bo 105C helicopter for utility, scouting, and maritime patrol purposes, although the ship had no capability to refuel or otherwise support visiting helicopters. The Sperry SPS-53 surface search and navigation radar also was installed, replacing the AN/SPS-23 radar, although the ship retained both its AN/SPS-29D air search radar and its Mark 26 Mod 1 Fire Control Radar System. The Philippine Navy made plans to equip Francisco Dagohoy and her sister ships with new radar systems and long-range BGM-84 Harpoon anti-ship cruise missiles, but this upgrade did not materialize due to the worsening political and economic crisis in the Philippines in the mid-1980s.

=== Service history ===
Francisco Dagohoy served in the Philippine Navy until she was decommissioned along with two other Andrés Bonifacio-class frigates in June 1985. Unlike her two decommissioned sister ships, Francisco Dagohoy was never re-activated. She was discarded in March 1993 and probably scrapped.
