= BRP Francisco Dagohoy (PF-10) =

History

Philippines
- Name: Francisco Dagohoy
- Namesake: Filipino revolutionary Francisco Dagohoy (fl. 1700s)
- Builder: Lake Washington Shipyard, Houghton, Washington
- Laid down: 12 July 1943
- Launched: 11 March 1944
- Completed: October 1944
- Commissioned: 23 June 1979
- Decommissioned: June 1985
- Renamed: BRP Francisco Dagohoy (PF-10) July 1980 - 1985
- Fate: Discarded March 1993; probably scrapped
- Notes: Served as United States Navy seaplane tender USS Castle Rock (AVP-35) 1944-1946; Served as U.S. Coast Guard cutter USCGC Castle Rock (WAVP-383), later WHEC-383, 1948-1971; Served as South Vietnamese as frigate RVNS Trần Bình Trọng (HQ-05) 1971-1975

General characteristics
- Class & type: Andrés Bonifacio-class frigate
- Type: Frigate
- Displacement: 1,766 tons standard, 2,800 tons full load
- Length: 311.65 ft (94.99 m)
- Beam: 41.18 ft (12.55 m)
- Draft: 13.66 ft (4.16 m)
- Installed power: 6,200 brake horsepower (4.63 megawatts)
- Propulsion: 2 × Fairbanks Morse 38D8 1/8 diesel engines
- Speed: 18.2 knots (33.7 km/h) (maximum)
- Range: 8,000 nautical miles (15,000 km) at 15.6 knots (28.9 km/h)
- Complement: About 200
- Sensors & processing systems: Sperry SPS-53 Surface Search Radar; Westinghouse AN/SPS-29D Air Search Radar; Mk.26 Mod.1 Fire Control System; Mk.52 Mod.3 Gun Director
- Armament: 1 × Mk.12 5-inch/38-caliber (127 mm) dual-purpose gun; 2 × Mk.1 Twin Bofors L/60 40 mm AA guns; 2 × Mk.3 Single Bofors L/60 40 mm AA guns; 4 × Twin Oerlikon 20 mm cannon; 4 × M2 Browning .50-caliber (12.7-mm) general-purpose machine guns; 2 × 81 mm Mortars
- Aircraft carried: None permanently assigned; helipad could accommodate one MBB Bo 105 Helicopter
- Aviation facilities: Helipad; no support facilities aboard

The BRP Francisco Dagohoy (PF-10) was an Andrés Bonifacio-class frigate of the Philippine Navy that served from 1979 to 1985. She was one of six ex-United States Navy Barnegat-class small seaplane tenders and ex-United States Coast Guard Casco-class high endurance cutters received from the United States after the Vietnam War, two of which were cannibalized for spare parts without entering service. She and her other three sister ships were the largest Philippine Navy ships of their time.

== History ==
=== Construction and United States Navy service 1944-1946 ===
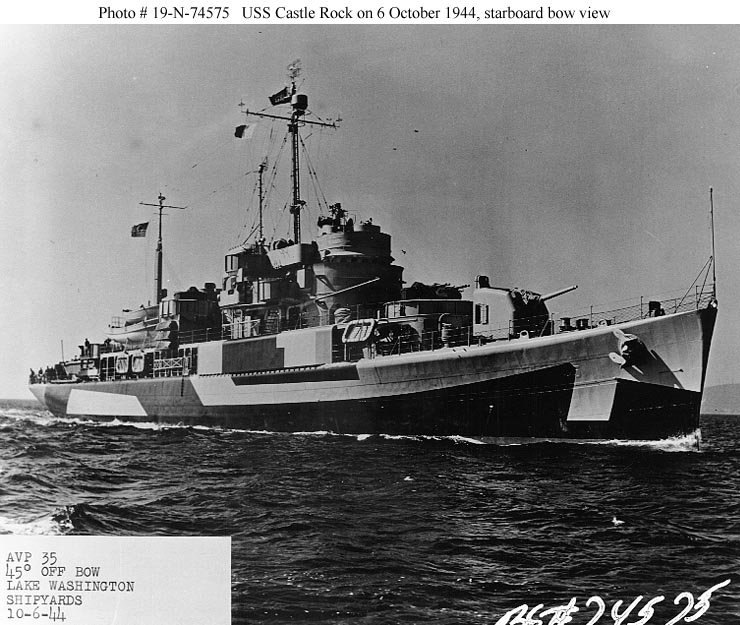
USS Castle Rock (AVP-35) circa 1944

Francisco Dagohoy was built in the United States by Lake Washington Shipyard at Houghton, Washington, as the United States Navy Barnegat-class seaplane tender USS Castle Rock (AVP-35). Commissioned in October 1944, Castle Rock served in the Central Pacific during and after World War II. She was decommissioned in June 1946 and placed in reserve.

=== United States Coast Guard service 1949-1971 ===
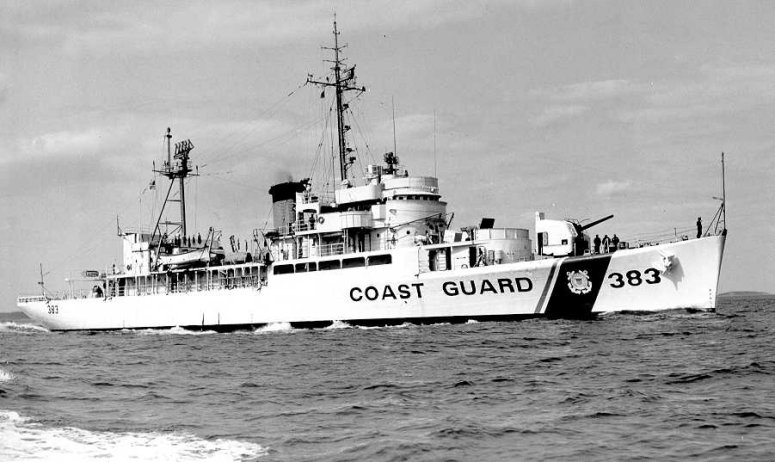
USCGC Castle Rock (WAVP-383) circa 1969

In 1948, the U.S. Navy loaned Castle Rock to the United States Coast Guard, which commissioned her that year as the cutter USCGC Castle Rock (WAVP-383). She was later reclassified as a high endurance cutter and redesignated WHEC-383. While in Coast Guard service, her primary duty was to patrol ocean stations, reporting weather data and engaging in search-and-rescue and law-enforcement operations. She also performed combat duty in the Vietnam War for a few months in 1971.

== Republic of Vietnam Navy service 1971-1975 ==
Castle Rock was transferred to South Vietnam on 21 December 1971 and was commissioned into the Republic of Vietnam Navy as the frigate RVNS Trần Bình Trọng (HQ-05). She fought in the Battle of the Paracel Islands in 1974.

When South Vietnam collapsed at the end of the Vietnam War in late April 1975, Trần Bình Trọng fled to Subic Bay in the Philippines, packed with South Vietnamese refugees. On 22 May 1975 and 23 May 1975, a U.S. Coast Guard team inspected Trần Bình Trọng and five of her sister ships, which also had fled to the Philippines in April 1975. One of the inspectors noted: "These vessels brought in several hundred refugees and are generally rat-infested. They are in a filthy, deplorable condition. Below decks generally would compare with a garbage scow."

== Philippine Navy service 1979-1985 ==
After Trần Bình Trọng had been cleaned and repaired, the United States formally transferred her to the Republic of the Philippines on 5 April 1976. She was commissioned into the Philippine Navy as frigate RPS Francisco Dagohoy on 23 June 1979. In June 1980 she was reclassified and renamed as BRP Francisco Dagohoy (PF-10). She served in the Philippine Navy until she was decommissioned in June 1985. Unlike her two other decommissioned sisterships, Francisco Dagohoy was never re-activated after her decommissioning.

Francisco Dagohoy was discarded in March 1993 and probably scrapped.

== Technical details ==
There were changes made to the Andrés Bonifacio class as compared to their original design during its service with the US Navy, US Coast Guard and the Republic of Vietnam Navy. The ships were passed to the Philippine Navy with fewer weapons on-board and old surface search radars, and these were addressed later on by the Philippine Navy through modernization programs, including the addition of a helicopter landing pad in 1979.

The single Mark 12 5-inch/38-caliber (127 mm) gun was Francisco Dagohoy's primary weapon. It was mounted in a Mark 30 Mod 0 enclosed base ring and had a range of up to 18,200 yards (16,600 m). The gun was a dual-purpose type, capable of both antisurface and antiair warfare. She also carried two twin Mark 1 Bofors 40 mm anti-aircraft guns, four Mark 4 single 20 mm Oerlikon cannons, four .50-caliber (12.7-mm) general-purpose machine guns, and two 81 mm mortars.

Radar system installed include the Sperry SPS-53 Surface Search & Navigation Radar replacing the previously installed AN/SPS-23, while retaining both the AN/SPS-29D Air Search Radar and Mk.26 Mod.1 Fire Control Radar System.

Hatch and Kirk, Inc. added a helicopter deck aft in 1979. Although the ship had no capability to house or service visiting helicopters, the helicopter deck could accommodate one MBB Bo 105C helicopter, used by the Philippine Navy for utility, scout, and maritime patrol purposes.

Francisco Dagohoy was powered by two Fairbanks-Morse 38D diesel engines with a combined power of around 6,200 brake horsepower (4.63 megawatts), driving two propellers. The main engines could propel the 1,766-displacement-ton (standard load) ship at a maximum speed of around 18 knots (33 km/h). She had a maximum range of 8,000 nautical miles (14,820 km) at an economical speed of 15.6 knots (29 km/h).

The Philippine Navy made plans to upgrade the entire ship class with new radar systems and the BGM-84 Harpoon long-range anti-ship cruise missile, but this did not materialize due to the worsening political and economic crisis in the Philippines in the mid-1980s.
