= BRP Diego Silang (PF-9) =

History

Philippines
- Name: Diego Silang
- Namesake: Filipino revolutionary Diego Silang y Andaya (1730-1763)
- Builder: Lake Washington Shipyard, Houghton, Washington
- Laid down: 6 June 1943
- Launched: 15 January 1944
- Completed: July 1944
- Acquired: 5 April 1976
- Commissioned: 5 April 1976
- Decommissioned: April 1990
- Renamed: BRP Diego Silang (PF-9) June 1980 - 1985; BRP Diego Silang (PF-14) 1987 - 1990
- Fate: Discarded July 1990; probably scrapped
- Notes: Served as United States Navy seaplane tender USS Bering Strait (AVP-34) (1944-1946); Served as U.S. Coast Guard cutter USCGC Bering Strait (WAVP-382), later WHEC-382, (1949-1971); Served as South Vietnamese Navy frigate RVNS Trần Quang Khải (HQ-02) (1971-1975)

General characteristics
- Class & type: Andrés Bonifacio-class frigate
- Displacement: 1,766 tons (standard); 2,800 tons (full load)
- Length: 311.65 ft (94.99 m)
- Beam: 41.18 ft (12.55 m)
- Draft: 13.66 ft (4.16 m)
- Installed power: 6,200 horsepower (4.63 megawatts)
- Propulsion: 2 × Fairbanks Morse 38D8 1/8 diesel engines
- Speed: 18.2 knots (33.7 km/h; 20.9 mph) (maximum)
- Range: 8,000 nautical miles (15,000 km) at 15.6 knots (28.9 km/h)
- Sensors & processing systems: Sperry SPS-53 Surface Search Radar; Westinghouse AN/SPS-29 Air Search Radar; Mk.26 Mod.1 Fire Control System; Mk.52 Mod.3 Gun Director
- Armament: 1 × Mk.12 5"/38 caliber gun (127 mm) dual purpose gun; 2 × Mk.1 Twin Bofors L/60 40 mm AA guns; 2 × Mk.3 Single Bofors L/60 40 mm AA guns; 4 × Twin Oerlikon 20 mm cannon; 4 × M2 Browning .50-caliber (12.7 mm) general purpose machine guns; 2 × 81 mm Mortars
- Aircraft carried: None permanently assigned; helipad could accommodate one MBB Bo 105 Helicopter
- Aviation facilities: Helipad; no support capability

BRP Diego Silang (PF-9) was an Andrés Bonifacio-class frigate of the Philippine Navy in commission from 1976 to 1990. She and her three sister ships were the largest Philippine Navy ships of their time.

== History ==
=== Construction and United States Navy service 1944-1946 ===
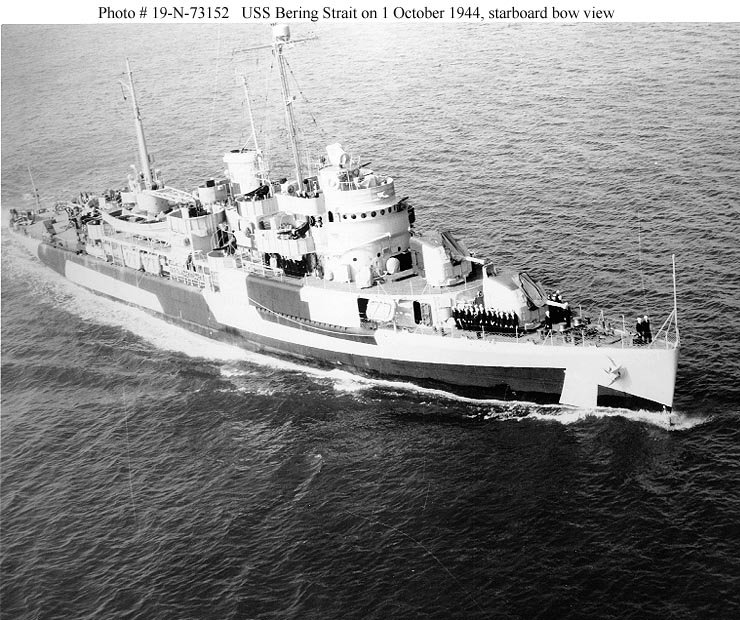
USS Bering Strait (AVP-34) circa 1944

Diego Silang was built in the United States by Lake Washington Shipyard at Houghton, Washington, as the United States Navy Barnegat-class seaplane tender USS Bering Strait (AVP-34). Commissioned in July 1944, Bering Strait served in the Central Pacific during World War II and on occupation duty in Japan postwar. She was decommissioned in June 1946 and placed in reserve.

=== United States Coast Guard service 1949-1971 ===
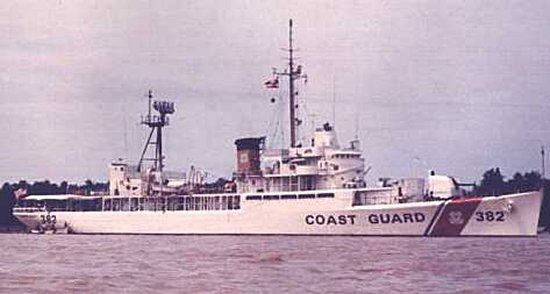
USCGC Bering Strait (WAVP-382) circa late 1960s

The U.S. Navy loaned Bering Strait to the United States Coast Guard, which commissioned her in 1949 as the Casco-class Coast Guard cutter USCGC Bering Strait (WAVP-382). Reclassified as a high endurance cutter and redesignated WHEC-382 in 1966, she patrolled ocean stations in the Pacific Ocean, for nearly 22 years, reporting weather data and engaging in search-and-rescue and law-enforcement operations. During the Vietnam War, she served two tours off Vietnam, in 1967-1968 and in 1970.

=== Republic of Vietnam Navy service 1971-1975 ===
Bering Strait was transferred to South Vietnam in 1971 and was commissioned into the Republic of Vietnam Navy as the frigate RVNS Trần Quang Khải (HQ-02). When South Vietnam collapsed at the end of the Vietnam War in April 1975, Trần Quang Khải fled to Subic Bay in the Philippines, packed with South Vietnamese refugees.

== Acquisition by the Philippines ==
On 22 May 1975 and 23 May 1975, a U.S. Coast Guard team inspected Trần Quang Khải and several other former Casco-class cutters which had been transferred to South Vietnam in 1971 and 1972 and, like Trần Quang Khải, fled to the Philippines in April 1975. One of the inspectors noted: "These vessels brought in several hundred refugees and are generally rat-infested. They are in a filthy, deplorable condition. Below decks generally would compare with a garbage scow." After Trần Quang Khải was cleaned, repaired, and made ready to return to service, the U.S. Navy transferred her to the Republic of the Philippines, with the formal transfer occurring on 5 April 1976.

== Philippine Navy service 1977-1990 ==
The ship was acquired by the Philippine government on 5 April 1976, and was commissioned as Philippine Navy frigate RPS Diego Silang (PF-9). In June 1980 she was reclassified and renamed as BRP Diego Silang (PF-9), and served the Philippine Navy until her decommissioning in June 1985. She was again recommissioned afterwards as BRP Diego Silang (PF-14) and was finally decommissioned in April 1990.

== Disposal ==
After finding her beyond economical repair, Diego Silang was discarded in July 1990 and probably scrapped. Some of her usable parts were made available for her sister ship BRP Andrés Bonifacio (PF-7).

== Technical details ==
There were changes made to the Andrés Bonifacio class as compared to their original design during its service with the US Navy, US Coast Guard and the Republic of Vietnam Navy. The ships were passed to the Philippine Navy with fewer weapons on-board and old surface search radars, and these were addressed later on by the Philippine Navy through modernization programs, including the addition of a helicopter landing pad in 1979.

The single Mk.12 5"/38 caliber gun (127 mm) was Diego Silang's primary weapon. It was mounted in a Mark 30 Mod 0 enclosed base ring and had a range of up to 18,200 yards (16,600 m) yards; the gun was a dual-purpose weapon, capable of anti-surface and anti-air warfare. She also carried two twin Mk.1 Bofors 40mm anti-aircraft gun mounts, four Mk. 4 single 20-millimeterOerlikon anti-aircraft gun mounts, four M2 Browning .50-caliber (12.7-millimeter) general-purpose machine guns, and two 81mm mortars.

A helicopter deck was added aft in 1979 by Hatch and Kirk, Inc. It could accommodate a MBB Bo 105C helicopter used by the Philippine Navy for utility, scout, and maritime patrol purposes, although the ship had no capability to refuel or otherwise support visiting helicopters.

Radar system installed include the Sperry SPS-53 Surface Search & Navigation Radar replacing the previously installed AN/SPS-23, while retaining both the AN/SPS-29D Air Search Radar and Mk.26 Mod.1 Fire Control Radar System.

Diego Silang was powered by two Fairbanks-Morse 38D diesel engines with a combined power of around 6,200 brake horsepower (4.63 megawatts) driving two propellers. The main engines could propel the 1,766-ton-displacement (standard load) ship at a maximum speed of around 18 knots (33 km/h). She had a maximum range of 8,000 nautical miles (14,820 km) at an economical speed of 15.6 knots (29 km/h).

The Philippine Navy made plans to equip Diego Silang and her sister ships with new radar systems and long-range BGM-84 Harpoon anti-ship cruise missiles, but this upgrade did not materialize due to the worsening political and economic crisis in the Philippines in the mid-1980s.
