= BRP Gregorio del Pilar (PF-8) =

History

Philippines
- Name: Gregorio del Pilar
- Namesake: Gregorio del Pilar (1875–1899), a Filipino revolutionary general
- Builder: Lake Washington Shipyard, Houghton, Washington
- Laid down: 1 February 1943
- Launched: 10 July 1943
- Completed: May 1944
- Acquired: 5 April 1976
- Commissioned: 7 February 1977
- Decommissioned: April 1990
- Renamed: BRP Gregorio del Pilar (PF-8) June 1980 - 1985; BRP Gregorio del Pilar (PF-12) 1987 - 1990
- Fate: Discarded July 1990; probably scrapped
- Notes: Served as United States Navy motor torpedo boat tender USS Wachapreague (AGP-8) (1944-1946); Served as U.S. Coast Guard cutter USCGC McCulloch (WAVP-386), later WHEC-386, (1946-1972); Served as South Vietnamese frigate RVNS Ngô Quyền (HQ-17) (1972-1975)

General characteristics
- Class & type: Andrés Bonifacio-class frigate
- Displacement: 1,766 tons (standard); 2,800 tons (full load)
- Length: 311.65 ft (94.99 m)
- Beam: 41.18 ft (12.55 m)
- Draft: 13.66 ft (4.16 m)
- Installed power: 6,200 bhp (4,600 kW)
- Propulsion: 2 × Fairbanks-Morse 38D diesel engines
- Speed: 18.2 knots (33.7 km/h; 20.9 mph) (maximum)
- Range: 8,000 nmi (15,000 km; 9,200 mi) at 15.6 knots (28.9 km/h; 18.0 mph)
- Complement: Approximately 200
- Sensors & processing systems: Sperry SPS-53 surface search radar; Westinghouse AN/SPS-29D air search radar; Mk.26 Mod.1 fire control system; Mk.52 Mod.3 gun director
- Armament: 1 × Mk.12 5-inch/38-caliber (127 mm) dual-purpose gun; 2 × Mk.1 Twin Bofors L/60 40 mm AA guns; 2 × Mk.3 Single Bofors L/60 40 mm AA guns; 4 × Twin Oerlikon 20 mm cannon; 4 × M2 Browning .50-caliber general-purpose machine guns; 2 × 81 mm Mortars
- Aircraft carried: None permanently assigned; helipad could accommodate one MBB Bo 105 Helicopter
- Aviation facilities: Helipad; no support facilities aboard

BRP Gregorio del Pilar (PF-8) was an Andrés Bonifacio-class frigate of the Philippine Navy in commission from 1977 to 1990. She was one of six ex-United States Navy Barnegat-class seaplane tenders/ex-United States Coast Guard Casco-class high endurance cutters received from the United States after the Vietnam War, two of which were acquired to supply spare parts for the other four. She and her three commissioned sister ships were the largest Philippine Navy combat ships of their time.

== History ==
=== Construction and United States Navy service 1944-1946 ===
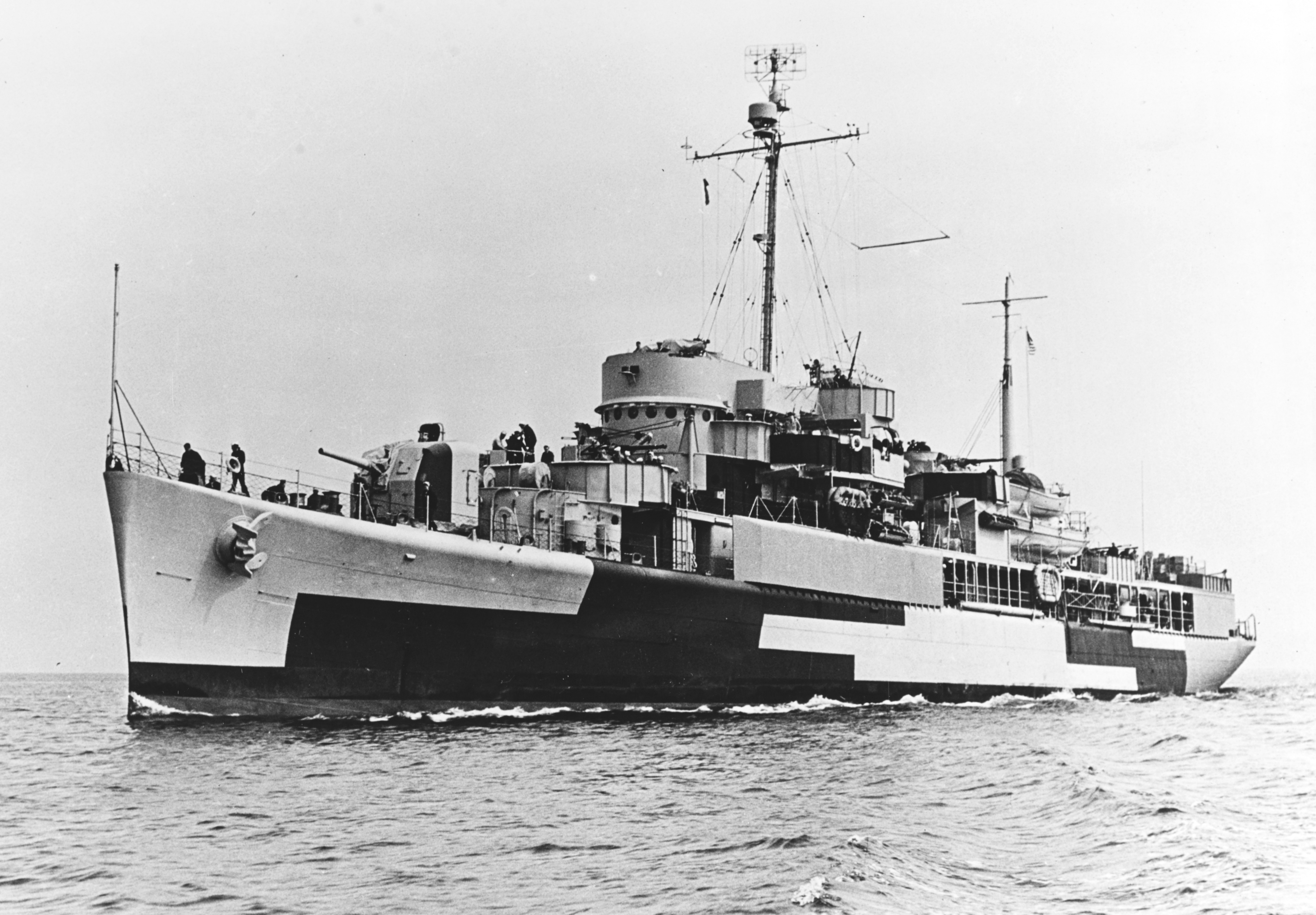
as USS Wachapreague (AGP-8) circa 1944

Gregorio del Pilar was laid down in the United States by Lake Washington Shipyard at Houghton, Washington, as the Barnegat-class small seaplane tender USS Wachapreague (AVP-56), but was converted prior to completion into the motor torpedo boat tender USS Wachapreague (AGP-8). Commissioned into the U.S. Navy in May 1944, she served during World War II in the New Guinea campaign, the Philippines campaign, and the campaign in Borneo, and performed postwar service in Borneo. She was decommissioned in May 1946.

=== United States Coast Guard service 1946-1972 ===
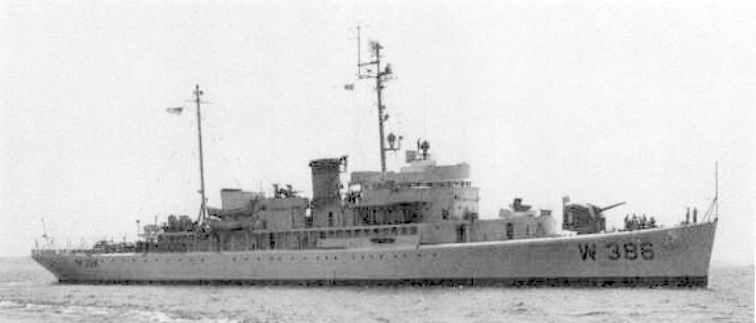
as USCGC McCulloch (WAVP-386)

In 1946, the U.S. Navy transferred Wachapreague to the United States Coast Guard, which commissioned her as the Coast Guard cutter USCGC McCulloch (WAVP-386). Reclassified as a high endurance cutter and redesignated WHEC-386 in 1966, McCulloch served for nearly 26 years, on patrol in ocean stations in the North Atlantic Ocean, reporting weather data and engaging in search-and-rescue and law-enforcement activities.

=== Republic of Vietnam Navy service 1972-1975 ===
Transferred to South Vietnam in 1972, she was commissioned as the patrol vessel RVNS Ngô Quyền (HQ-17). When South Vietnam collapsed at the end of the Vietnam War in late April 1975, Trần Bình Trọng fled to Subic Bay in the Philippines, packed with South Vietnamese refugees. On 22 May 1975 and 23 May 1975, a U.S. Coast Guard team inspected Ngô Quyền and five of her sister ships, which also had fled to the Philippines in April 1975. One of the inspectors noted: "These vessels brought in several hundred refugees and are generally rat-infested. They are in a filthy, deplorable condition. Below decks generally would compare with a garbage scow."

== Philippine Navy service 1977-1990 ==
After Ngô Quyền had been cleaned and repaired, the United States formally transferred her to the Republic of the Philippines on 5 April 1976, and was commissioned into the Philippine Navy as frigate RPS Gregorio del Pilar (PF-8), on 7 February 1977. In June 1980, she was renamed BRP Gregorio del Pilar, and served in the Philippine Navy until she was decommissioned in June 1985. She was again recommissioned afterwards as BRP Gregorio del Pilar (PF-12), and due to the ship's poor condition she was finally decommissioned in April 1990.

Gregorio del Pilar was discarded in July 1990 and probably sold as scrap.

== Technical details ==
There were changes made to the Andrés Bonifacio class as compared to their original design during its service with the US Navy, US Coast Guard and the Republic of Vietnam Navy. The ships were passed to the Philippine Navy with fewer weapons on-board and old surface search radars, and these were addressed later on by the Philippine Navy through modernization programs, including the addition of a helicopter landing pad in 1979.

The single Mk. 12 5-inch/38-caliber (127 mm) gun was Andrés Bonifacio's primary weapon. It was mounted in a Mark 30 Mod 0 enclosed base ring and had a range of up to 18,200 yards (16,600 m) yards. The gun was a dual-purpose type, capable of both antisurface and antiair warfare. She also carried a two twin Mk. 1 Bofors 40mm L/60 anti-aircraft guns and two single Mk.3 Bofors 40mm L/60 anti-aircraft guns, four twin 20mm Oerlikon cannons, four M2 Browning .50-caliber (12.7-mm) general-purpose machine guns, and two 81mm mortars.

Radar system installed include the Sperry SPS-53 Surface Search & Navigation Radar replacing the previously installed AN/SPS-23, while retaining both the AN/SPS-29D Air Search Radar and Mk.26 Mod.1 Fire Control Radar System.

Hatch and Kirk, Inc, added a helicopter deck aft in 1979. Although the ship had no permanently assigned aircraft and could provide no servicing for visiting helicopters, the helicopter deck could accommodate a visiting MBB Bo 105C helicopter, used by the Philippine Navy for utility, scout, and maritime patrol purposes.

The ship was powered by two Fairbanks-Morse 38D diesel engines with a combined power of around 6,200 brake horsepower (4.63 megawatts) driving two propellers. The main engines could propel the 1,766-displacement-ton (standard load) ship at a maximum speed of around 18 knots (33 km/h). She had a maximum range of 8,000 nautical miles (14,820 km) at an economical speed of 15.6 knots (29 km/h).

The Philippine Navy made plans to upgrade the entire ship class with new radar systems and the BGM-84 Harpoon long-range anti-ship cruise missile, but this did not materialize due to the worsening political and economic crisis in the Republic of the Philippines in the mid-1980s.
