= BRP Andrés Bonifacio (PF-7) =

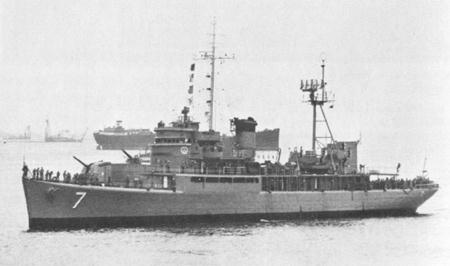
- PF-7 at Manila Bay

History

Philippines
- Name: Andrés Bonifacio
- Namesake: Andrés Bonifacio y de Castro (1863–1897), a Filipino revolutionary leader, regarded as the "Father of the Philippine Revolution" and one of the most influential national heroes of the Philippines
- Builder: Lake Washington Shipyard, Houghton, Washington
- Laid down: 23 July 1941
- Launched: 15 April 1942
- Completed: April 1943
- Acquired: 3 May 1976
- Commissioned: 27 July 1976
- Decommissioned: 30 September 1993
- Fate: Sold for scrapping 2003
- Notes: Served as United States Navy seaplane tender USS Chincoteague (AVP-24) (1943–1946); Served as United States Coast Guard cutter USCGC Chincoteague (WAVP-375) (1949–1972); Served as South Vietnamese frigate RVNS Lý Thường Kiệt (HQ-16) (1972–1975)

General characteristics
- Class & type: Andrés Bonifacio-class frigate
- Displacement: 1,766 tons (standard); 2,800 tons (full load)
- Length: 311.65 ft (94.99 m)
- Beam: 41.18 ft (12.55 m)
- Draft: 13.66 ft (4.16 m)
- Installed power: 6,200 brake horsepower (4.63 megawatts)
- Propulsion: 2 × Fairbanks-Morse 38D8 1/8 diesel engines
- Speed: 18.2 knots (33.7 km/h) (maximum)
- Range: 8,000 nautical miles (15,000 km) at 15.6 knots (28.9 km/h)
- Sensors & processing systems: Sperry AN/SPS-53 Surface Search Radar; Westinghouse AN/SPS-29D Air Search Radar; Mk.26 Mod.1 Fire Control System; Mk.52 Mod.3 Gun Director
- Armament: 1 × Mk.12 5-inch/38-caliber (127 mm) dual-purpose gun; 2 × Mk.1 Twin Bofors 40 mm L/60 AA guns; 2 × Single Bofors 40 mm L/60 AA guns; 4 × Twin Oerlikon 20 mm cannon; 4 × M2 Browning .50-caliber (12.7-mm) general-purpose machine guns; 2 × 81 mm mortars
- Aircraft carried: None permanently assigned; helipad could accommodate one MBB Bo 105 Helicopter
- Aviation facilities: Helipad; no support capability

BRP Andrés Bonifacio (PF-7) was a Philippine Navy frigate in commission from 1976 to 1985. She was one of six ex-United States Navy Barnegat-class small seaplane tenders/ex-United States Coast Guard Casco-class high endurance cutters received from the United States after the Vietnam War, two of which were acquired to supply spare parts for the other four. Andrés Bonifacio was considered the lead ship of her class in the Philippine Navy, and she and her three commissioned sister ships were the largest Philippine Navy combat ships of their time.

In July 2016, a newer frigate received by the Philippine navy from the US Coast Guard was also named BRP Andres Bonifacio (FF-17).

== History ==
=== Construction and United States Navy service 1943–1946 ===
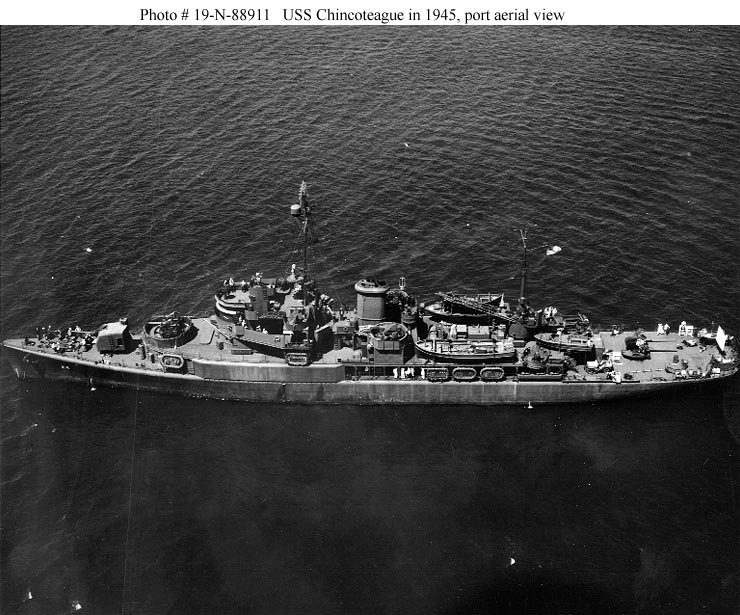
as USS Chincoteague (AVP-24) circa 1945

Andrés Bonifacio was built in the United States by Lake Washington Shipyard at Houghton, Washington, as the United States Navy Barnegat-class seaplane tender USS Chincoteague (AVP-24). Commissioned in April 1943, she operated in support of the New Guinea campaign and in the Central Pacific during World War II and operated at Okinawa and in China after the war. She was decommissioned in December 1946 and placed in reserve.

=== United States Coast Guard service 1949–1972 ===
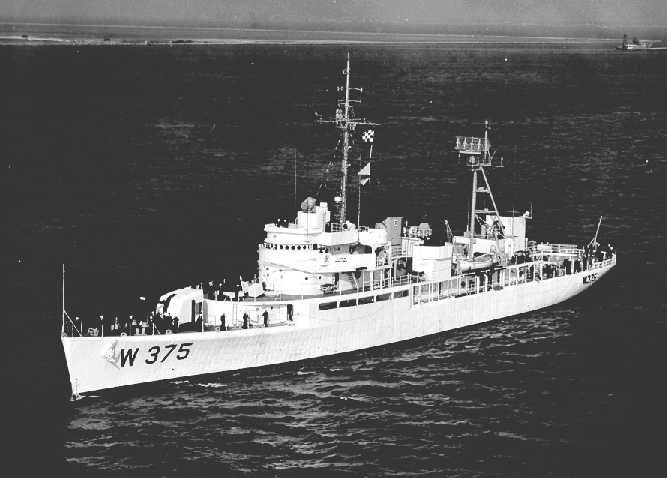
as USCGC Chincoteague (WAVP-375) circa 1964

In 1949 the U.S. Navy loaned Chincoteague to the United States Coast Guard, in which she was commissioned as the Casco-class Coast Guard cutter USCGC Chincoteague (WAVP-375). She was reclassified as a high endurance cutter, redesignated WHEC-375, and transferred permanently from the Navy to the Coast Guard in 1966. Her primary duty was to patrol ocean stations in the North Atlantic Ocean, providing weather data and engaging in search-and-rescue and law-enforcement operations. The Coast Guard decommissioned her in June 1972.

=== Republic of Vietnam Navy service 1972–1975 ===
Due to the Vietnamization Program of the United States Government, Chincoteague was transferred to South Vietnam in June 1972 and was commissioned into the Republic of Vietnam Navy as patrol vessel RVNS Lý Thường Kiệt (HQ-16). She participated in the Battle of the Paracel Islands against ships of the People's Republic of China on 19 January 1974.

When South Vietnam collapsed at the end of the Vietnam War in late April 1975, Lý Thường Kiệt fled to Subic Bay in the Philippines, packed with South Vietnamese refugees. On 22 May 1975 and 23 May 1975, a U.S. Coast Guard team inspected Lý Thường Kiệt and five of her sister ships, which also had fled to the Philippines in April 1975. One of the inspectors noted: "These vessels brought in several hundred refugees and are generally rat-infested. They are in a filthy, deplorable condition. Below decks generally would compare with a garbage scow."

After Lý Thường Kiệt had been cleaned and repaired, the United States formally transferred her to the Republic of the Philippines on 5 April 1976.

== Philippine Navy service ==
=== Active service 1976–1993 ===
The former Lý Thường Kiệt was commissioned into the Philippine Navy as frigate RPS Andrés Bonifacio (PF-7). In June 1980 her prefix was changed from "RPS" to "BRP", and was renamed BRP Andrés Bonifacio (PF-7). She was reportedly decommissioned in June 1985, although she was still listed as "active" as of July 1993.

Andrés Bonifacio became well known as the ship in which renegade Colonel Gregorio "Gringo" Honasan, leader of a nearly successful coup against the Corazon Aquino government, was detained after his capture in December 1987. Together with his 13-man guard escort, he escaped on 2 April 1988.

The Philippine Navy made plans to reactivate Andrés Bonifacio as an auxiliary fleet flagship in 1995, but this never took place due to a lack of funds.

=== Disposal ===
Andrés Bonifacio eventually sank at her berthing area in Fort San Felipe, part of the Sangley Point Naval Base at Cavite City on Luzon. She was refloated and ultimately sold for scrapping in 2003. Her hulk's sale helped the Philippine Navy to finance an upgrade program for its three Jacinto-class corvettes.

== Technical details ==
There were changes made to the Andrés Bonifacio class as compared to their original design during its service with the United States Navy, United States Coast Guard and the Republic of Vietnam Navy. The ships were passed to the Philippine Navy with fewer weapons on-board and old surface search radars, and these were addressed later on by the Philippine Navy through modernization programs, including the addition of a helicopter landing pad in 1979.

The single Mk. 12 5-inch/38-caliber (127 mm) gun was Andrés Bonifacio's primary weapon. It was mounted in a Mark 30 Mod 0 enclosed base ring and had a range of up to 18,200 yards (16,600 m) yards. The gun was a dual-purpose type, capable of both antisurface and antiair warfare. She also carried a two twin Mk. 1 Bofors 40mm L/60 anti-aircraft guns and two single Bofors 40mm L/60 anti-aircraft guns, four twin 20mm Oerlikon cannons, four M2 Browning .50-caliber (12.7-mm) general-purpose machine guns, and two 81mm mortars.

Radar system installed include the Sperry AN/SPS-53 Surface Search & Navigation Radar replacing the previously installed AN/SPS-23, while retaining both the AN/SPS-29D Air Search Radar and Mk.26 Mod.1 Fire Control Radar System.

Hatch and Kirk, Inc, added a helicopter deck aft in 1979. Although the ship had no permanently assigned aircraft and could provide no servicing for visiting helicopters, the helicopter deck could accommodate a visiting MBB Bo 105C helicopter, used by the Philippine Navy for utility, scout, and maritime patrol purposes.

The ship was powered by two Fairbanks-Morse 38D diesel engines with a combined power of around 6,200 brake horsepower (4.63 megawatts) driving two propellers. The main engines could propel the 1,766-ton displacement (standard load) ship at a maximum speed of around 18 knots (33 km/h). The ship had a maximum range of 8,000 nautical miles (14,820 km) at an economical speed of 15.6 knots (29 km/h).

The Philippine Navy made plans to upgrade the entire ship class with new radar systems and the BGM-84 Harpoon long-range anti-ship cruise missile, but this did not materialize due to the worsening political and economic crisis in the Republic of the Philippines in the mid-1980s.

== Notable appearances in media ==
In 1997 movie Iskalawag: Ang batas ay batas, Bonifacio is featured along with other mothballed Philippine Navy ships in a dilapidated state.
