= Andrés Bonifacio-class frigate =

Ship class of four frigates

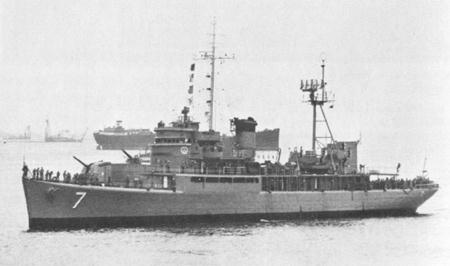

Class overview
- Name: Andrés Bonifacio-class frigate
- Builders: Lake Washington Shipyard, USA
- Operators: Philippine Navy
- Succeeded by: Jose Rizal-class frigate
- In commission: 1976–1993
- Completed: 4
- Retired: 4

General characteristics
- Class & type: Andrés Bonifacio class
- Type: frigate
- Displacement: 2,800 tons (full load); 1,766 tons (standard)
- Length: 311.65 ft (94.99 m)
- Beam: 41.18 ft (12.55 m)
- Draft: 13.66 ft (4.16 m)
- Installed power: 6,400 hp (4,800 kW)
- Propulsion: 2 × Fairbanks Morse 38D Diesel Engines
- Speed: 18.2 knots (33.7 km/h; 20.9 mph) (maximum)
- Range: 8,000 nmi (15,000 km; 9,200 mi) at 15.6 knots (28.9 km/h)
- Sensors & processing systems: Sperry AN/SPS-53 Surface Search Radar; Westinghouse AN/SPS-29D Air Search Radar; Mk.26 Mod.1 Fire Control System; Mk.52 Mod.3 Gun Director
- Armament: 1 × 5"/38 caliber gun 127mm L/38 dual-purpose gun; 2 × Bofors 40 mm Automatic Gun L/60 Mk.1 twin-barrel; 2 × Bofors 40 mm Automatic Gun L/60 single-barrel; 4 × Oerlikon 20 mm cannons twin-barrel; 4 × M2 Browning 50 caliber heavy machine guns; 2 × 81 mm Mortars
- Aircraft carried: MBB Bo 105 Helicopter
- Aviation facilities: Helipad

The Andrés Bonifacio class is a ship class of four frigates that served with the Philippine Navy from 1976 to the mid-1990s. These ships were formerly used by the US Navy as Barnegat-class small seaplane tenders and by the US Coast Guard as Casco-class Coast Guard High Endurance Cutters. Under the Philippine Navy, the four vessels have undergone upgrades and modification, and were categorized as frigates. During their time, they were considered as the largest Philippine Navy combat ships of her time.

== History ==
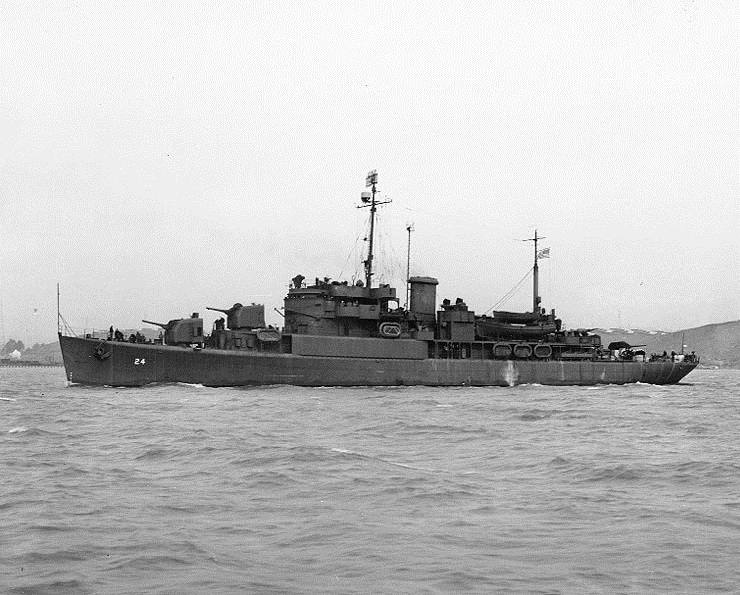
USS Chincoteague, a Barnegat-class small seaplane tender

The Barnegat-class small seaplane tenders also served in the US Coast Guard as the Casco-class cutters. The only class of purpose-built small seaplane tenders in the US Navy, they were designed to operate out of small harbors and atolls and had a shallow draft. The fact that the class was very seaworthy, had good habitability, and long range made them well suited to ocean-station duty. Fast, heavily armed and exceptionally versatile, they served in a wide variety of roles during and after World War II.

Seven units were provided by the US Government to the South Vietnamese Navy between 1970 and 1972. On 29 April 1975, with the South Vietnamese government collapsing and North Vietnamese troops entering Saigon; six of the seven ships set sail and later made a rendezvous at Son Island, the last remaining morsel of free South Vietnam. They remained at anchor until 2 May, when they set sail for Subic Bay, still flying the South Vietnamese flag.

Once they arrived in the Philippines, they presented a slight legal dilemma to the USN as in theory they should have reverted to the new “provisional government” in the former South Vietnam. Eventually it was decided that since the United States did not recognize that government, they were nobody’s property, and were sold to the Philippine navy in 1976 to spare the US government from the expense of having to move them out of Subic Bay for disposal. All were in poor condition, the last pair so much that they were beyond economic restoration. In 1979, the entire aft deck on the remaining four was replaced by a helipad for one Bo-105 helicopter, and a 3 ft 3 in (99 cm) tub for a displaced aft 40 mm (1.6 in) mount was added. Final radar fit was AN/SPS-53, AN/SPS-29, and Mk 26.

== Technical Details ==
There were changes made to the Andrés Bonifacio class as compared to their original design during its service with the US Navy, US Coast Guard and the Republic of Vietnam Navy. The ships were passed to the Philippine Navy with fewer weapons on-board and old surface search radars, and these were addressed later on by the Philippine Navy through modernization programs, including the addition of a helicopter landing pad in 1979.

The single Mk. 12 5-inch/38-caliber (127 mm) gun was Andrés Bonifacio's primary weapon. It was mounted in a Mark 30 Mod 0 enclosed base ring and had a range of up to 18,200 yards (16,600 m) yards. The gun was a dual-purpose type, capable of both antisurface and antiair warfare. She also carried a two twin Mk. 1 Bofors 40mm L/60 anti-aircraft guns and two single Bofors 40mm L/60 anti-aircraft guns, four twin 20mm Oerlikon cannons, four M2 Browning .50-caliber (12.7-mm) general-purpose machine guns, and two 81mm mortars.

Radar system installed include the Sperry AN/SPS-53 Surface Search & Navigation Radar replacing the previously installed AN/SPS-23, while retaining both the AN/SPS-29D Air Search Radar and Mk.26 Mod.1 Fire Control Radar System.

Hatch and Kirk, Inc, added a helicopter deck aft in 1979. Although the ship had no permanently assigned aircraft and could provide no servicing for visiting helicopters, the helicopter deck could accommodate a visiting MBB Bo 105C helicopter, used by the Philippine Navy for utility, scout, and maritime patrol purposes.

The ship was powered by two Fairbanks-Morse 38D diesel engines with a combined power of around 6,200 brake horsepower (4.63 megawatts) driving two propellers. The main engines could propel the 1,766-ton displacement (standard load) ship at a maximum speed of around 18 knots (33 km/h). The ship had a maximum range of 8,000 nautical miles (14,820 km) at an economical speed of 15.6 knots (29 km/h).

The Philippine Navy made plans to upgrade the entire ship class with new radar systems and the BGM-84 Harpoon long-range anti-ship missiles (short-range antiship cruise missiles), but this did not materialize due to the worsening political and economic crisis in the Republic of the Philippines in the mid-1980s.

== Ships in Class ==
Ship name	Bow number	Acquired	Commissioned	Service	Decommissioned	Status
BRP Andrés Bonifacio	PF-7	5 April 1976	27 July 1976	Patrol Force, Philippine Fleet	1993 September 30	Sold as scrap 2003.
BRP Gregorio del Pilar	PF-8	5 April 1976	7 February 1977	Patrol Force, Philippine Fleet	1990 April	Sold as scrap 1991
BRP Diego Silang	PF-9	5 April 1976	5 April 1976 (unconfirmed)	Patrol Force, Philippine Fleet	1990 April	Discarded July 1990, sold as scrap 1993.
BRP Francisco Dagohoy	PF-10	5 April 1976	23 June 1979	Patrol Force, Philippine Fleet	1985 June 9	Discarded March 1993, sold as scrap 1993.

== Gallery ==
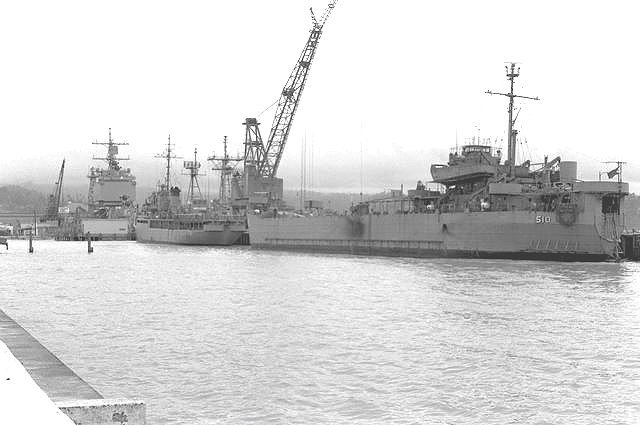
BRP Andrés Bonifacio together with BRP Samar del Norte docked in Subic Bay right after the eruption of Mount Pinatubo in March 1991.
