= Kamishak =

Kamishak may refer to:

- Kamishak Bay, Alaska, United States
- USS Kamishak, a cancelled United States Navy seaplane tender
