= USCGC Point Gammon =

United States Coast Guard cutter

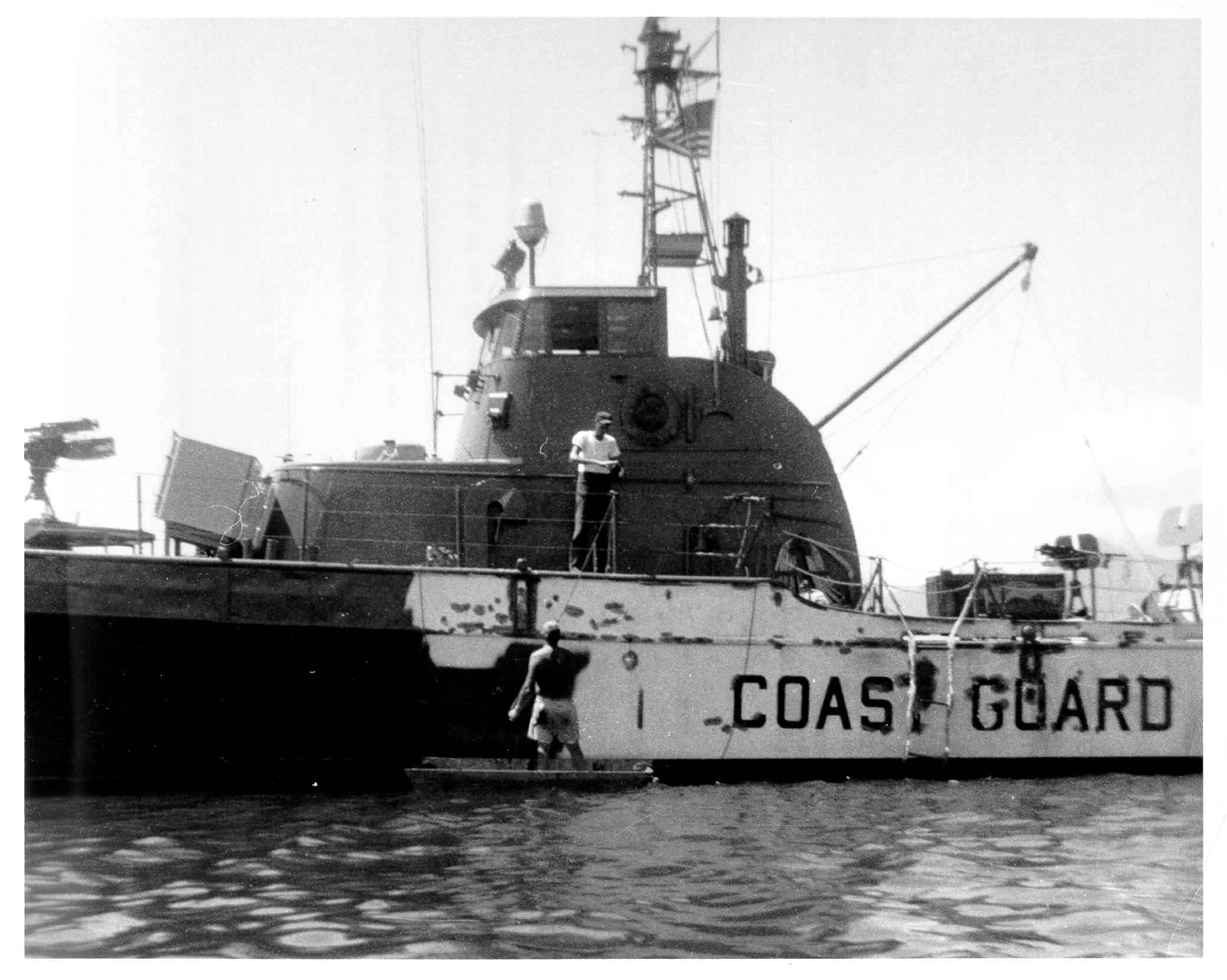
- USCGC Point Gammon gets a camouflage coat of dark grey paint at Da Nang, October 1965

History

United States
- Name: USCGC Point Gammon (WPB-82328)
- Namesake: Point Gammon, West Yarmouth, Massachusetts
- Owner: United States Coast Guard
- Builder: Coast Guard Yard, Curtis Bay, Maryland
- Commissioned: 31 January 1962
- Decommissioned: 11 November 1969
- Honors and awards: Navy Unit Commendation; Vietnam Service Medal with 2 silver and 1 bronze service stars
- Fate: Transferred to Republic of Vietnam Navy as RVNS Nguyễn Đao (HQ-703), 11 November 1969

General characteristics
- Type: Patrol Boat (WPB)
- Displacement: 60 tons
- Length: 82 ft 10 in (25.25 m)
- Beam: 17 ft 7 in (5.36 m) max
- Draft: 5 ft 11 in (1.80 m)
- Propulsion: 2 × 600 hp (447 kW) Cummins diesel engines
- Speed: 16.8 knots (31.1 km/h; 19.3 mph)
- Range: 577 nmi (1,069 km) at 14.5 kn (26.9 km/h; 16.7 mph); 1,271 nmi (2,354 km) at 10.7 kn (19.8 km/h; 12.3 mph)
- Complement: Domestic service : 8 men; Vietnam service : 2 officers, 8 men
- Armament: 1962; 1 × Oerlikon 20 mm cannon; Vietnam service; 5 × M2 Browning machine guns; 1 × 81 mm M29 mortar

USCGC Point Gammon (WPB-82328) was an 82-foot (25 m) Point class cutter constructed at the Coast Guard Yard at Curtis Bay, Maryland in 1962 for use as a law enforcement and search and rescue patrol boat. Since the Coast Guard policy in 1962 was not to name cutters under 100 feet (30 m) in length, it was designated as WPB-82328 when commissioned and acquired the name Point Gammon in January 1964 when the Coast Guard started naming all cutters longer than 65 feet (20 m).

== Construction and design details ==
Point Gammon was built to accommodate an 8-man crew. She was powered by two 600 hp (447 kW) VT600 Cummins diesel main drive engines and had two five-bladed 42 in (1.1 m) propellers. The main drive engines were later replaced by 800 hp (597 kW) VT800 Cummins engines. Water tank capacity was 1,550 U.S. gallons (5,900 L) and fuel capacity was 1,840 U.S. gallons (7,000 L) at 95% full. Engine exhaust was ported through the transom rather than through a conventional stack permitting a 360 degree view from the bridge a useful feature in search and rescue work.

She had a steel hull, an aluminum superstructure with a longitudinally framed construction to save weight. Controls were located on the bridge which allowed one-man operation and eliminated an engineer watch in the engine room. For short periods, a crew of four men could operate the cutter, however, the need for rest brought the practical crew to eight for normal service. The screws were designed for ease of replacement and could be changed without removing the cutter from the water. A clutch-in idle speed of three knots helped to conserve fuel on lengthy patrols and she had an eighteen knot maximum speed.

The deckhouse contained the cabin for the officer-in-charge and the executive petty officer. The deckhouse also included a small arms locker, scuttlebutt, desk and head. Access to the lower deck and engine room was via a ladder, at the bottom of which was the galley, mess and recreation deck. A watertight door at the front of the mess bulkhead led to the crew quarters which was ten feet long with six stowable bunks, three on each side. Forward of the bunks was the crew's head with sink, shower and commode, interior spaces were air-conditioned. Accommodation for a 13-man crew were installed for Vietnam War service.

== History ==
After delivery in 1962, Point Gammon was assigned a homeport of Fort Bragg, California, where she served as law enforcement and search and rescue patrol boat. From 1963 to 1965, she was stationed at Alameda, California. On 20 April 1965, she dewatered and towed the disabled pleasure craft Amigo del Mar into Port Richmond, California.

At the request of the United States Navy, in April 1965, she was alerted for service in South Vietnam and assigned to Coast Guard Squadron One in support of Operation Market Time along with 16 other Point class cutters. While the crew completed overseas training and weapons qualifications at Coast Guard Island and Camp Parks, California, Point Gammon was loaded onto a merchant ship, and transported to Subic Bay, Philippines in May 1965 where she was refitted for combat service. Shipyard modifications included installation of new single-sideband radio equipment, floodlights, bunks, additional sound-powered phone circuits, and the addition of 4 M2 machine guns. The original bow-mounted machine gun was replaced with a combination over-under .50 caliber machine gun/81mm trigger fired mortar that had been developed by the Coast Guard for service in Vietnam. For service in Vietnam, two officers were added to the crew complement to add seniority to the crew in the mission of interdicting vessels at sea.

Point Gammon was assigned to Division 12 of Squadron One to be based at Da Nang, along with USCGC Point Arden, USCGC Point Caution, USCGC Point Dume, USCGC Point Ellis, USCGC Point Lomas, USCGC Point Orient and USCGC Point Welcome. After sea trials, the Division left Subic Bay for Da Nang on 16 July 1965 in the company of USS Snohomish County (LST-1126), their temporary support ship. After almost two weeks at sea, they arrived at their new duty station on 20 July and began patrolling the coastal waters near Danang. Duty consisted of boarding Vietnamese junks to search for contraband weapons and ammunition and check the identification papers of persons on board. Permanent engineering and logistic support of Division 12 was provided by a U.S. Navy non-self-propelled floating workshop, YR-71. During this time, the WPB's were directed to paint the hulls and superstructures formula 20 deck gray to cover the Coast Guard's normal white paint to increase the effectiveness of night patrols.

On 1 January 1967, Point Gammon was on Market Time patrol off An Xuyên Province with U.S. Navy Patrol Craft Fast PCF-68 and PCF-71 intercepted a North Vietnamese steel-hulled trawler. (Note: The Kelley reference is divided into several sections with each section starting its page numbering with page 1, therefore citations for this reference follows the same pattern.) After a firefight involving both Market Time boats, PCF-68 hit the trawler with a mortar round that set the trawler on fire while Point Gammon provided covering fire and illuminated the target with her mortar. The trawler exploded and sank. (Note: The USCGA reference claims a sinking in Hassard's Bronze Star citation while the account of the incident in the Naval Historical Center reference says that there was a possibility of the trawler escaping to a nearby river.)

On 11 November 1969, Point Gammon was the first Division 12 cutter turned over to the Republic of Vietnam Navy as part of the Vietnamization of the war effort. She was recommissioned RVNS Nguyễn Đao (HQ-703).

== Notes ==
Footnotes

Citations

References cited

- "Bronze State Medal citation of Roger W. Hassard". USCGA Wall of Heroes. U.S. Coast Guard Academy. Archived from the original on 4 December 2013.
- Commander, Naval Forces Vietnam (January 1967). "Monthly Historical Summary. January 1967" (PDF). Naval Historical Center, U.S. Navy. pp. 29–30. Archived from the original (PDF) on 20 April 2006.
- Cutler, Thomas J. (2000). Brown Water, Black Berets: Coastal and Riverine Warfare in Vietnam. Naval Institute Press, Annapolis. ISBN 978-1-55750-196-7.
- Kelley, Michael P. (2002). Where We Were in Vietnam. Hellgate Press, Central Point, Oregon. ISBN 978-1-55571-625-7. (Note: The Kelley reference is divided into several sections with each section starting its page numbering with page 1, therefore citations for this reference follows the same pattern.)
- Larzelere, Alex (1997). The Coast Guard at War, Vietnam, 1965–1975. Naval Institute Press, Annapolis. ISBN 978-1-55750-529-3.
- Scheina, Robert L. (1990). U.S. Coast Guard Cutters & Craft, 1946–1990. Naval Institute Press, Annapolis. ISBN 978-0-87021-719-7.
- Scotti, Paul C. (2000). Coast Guard Action in Vietnam: Stories of Those Who Served. Hellgate Press, Central Point, OR. ISBN 978-1-55571-528-1.
- Wells II, William R. (August 1997). "The United States Coast Guard's Piggyback 81mm Mortar/.50 cal. machine gun". Vietnam Magazine.
