= Ready service ammunition =

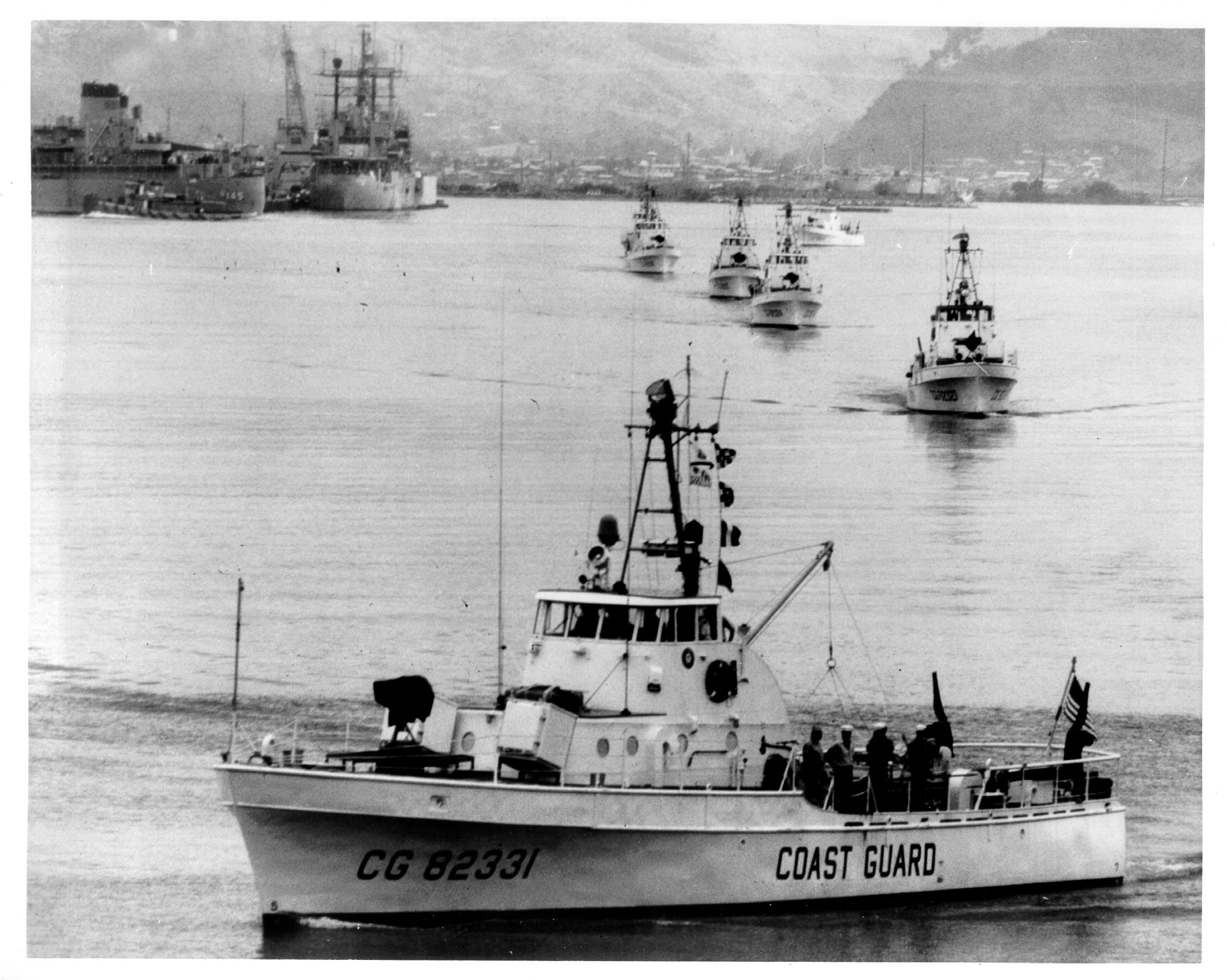
USCGC Point Marone (WPB-82331) leaving Subic Bay Naval Base for Vietnam along with other cutters of Division 11, Coast Guard Squadron One, 24 July 1965. Two ammunition ready boxes containing 81 mm mortar ammunition are visible forward of the deckhouse front bulkhead.

Ready service ammunition is that ammunition located in close proximity to a military or naval gun and is stored in such a manner that it is ready for quick use. Boxes located near a gun are sometimes termed ready boxes. They are designed to keep a small amount of ammunition dry and free of contaminants while affording ready access by gun crews.

Larger amounts of ammunition that would not be immediately used in an emergency situation are normally stored in an ammunition magazine away from the immediate area of use for safety reasons as well as to keep the ammunition free from environmental contamination.
