= USCGC Point Arden =

United States Coast Guard cutter

History

United States
- Name: USCGC Point Arden (WPB-82309)
- Owner: United States Coast Guard
- Builder: Coast Guard Yard, Curtis Bay, Maryland
- Commissioned: 1 February 1961
- Decommissioned: 14 February 1970
- Honors and awards: Navy Unit Commendation; Meritorious Unit Commendation (Navy); Vietnam Service Medal with 2 silver and 1 bronze service stars
- Fate: Transferred to Republic of Vietnam Navy as RVNS Phạm Ngọc Châu (HQ-710), 14 February 1970

General characteristics
- Type: Patrol Boat (WPB)
- Displacement: 60 tons
- Length: 82 ft 10 in (25.25 m)
- Beam: 17 ft 7 in (5.36 m) max
- Draft: 5 ft 11 in (1.80 m)
- Propulsion: 2 × 600 hp (447 kW) Cummins diesel engines
- Speed: 16.8 knots (31.1 km/h; 19.3 mph)
- Range: 577 nmi (1,069 km) at 14.5 kn (26.9 km/h; 16.7 mph); 1,271 nmi (2,354 km) at 10.7 kn (19.8 km/h; 12.3 mph)
- Complement: Domestic service : 8 men; Vietnam service : 2 officers, 8 men
- Armament: 1961; 1 × Oerlikon 20 mm cannon; Vietnam service; 5 × M2 Browning machine guns; 1 × 81 mm M29 mortar

USCGC Point Arden (WPB-82309) was an 82-foot (25 m) Point class cutter constructed at the Coast Guard Yard at Curtis Bay, Maryland in 1961 for use as a law enforcement and search and rescue patrol boat. Since the Coast Guard policy in 1961 was not to name cutters under 100-foot (30 m) in length, it was designated as WPB-82309 when commissioned and acquired the name Point Caution in January 1964 when the Coast Guard started naming all cutters longer than 65-foot (20 m).

== Construction and design details ==
Point Arden was built to accommodate an 8-man crew. She was powered by two 600 hp (447 kW) VT600 Cummins diesel main drive engines and had two five-bladed 42 in (1.1 m) propellers. The main drive engines were later replaced by 800 hp (597 kW) VT800 Cummins engines. Water tank capacity was 1,550 U.S. gallons (5,900 L) and fuel tank capacity was 1,840 U.S. gallons (7,000 L) at 95% full. Engine exhaust was ported through the transom rather than through a conventional stack and this permitted a 360 degree view from the bridge; a feature that was very useful in search and rescue work as well as a combat environment.

The design specifications for Point Arden included a steel hull for durability and an aluminum superstructure and longitudinally framed construction was used to save weight. Ease of operation with a small crew size was possible because of the non-manned main drive engine spaces. Controls and alarms located on the bridge allowed one man operation of the cutter thus eliminating a live engineer watch in the engine room. Because of design, four men could operate the cutter; however, the need for resting watchstanders brought the crew size to eight men for normal domestic service. The screws were designed for ease of replacement and could be changed without removing the cutter from the water. A clutch-in idle speed of three knots helped to conserve fuel on lengthy patrols and an eighteen knot maximum speed could get the cutter on scene quickly. Air-conditioned interior spaces were a part of the original design for the Point class cutter. Interior access to the deckhouse was through a watertight door on the starboard side aft of the deckhouse. The deckhouse contained the cabin for the officer-in-charge and the executive petty officer. The deckhouse also included a small arms locker, scuttlebutt, a small desk and head. Access to the lower deck and engine room was down a ladder. At the bottom of the ladder was the galley, mess and recreation deck. A watertight door at the front of the mess bulkhead led to the main crew quarters which was ten feet long and included six bunks that could be stowed, three bunks on each side. Forward of the bunks was the crew's head complete with a compact sink, shower and commode. Accommodations for a 13-man crew were installed for Vietnam service.

== History ==
After delivery in 1961, Point Arden was assigned a homeport of Point Pleasant, New Jersey, where she served as a law enforcement and search and rescue patrol boat.

At the request of the United States Navy, in April 1965, she was alerted for service in South Vietnam and assigned to Coast Guard Squadron One in support of Operation Market Time along with 16 other Point class cutters. While the crew completed overseas training and weapons qualifications at Coast Guard Island and Camp Parks, California, Point Arden was loaded onto a merchant ship, and transported to Subic Bay, Philippines in May 1965 where she was refit for combat service. Shipyard modifications included installation of new single-sideband radio equipment, additional floodlights, small arms lockers, bunks, additional sound-powered phone circuits, and the addition of 4 M2 machine guns. The original bow mounted machine gun was replaced with a combination over-under .50 caliber machine gun/81mm trigger fired mortar that had been developed by the Coast Guard for service in Vietnam. For service in Vietnam, two officers were added to the crew complement to add seniority to the crew in the mission of interdicting vessels at sea.

Point Arden was assigned to Division 12 of Squadron One to be based at Da Nang, along with USCGC Point Caution, USCGC Point Dume, USCGC Point Ellis, USCGC Point Gammon, USCGC Point Lomas, USCGC Point Orient and USCGC Point Welcome. After sea trials, the Division left Subic Bay for Da Nang on 16 July 1965 in the company of USS Snohomish County, their temporary support ship. After almost two weeks at sea, they arrived at their new duty station on 20 July and began patrolling the coastal waters near Da Nang. Duty consisted of boarding Vietnamese junks to search for contraband weapons and ammunition and check the identification papers of persons on board. Permanent engineering and logistic support of Division 12 was provided by a U.S. Navy non-self-propelled floating workshop, YR-71. During this time, the WPB's were directed to paint the hulls and superstructures formula 20 deck gray to cover the stateside white paint. This increased the effectiveness of night patrols.

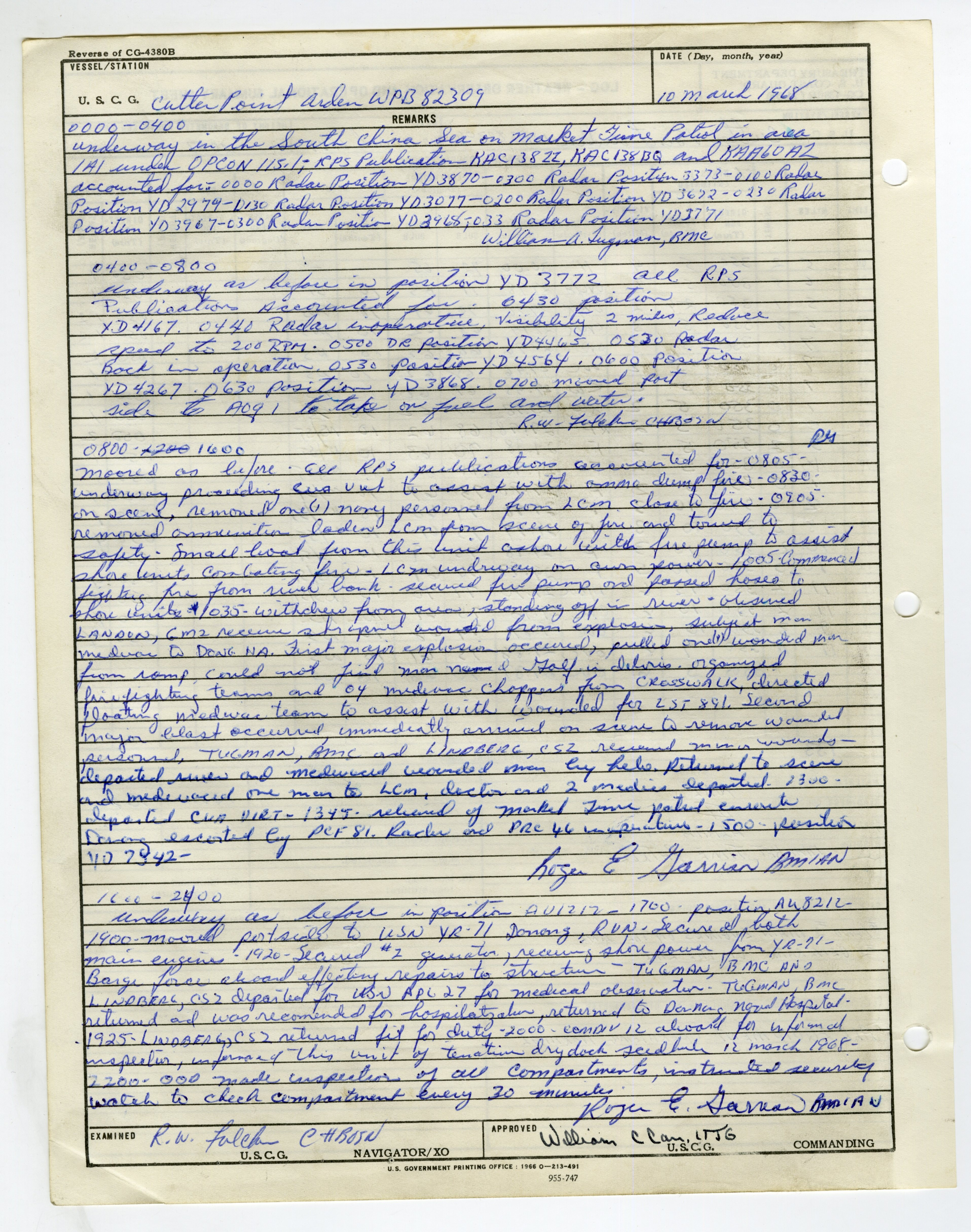
Page of Point Arden's logbook from 10 March 1968

On 10 March 1968, Point Arden was refueling from the U.S. Navy oiler USS Patapsco near Cửa Việt Base when Viet Cong mortar fire ignited some ammunition and flares on the ramp of the Naval Support Activity Detachment (NSAD). The commanding officer of Point Arden, Lieutenant Junior Grade William C. Carr,' directed his crew to offload firefighting gear to the shore to assist in the containment of the fire and he then went to the other side of the ramp with the cutter and the crew used fire hoses to help suppress the fire. Several large explosions occurred during the firefighting and one explosion shattered all the glass on the bridge of the cutter and injured several of the crew. The crew of the Point Arden were commended by the commander of Navy Task Group 115.1 for their firefighting efforts.

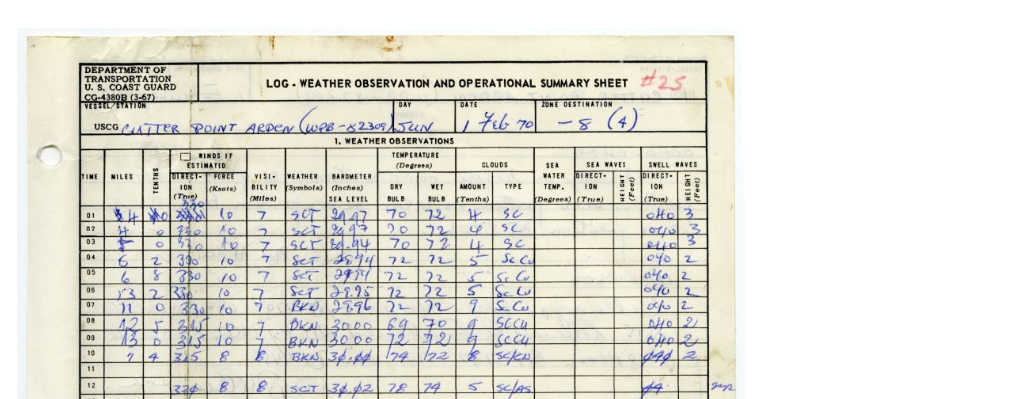
Page from log of the Arden, 1 February 1970

On 9 August 1969, during a harassment and interdiction mission using the cutter's mortar the Executive Officer, LTJG Michael W. Kirkpatrick, and an engineer, EN1 Michael H. Painter were killed by a misfired round in the mortar. They were two of seven Coast Guardsmen killed in action during the Vietnam War.

On 14 February 1970, Point Arden was turned over to the Republic of Vietnam Navy as part of the Vietnamization of the war effort and recommissioned as RVNS Phạm Ngọc Châu (HQ-710).
