= USCGC Point Kennedy =

United States Coast Guard cutter

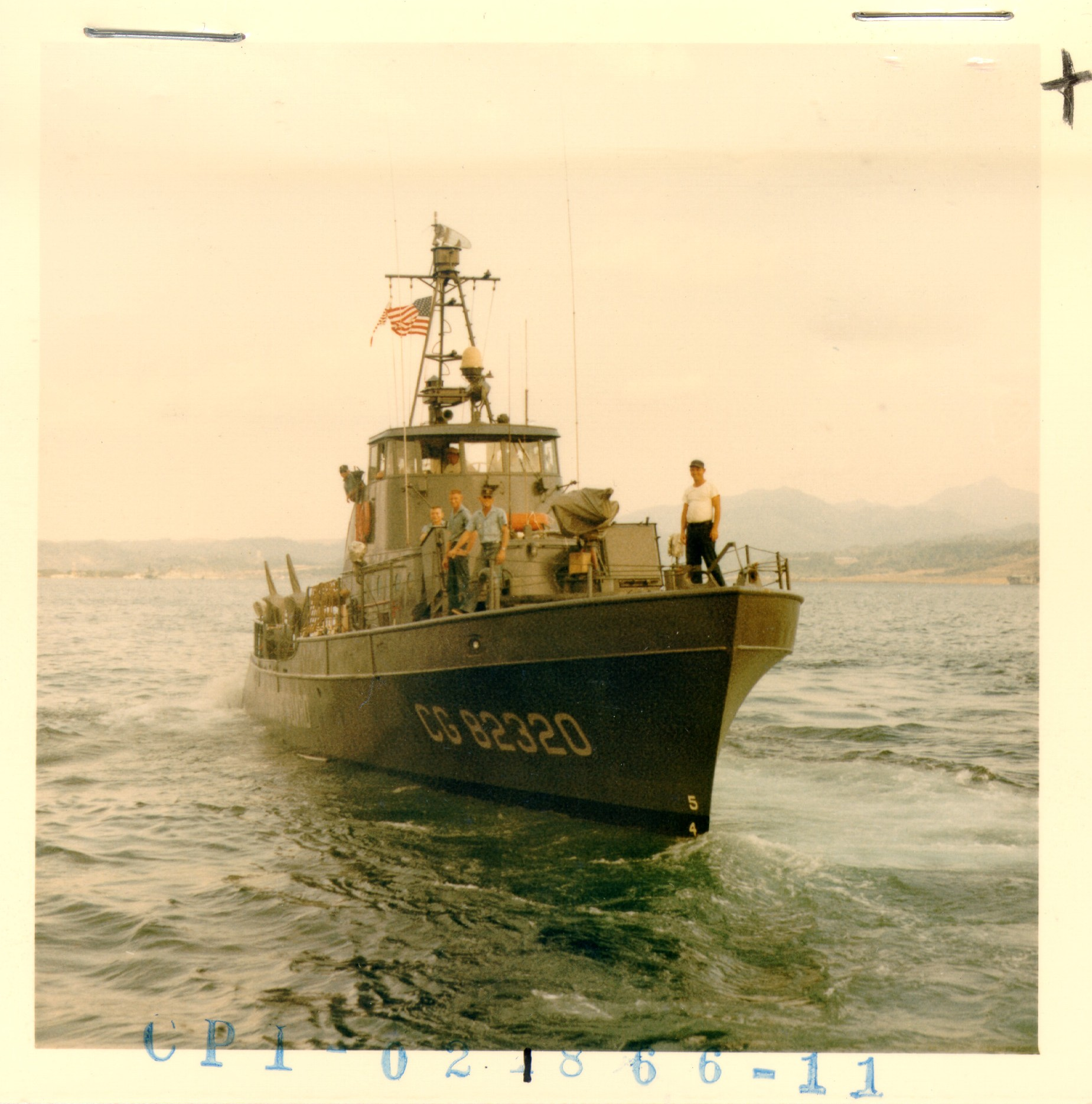
- USCGC Point Kennedy (WPB-82320) departs Subic Bay Naval Base, Philippines bound for Cat Lo Naval Base, RVN, 18 February 1966.

History

United States
- Name: USCGC Point Kennedy (WPB-82320)
- Owner: United States Coast Guard
- Builder: Coast Guard Yard, Curtis Bay, Maryland
- Commissioned: 19 July 1961
- Decommissioned: 16 March 1970
- Honors and awards: Navy Unit Commendation; Meritorious Unit Commendation (Navy); Vietnam Service Medal with 2 silver service stars
- Fate: Transferred to Republic of Vietnam Navy as RVNS Huỳnh Văn Ngan (HQ-713), 16 March 1970

General characteristics
- Type: Patrol Boat (WPB)
- Displacement: 60 tons
- Length: 82 ft 10 in (25.25 m)
- Beam: 17 ft 7 in (5.36 m) max
- Draft: 5 ft 11 in (1.80 m)
- Propulsion: 2 × 600 hp (447 kW) Cummins diesel engines
- Speed: 16.8 knots (31.1 km/h; 19.3 mph)
- Range: 577 nmi (1,069 km) at 14.5 kn (26.9 km/h; 16.7 mph); 1,271 nmi (2,354 km) at 10.7 kn (19.8 km/h; 12.3 mph)
- Complement: Domestic service : 8 men; Vietnam service : 2 officers, 8 men
- Armament: 1961; 1 × Oerlikon 20 mm cannon; Vietnam service; 5 × M2 Browning machine guns; 1 × 81 mm M29 mortar

USCGC Point Kennedy (WPB-82320) was an 82-foot (25 m) Point-class cutter constructed at the Coast Guard Yard at Curtis Bay, Maryland in 1961 for use as a law enforcement and search and rescue patrol boat. Since the Coast Guard policy in 1961 was not to name cutters under 100-foot (30 m) in length, it was designated as WPB-82320 when commissioned and acquired the name Point Kennedy in January 1964 when the Coast Guard started naming all cutters longer than 65-foot (20 m).

== Construction and design details ==
Point Kennedy was built to accommodate an 8-man crew. She was powered by two 600 hp (447 kW) VT600 Cummins diesel main drive engines and had two five-bladed 42 in (1.1 m) propellers. The main drive engines were later replaced by 800 hp (597 kW) VT800 Cummins engines. Water tank capacity was 1,550 U.S. gallons (5,900 L) and fuel tank capacity was 1,840 U.S. gallons (7,000 L) at 95% full. Engine exhaust was ported through the transom rather than through a conventional stack and this permitted a 360-degree view from the bridge; a feature that was very useful in search and rescue work as well as a combat environment.

The design specifications for Point Kennedy included a steel hull for durability and an aluminum superstructure and longitudinally framed construction was used to save weight. Ease of operation with a small crew size was possible because of the non-manned main drive engine spaces. Controls and alarms located on the bridge allowed one man operation of the cutter thus eliminating a live engineer watch in the engine room. Because of design, four men could operate the cutter; however, the need for resting watchstanders brought the crew size to eight men for normal domestic service. The screws were designed for ease of replacement and could be changed without removing the cutter from the water. A clutch-in idle speed of three knots helped to conserve fuel on lengthy patrols and an eighteen knot maximum speed could get the cutter on scene quickly. Air-conditioned interior spaces were a part of the original design for the Point class cutter. Interior access to the deckhouse was through a watertight door on the starboard side aft of the deckhouse. The deckhouse contained the cabin for the officer-in-charge and the executive petty officer. The deckhouse also included a small arms locker, scuttlebutt, a small desk and head. Access to the lower deck and engine room was down a ladder. At the bottom of the ladder was the galley, mess and recreation deck. A watertight door at the front of the mess bulkhead led to the main crew quarters which was ten feet long and included six bunks that could be stowed, three bunks on each side. Forward of the bunks was the crew's head complete with a compact sink, shower and commode. Accommodations for a 13-man crew were installed for Vietnam service.

== History ==
After delivery in 1961, Point Kennedy was assigned a homeport of San Juan, Puerto Rico, where she served as a law enforcement and search and rescue patrol boat.

At the request of the United States Navy, in October 1965, she was alerted for service in South Vietnam and assigned to Coast Guard Squadron One in support of Operation Market Time along with 8 other Point class cutters. While the crew completed overseas training and weapons qualifications at Coast Guard Island and Camp Parks, California, Point Kennedy was loaded onto a merchant ship, and transported to Subic Bay, Philippines arriving in January 1966 where she was refitted for combat service. Shipyard modifications included installation of new single-sideband radio equipment, additional floodlights, small arms lockers, bunks, additional sound-powered phone circuits, and the addition of 4 M2 machine guns. The original Oerlikon 20 mm cannon was replaced with a combination over-under .50 caliber machine gun/81mm trigger-fired mortar that had been developed by the Coast Guard for service in Vietnam. For service in Vietnam, two officers were added to the crew complement to add seniority to the crew in the mission of interdicting vessels at sea.

Point Kennedy was assigned to Division 13 of Squadron One to be based at Cat Lo Naval Base near Vung Tau, along with USCGC Point Cypress, USCGC Point Grace, USCGC Point Hudson, USCGC Point Jefferson, USCGC Point League, USCGC Point Partridge, USCGC Point Slocum and USCGC Point White. After sea trials, the Division left Subic Bay for Cat Lo on 19 February 1966 in the company of USS Forster, their temporary support ship. They arrived at their new duty station on 23 February and began patrolling the coastal waters near the Rung Sat Special Zone. Duty consisted of boarding Vietnamese junks to search for contraband weapons and ammunition and check the identification papers of persons on board.

During May 1967 a hydrographic survey small boat from the USS Maury was hit by enemy fire and was sinking. Point Kennedy assisted with damage control work and provided suppression fire while removing the small boat and Maury from the scene.

As a part of the Vietnamization program Republic of Vietnam Navy (RVNN) crewmen were assigned for training purposes beginning in February 1969. After the crew of Point Kennedy trained an RVNN replacement crew, she was turned over to the RVNN and recommissioned as RVNS Huỳnh Văn Ngan (HQ-713), on 16 March 1970.
