= USS Snohomish County =

World War II landing ship

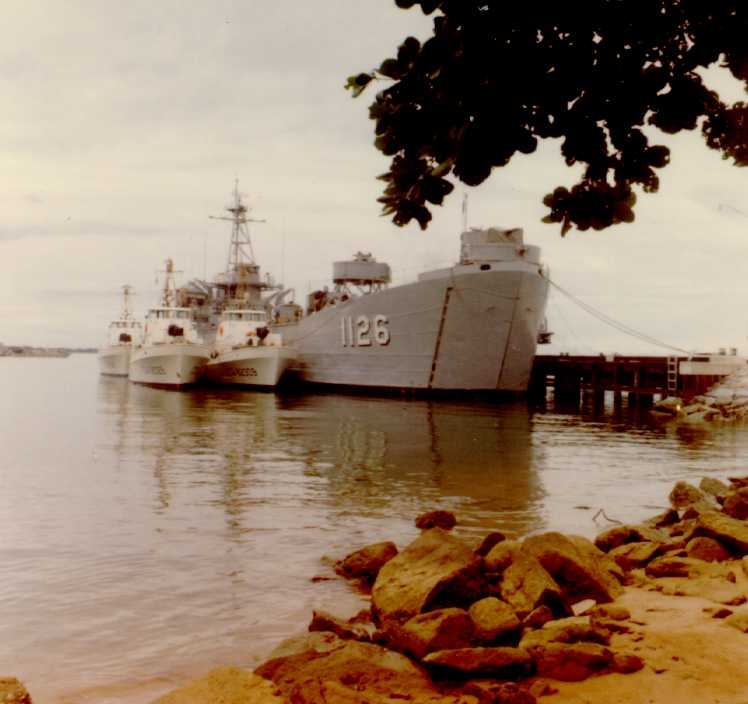
- Snohomish County with US Coast Guard Point-class cutters tied up alongside at Da Nang, Vietnam, 24 July 1965

History

United States
- Name: USS LST-1126
- Builder: Chicago Bridge & Iron Company, Seneca, Illinois
- Laid down: 16 November 1944
- Launched: 9 February 1945
- Commissioned: 28 February 1945
- Decommissioned: 1 July 1970
- Renamed: USS Snohomish County (LST-1126), 1 July 1955
- Decommissioned: 1 July 1970
- Honours and awards: 8 battle stars (Vietnam)
- Fate: Sold for scrapping in January 1971

General characteristics
- Class & type: LST-542-class tank landing ship
- Displacement: 1,625 long tons (1,651 t) light; 4,080 long tons (4,145 t) full
- Length: 328 ft (100 m)
- Beam: 50 ft (15 m)
- Draft: Unloaded : 2 ft 4 in (0.71 m) forward; 7 ft 6 in (2.29 m) aft; Loaded : 8 ft 2 in (2.49 m) forward; 14 ft 1 in (4.29 m) aft
- Propulsion: 2 × General Motors 12-567 diesel engines, two shafts, twin rudders
- Speed: 12 knots (22 km/h; 14 mph)
- Boats & landing craft carried: 2 LCVPs
- Troops: 16 officers, 147 enlisted men
- Complement: 7 officers, 104 enlisted men
- Armament: 1 × single 3"/50 caliber gun mount (removed prior to the picture above); 8 × 40 mm guns, two twin mounts and four single mounts; 12 × 20 mm guns (removed prior to the picture above); 2 x Mk51 firecontrol directors

USS Snohomish County (LST-1126) was an LST-542-class tank landing ship built for the United States Navy during World War II. Named after Snohomish County, Washington, she was the only U.S. naval vessel to bear the name.

LST-1126 was laid down on 16 November 1944 at Seneca, Illinois by the Chicago Bridge & Iron Company; launched on 9 February 1945; and commissioned on 28 February 1945.

== Service history ==
=== World War II, 1945–1960 ===
Between 1945 and 1960, LST-1126 deployed to the western Pacific eight times. Her first tour of duty there came in April 1945, when she departed New Orleans, transited the Panama Canal, stopped at San Diego, Seattle and Pearl Harbor, before continuing westward. As she continued her voyage, she visited Eniwetok Atoll; Apra Harbor, Guam; Saipan; and Okinawa. In late September, she joined the post-World War II occupation forces in China.

Operating off the west coast of the United States out of San Diego when not in the western Pacific, LST-1126 returned to the Far East in 1948, 1953, during the winters of 1945–55, 1957, 1958 and 1959–60. The ship also made three Distant Early Warning Line re-supply runs to Alaska in 1949, 1950, and 1953.

On 1 July 1955, just after her return from her fourth deployment to the western Pacific, the ship was renamed USS Snohomish County (LST-1126).

The permanent assignment of an LST squadron to United States Fleet Activities Yokosuka, Japan, made the 1959-60 deployment Snohomish County's last until the escalation of the Vietnam War. Until 1964, she operated out of San Diego and made two Mid-Pac cruises in 1961 and 1962. The second cruise was in support of Operation Dominic, a series of nuclear tests. Upon completion of this assignment, she returned to normal operations along the Pacific coast.

=== Vietnam War, 1965–1970 ===
In 1965, the American buildup in South Vietnam began in earnest. Accordingly, the need for support ships grew, and Snohomish County returned to the Far East once more. She drew normal tours of duty (five to seven months at a time) in 1965, 1966, and 1967.

In July 1965 Snohomish County, was permanently assigned to support Coast Guard Squadron One Division 12 at Da Nang. On 16 July the ships of Division 12 formed around Snohomish County in U.S. Naval Base Subic Bay, Philippines for the transit to Da Nang where they arrived at 07:00 on 20 July 1965.

In 1968, she was sent on an extended deployment which did not end until the spring of 1970, just before her decommissioning. On each of these last deployments, the ship made the circuit from Japan to South Vietnam to Subic Bay. For the most part, she hauled men and supplies from American bases in Japan and the Philippines to South Vietnam; though, on occasion, she received other assignments, notably one with the Mobile Riverine Force in 1968. There were also ports-of-call such as Hong Kong and Keelung and Kaohsiung, Taiwan. Snohomish County resumed normal operations, exercises, drills, and upkeep in and around San Diego when not deployed to the Far East.

On 22 April 1970, Snohomish County returned to her WestPac homeport, Apra Harbor, Guam, and went through an inspection and survey. She was declared unfit for further naval service. On 1 July 1970, she decommissioned at Naval Station, Guam, and her name was struck from the Navy List. In January 1971, her hulk was sold to Chin Ho Fa Steel and Iron Co., Ltd., of Taiwan for scrapping.

Snohomish County earned eight battle stars for the Vietnam War.
