= USCGC Point Caution =

United States Coast Guard cutter

History

United States
- Name: USCGC Point Caution (WPB-82301)
- Namesake: Point Caution, Alaska; Point Caution, Washington
- Owner: United States Coast Guard
- Builder: Coast Guard Yard, Curtis Bay, Maryland
- Commissioned: 5 October 1960
- Decommissioned: 29 April 1970
- Honors and awards: Presidential Unit Citation (Navy); Navy Unit Commendation; Meritorious Unit Commendation (Navy); Vietnam Service Medal with 2 silver and 1 bronze service stars
- Fate: Transferred to Republic of Vietnam Navy as RVNS Nguyễn An (HQ-716), 29 April 1970

General characteristics
- Type: Patrol Boat (WPB)
- Displacement: 60 tons
- Length: 82 ft 10 in (25.25 m)
- Beam: 17 ft 7 in (5.36 m) max
- Draft: 5 ft 11 in (1.80 m)
- Propulsion: 2 × 600 hp (447 kW) Cummins diesel engines
- Speed: 16.8 knots (31.1 km/h; 19.3 mph)
- Range: 577 nmi (1,069 km) at 14.5 kn (26.9 km/h; 16.7 mph); 1,271 nmi (2,354 km) at 10.7 kn (19.8 km/h; 12.3 mph)
- Complement: Domestic service : 8 men; Vietnam service : 2 officers, 8 men
- Armor: 1960; 1 × Oerlikon 20 mm cannon; Vietnam service; 5 × M2 Browning machine guns; 1 × 81 mm M29 mortar

USCGC Point Caution (WPB-82301) was the first 82-foot (25 m) USCG Point class cutter constructed at the Coast Guard Yard at Curtis Bay, Maryland. She was built and commissioned in 1960 for use as a law enforcement and search and rescue patrol boat. Since the Coast Guard policy in 1960 was not to name cutters under 100 feet (30 m) in length it was designated as WPB-82301 when commissioned and acquired the name Point Caution in January 1964 when the Coast Guard started naming all cutters longer than 65-foot (20 m).

== Construction and design details ==
Point Caution was built to accommodate an 8-man crew. She was powered by two 600 hp (447 kW) VT600 Cummins diesel main drive engines and had two five-bladed 42 in (1.1 m) propellers. The main drive engines were later replaced by 800 hp (597 kW) VT800 Cummins engines. Water tank capacity was 1,550 U.S. gallons (5,900 L) and fuel tank capacity was 1,840 U.S. gallons (7,000 L) at 95% full. Engine exhaust was ported through the transom rather than through a conventional stack and this permitted a 360 degree view from the bridge; a feature that was very useful in search and rescue work as well as a combat environment.

The design specifications for Point Caution included a steel hull for durability and an aluminum superstructure and longitudinally framed construction was used to save weight. Ease of operation with a small crew size was possible because of the non-manned main drive engine spaces. Controls and alarms located on the bridge allowed one man operation of the cutter thus eliminating a live engineer watch in the engine room. Because of design, four men could operate the cutter; however, the need for resting watchstanders brought the crew size to eight men for normal domestic service. The screws were designed for ease of replacement and could be changed without removing the cutter from the water. A clutch-in idle speed of three knots helped to conserve fuel on lengthy patrols and an eighteen knot maximum speed could get the cutter on scene quickly. Air-conditioned interior spaces were a part of the original design for the Point class cutter. Interior access to the deckhouse was through a watertight door on the starboard side aft of the deckhouse. The deckhouse contained the cabin for the officer-in-charge and the executive petty officer. The deckhouse also included a small arms locker, scuttlebutt, a small desk and head. Access to the lower deck and engine room was down a ladder. At the bottom of the ladder was the galley, mess and recreation deck. A watertight door at the front of the mess bulkhead led to the main crew quarters which was ten feet long and included six bunks that could be stowed, three bunks on each side. Forward of the bunks was the crew's head complete with a compact sink, shower and commode. Accommodations for a 13-man crew were installed for Vietnam service.

== History ==
After delivery in 1960, Point Caution was assigned a homeport of Galveston, Texas, where she served as a law enforcement and search and rescue patrol boat.

At the request of the United States Navy, in April 1965, she was alerted for service in South Vietnam and assigned to Coast Guard Squadron One in support of Operation Market Time along with 16 other Point class cutters. While the crew completed overseas training and weapons qualifications at Coast Guard Island and Camp Parks, California, Point Caution was loaded onto a merchant ship, and transported to Subic Bay, Philippines in May 1965 where she was refitted for combat service. Shipyard modifications included installation of new single-sideband radio equipment, additional floodlights, small arms lockers, additional sound-powered phone circuits, and the addition of four M2 machine guns. The original bow-mounted machine gun was replaced with a combination over-under .50 caliber machine gun/81mm trigger-fired mortar that had been developed by the Coast Guard for service in Vietnam. For service in Vietnam, two officers were added to the crew complement to add seniority to the crew in the mission of interdicting vessels at sea.

Point Caution was assigned to Division 12 of Squadron One to be based at Da Nang, along with USCGC Point Arden, USCGC Point Dume, USCGC Point Ellis, USCGC Point Gammon,USCGC Point Orient and USCGC Point Welcome. After sea trials, the Division left Subic Bay for Da Nang on 16 July 1965 in the company of USS Snohomish County, their temporary support ship. After almost two weeks at sea, they arrived at their new duty station on 20 July and began patrolling the coastal waters near Da Nang. Duty consisted of boarding Vietnamese junks to search for contraband weapons and ammunition and check the identification papers of persons on board. Permanent engineering and logistic support of Division 12 was provided by a U.S. Navy non-self-propelled floating workshop, YR-71. During this time, the WPB's were directed to paint the hulls and superstructures formula 20 deck gray to cover the stateside white paint. This increased the effectiveness of night patrols.

On 29 April 1970, Point Caution was turned over to the Republic of Vietnam Navy as part of the Vietnamization of the war effort and recommissioned as RVNS Nguyễn An (HQ-716).

== Notes ==
=== Bibliography ===
- Cutler, Thomas J. (2000). Br own Water, Black Berets: Coastal and Riverine Warfare in Vietnam. Naval Institute Press, Annapolis. ISBN 978-1-55750-196-7.
- Larzelere, Alex (1997). The Coast Guard at War, Vietnam, 1965–1975. Naval Institute Press, Annapolis. ISBN 978-1-55750-529-3.
- Scheina, Robert L. (1990). U.S. Coast Guard Cutters & Craft, 1946–1990. Naval Institute Press, Annapolis. ISBN 978-0-87021-719-7.
- Scotti, Paul C. (2000). Coast Guard Action in Vietnam: Stories of Those Who Served. Hellgate Press, Central Point, OR. ISBN 978-1-55571-528-1.
- Wells II, William R. (August 1997). "The United States Coast Guard's Piggyback 81mm Mortar/.50 cal. machine gun". Vietnam Magazine.
