= USCGC Point Ellis =

United States Coast Guard cutter

History

United States
- Name: USCGC Point Ellis (WPB-82330)
- Namesake: Point Ellis, on Kuiu Island, Alaska
- Owner: United States Coast Guard
- Builder: Coast Guard Yard, Curtis Bay, Maryland
- Commissioned: 28 February 1962
- Decommissioned: 9 December 1969
- Honors and awards: Navy Unit Commendation; Vietnam Service Medal with 2 silver and 1 bronze service stars
- Fate: Transferred to Republic of Vietnam Navy as RVNS Lê Ngọc Thanh (HQ-705), 9 December 1969

General characteristics
- Type: Patrol Boat (WPB)
- Displacement: 60 tons
- Length: 82 ft 10 in (25.25 m)
- Beam: 17 ft 7 in (5.36 m) max
- Draft: 5 ft 11 in (1.80 m)
- Propulsion: 2 × 600 hp (447 kW) Cummins diesel engines
- Speed: 16.8 knots (31.1 km/h; 19.3 mph)
- Range: 577 nmi (1,069 km) at 14.5 kn (26.9 km/h; 16.7 mph); 1,271 nmi (2,354 km) at 10.7 kn (19.8 km/h; 12.3 mph)
- Complement: Domestic service : 8 men; Vietnam service : 2 officers, 8 men
- Armament: 1962; 1 × Oerlikon 20 mm cannon; Vietnam service; 5 × M2 Browning machine guns; 1 × 81 mm M29 mortar

USCGC Point Ellis (WPB-82330) was an 82-foot (25 m) Point class cutter constructed at the Coast Guard Yard at Curtis Bay, Maryland in 1962 for use as a law enforcement and search and rescue patrol boat. Since the Coast Guard policy in 1962 was not to name cutters under 100 feet (30 m) in length, it was designated as WPB-82330 when commissioned and acquired the name Point Ellis in January 1964 when the Coast Guard started naming all cutters longer than 65 feet (20 m).

== Construction and design details ==
Point Ellis was built to accommodate an 8-man crew. She was powered by two 600 hp (447 kW) VT600 Cummins diesel main drive engines and had two five-bladed 42 in (1.1 m) propellers. The main drive engines were later replaced by 800 hp (597 kW) VT800 Cummins engines. Water tank capacity was 1,550 U.S. gallons (5,900 L) and fuel tank capacity was 1,840 U.S. gallons (7,000 L) at 95% full. Engine exhaust was ported through the transom rather than through a conventional stack and this permitted a 360 degree view from the bridge; a feature that was very useful in search and rescue work as well as a combat environment.

The design specifications for Point Ellis included a steel hull for durability and an aluminum superstructure and longitudinally framed construction was used to save weight. Ease of operation with a small crew size was possible because of the non-manned main drive engine spaces. Controls and alarms located on the bridge allowed one man operation of the cutter thus eliminating a live engineer watch in the engine room. Because of design, four men could operate the cutter; however, the need for resting watchstanders brought the crew size to eight men for normal domestic service. The screws were designed for ease of replacement and could be changed without removing the cutter from the water. A clutch-in idle speed of three knots helped to conserve fuel on lengthy patrols and an eighteen knot maximum speed could get the cutter on scene quickly. Air-conditioned interior spaces were a part of the original design for the Point class cutter. Interior access to the deckhouse was through a watertight door on the starboard side aft of the deckhouse. The deckhouse contained the cabin for the officer-in-charge and the executive petty officer. The deckhouse also included a small arms locker, scuttlebutt, a small desk and head. Access to the lower deck and engine room was down a ladder. At the bottom of the ladder was the galley, mess and recreation deck. A watertight door at the front of the mess bulkhead led to the main crew quarters which was ten feet long and included six bunks that could be stowed, three bunks on each side. Forward of the bunks was the crew's head complete with a compact sink, shower and commode. Accommodations for a 13-man crew were installed for Vietnam service.

== History ==
After delivery in 1962, Point Ellis was assigned a homeport of Port Townsend, Washington, where she served as a law enforcement and search and rescue patrol boat.

At the request of the United States Navy, in April 1965, she was alerted for service in South Vietnam and assigned to Coast Guard Squadron One in support of Operation Market Time along with 16 other Point class cutters. While the crew completed overseas training and weapons qualifications at Coast Guard Island and Camp Parks, California, Point Ellis was loaded onto a merchant ship, and transported to Subic Bay, Philippines in May 1965 where she was refitted for combat service. Shipyard modifications included installation of new single-sideband radio equipment, additional floodlights, small arms lockers, additional sound-powered phone circuits, and the addition of four M2 machine guns. The original bow mounted machine gun was replaced with a combination over-under .50 caliber machine gun/81mm trigger fired mortar that had been developed by the Coast Guard for service in Vietnam. For service in Vietnam, two officers were added to the crew complement to add seniority to the crew in the mission of interdicting vessels at sea.

Point Ellis was assigned to Division 12 of Squadron One to be based at Da Nang, along with USCGC Point Arden, USCGC Point Caution, USCGC Point Dume, USCGC Point Gammon, USCGC Point Orient and USCGC Point Welcome. After sea trials, the Division left Subic Bay for Da Nang on 16 July 1965 in the company of USS Snohomish County (LST-1125), their temporary support ship. After almost two weeks at sea, they arrived at their new duty station on 20 July and began patrolling the coastal waters near Da Nang. Duty consisted of boarding Vietnamese junks to search for contraband weapons and ammunition and check the identification papers of persons on board. Permanent engineering and logistic support of Division 12 was provided by a U.S. Navy non-self-propelled floating workshop, YR-71. During this time, the WPB's were directed to paint the hulls and superstructures formula 20 deck gray to cover the stateside white paint. This increased the effectiveness of night patrols.

On 5 February 1966 Point Ellis attempted to board a junk and the five man crew beached the craft and fled the scene. A landing party from Point Ellis went after them and managed to capture one along with identification papers and belongings of the others. This type of landing party action was seen by the commander of Squadron One as too hazardous and orders were issued not to pursue fleeing Viet Cong (VC) suspects through the surf.

While on patrol on 8 December 1966, Point Ellis came across a non-motorized fishing boat with two very frightened men aboard that had been blown by tropical storms away from Hainan Island, part of the People's Republic of China. The Law of the Sea required their rescue and they were returned to their homeland through diplomatic channels.

On 14 March 1967, she detected an enemy steel-hulled trawler and forced it to beach. The VC crew was forced to scuttle the trawler and destroy its cargo of mortars, small arms, uniforms and other contraband. In May of the same year the cutter's Vietnamese liaison officer and a crewman from the Point Ellis went into the water to recover a sailor lost overboard from the USS Princeton.

On 9 December 1969, Point Ellis was turned over to the Republic of Vietnam Navy as part of the Vietnamization of the war effort and recommissioned as Lê Ngọc Thanh.
