= List of ships of the Republic of Vietnam Navy =

This list of ships of the Republic of Vietnam Navy, commonly known as the Vietnam Navy (VNN), includes all ships commissioned into service from its foundation in 1955, until its dissolution in 1975.

== Hull numbers ==
All VNN ship hull numbers began with the letters HQ (Hải quân, "Navy") followed by a number. Note that six patrol craft were designated HQ-01 to HQ-06, while two destroyer escorts and four high endurance cutters were designated HQ-1 to HQ-6. Also the designation HQ-225 was used twice, first for the LSSL Nguyen Van Tru from 1954 until 1957, and after it was broken up for spare parts was given to the LSSL Nỏ Thần, later renamed Nguyen Van Tru in 1970.

== Patrol craft ==
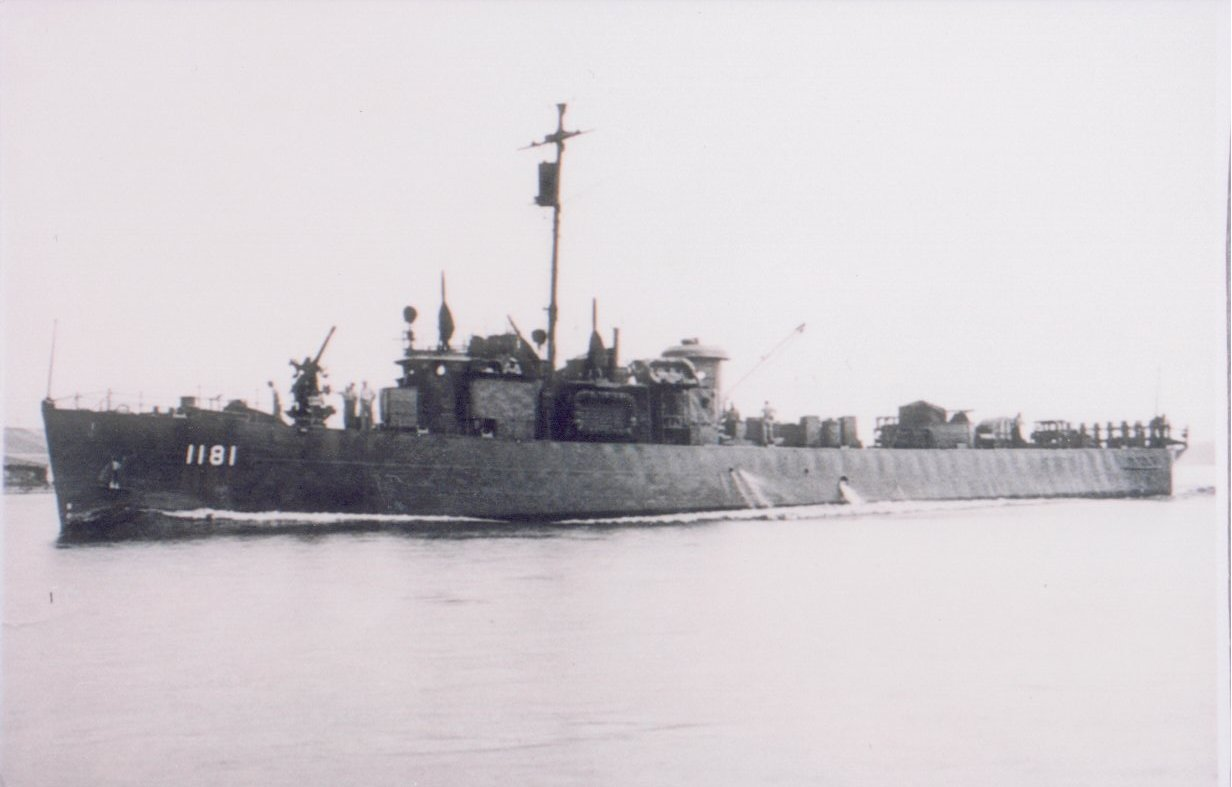
A typical vessel of the PC-461-class

These PC-461-class submarine chasers were 280 ton, 174-foot (53 m) vessels, with a crew of 65. They had a top speed of 20.2 knots (37.4 km/h; 23.2 mph). The main armament was one 3"/50 caliber gun, along with 40 mm and 20 mm guns.

Name	Acquired	Formerly	Fate
RVNS Chi Lăng (HQ-01)	Unknown	USS PC-1144	Scrapped 1961.
RVNS Đống Đa (HQ-02)	Unknown	USS PC-1130	Scrapped 1961.
RVNS Vạn Kiếp (HQ-03)	Unknown	USS PC-1167	Scrapped 1965.
RVNS Tuy Dong (HQ-04)	January 1956	USS PC-1143	Scrapped 1971.
RVNS Tay Cây (HQ-05)	Unknown	USS PC-1146	Scrapped 1965.
RVNS Van Don (HQ-06)	23 November 1960	USS Anacortes (PC-1569)	Scrapped 1974.

== Destroyer escort ==
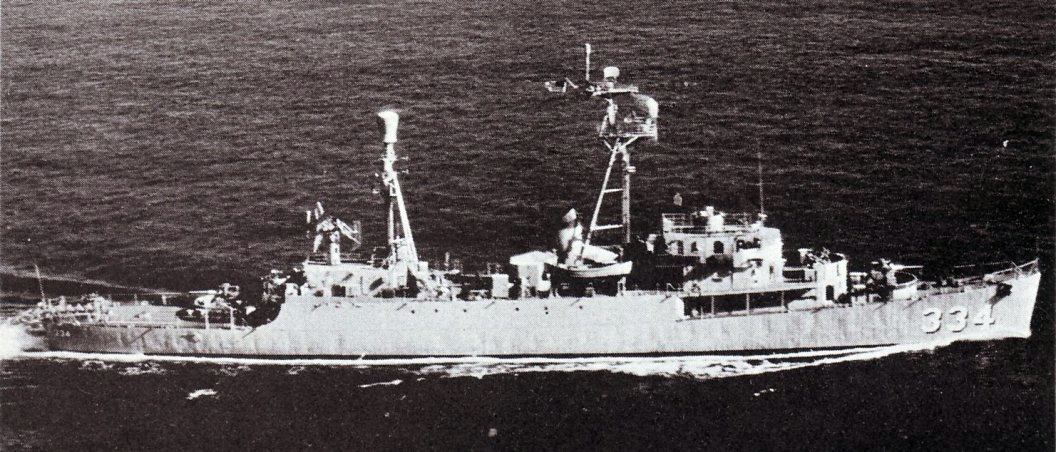
USS Forster (DE-334), later RVNS Trần Khánh Dư (HQ-4)

The Edsall-class destroyer escort was a 1,253-ton, 306-foot (93 m) vessel, with a crew of 186. It had a top speed of 21 knots (39 km/h; 24 mph) and a range of 10,800 nmi (20,000 km; 12,400 mi). The main armament was three 3"/50 caliber guns, along with torpedo tubes, depth charges, and 40 mm and 20 mm guns.

Name	Acquired	Formerly	Fate
RVNS Trần Hưng Đạo (HQ-1)	13 February 1971	USS Camp (DE-251)	Escaped to the Philippines, April 1975. To Philippine Navy as BRP Rajah Lakandula (PS-4).
RVNS Trần Khánh Dư (HQ-4)	25 September 1971	USS Forster (DE-334)	Captured by North Vietnam, 29 April 1975. To Vietnam People's Navy as VPNS Dai Ky (HQ-03).

== Frigate ==
VNN Frigates Trần Quang Khải (HQ-2) (left), Tran Quoc Toan (HQ-6) (center), and Tran Binh Trong (HQ-5) (right)

Originally built as Barnegat-class seaplane tenders for the U.S. Navy, these 2,040 ton, 310-foot (94 m) vessels were transferred to the Coast Guard after World War II, and reclassified as Casco-class cutters. With a crew of 151, they had a top speed of 18 knots (33 km/h; 21 mph) and a range of 20,000 nmi (37,000 km; 23,000 mi). The main armament was a single 5"/38 caliber gun. In Vietnamese service they were classified as frigates.

Name	Acquired	Formerly	Fate
RVNS Trần Quang Khải (HQ-02)	1 January 1971	USCGC Bering Strait (WAVP-382)	Escaped to the Philippines, April 1975. To Philippine Navy as BRP Diego Silang (PF-9).
RVNS Trần Nhật Duật (HQ-03)	1 January 1971	USCGC Yakutat (WAVP-380)	Escaped to the Philippines, April 1975. To Philippine Navy and cannibalized for spare parts.
RVNS Trần Bình Trọng (HQ-05)	21 December 1971	USCGC Castle Rock (WAVP-383)	Escaped to the Philippines, April 1975. To Philippine Navy as BRP Francisco Dagohoy (PF-10).
RVNS Trần Quốc Toản (HQ-06)	21 December 1971	USCGC Cook Inlet (WAVP-384)	Escaped to the Philippines, April 1975. To Philippine Navy and cannibalized for spare parts.
RVNS Phạm Ngũ Lão (HQ-15)	15 July 1972	USCGC Absecon (WAVP-374)	Captured by North Vietnam, 1975. To Vietnam People's Navy as PRVSN Phạm Ngũ Lão (HQ-01).
RVNS Lý Thường Kiệt (HQ-16)	21 June 1972	USCGC Chincoteague (WAVP-375)	Escaped to the Philippines, April 1975. To Philippine Navy as BRP Andrés Bonifacio (PF-7).
RVNS Ngô Quyền (HQ-17)	21 June 1972	USCGC McCulloch (WAVP-386)	Escaped to the Philippines, April 1975. To Philippine Navy as BRP Gregorio del Pilar (PF-8).

== Patrol craft escort ==
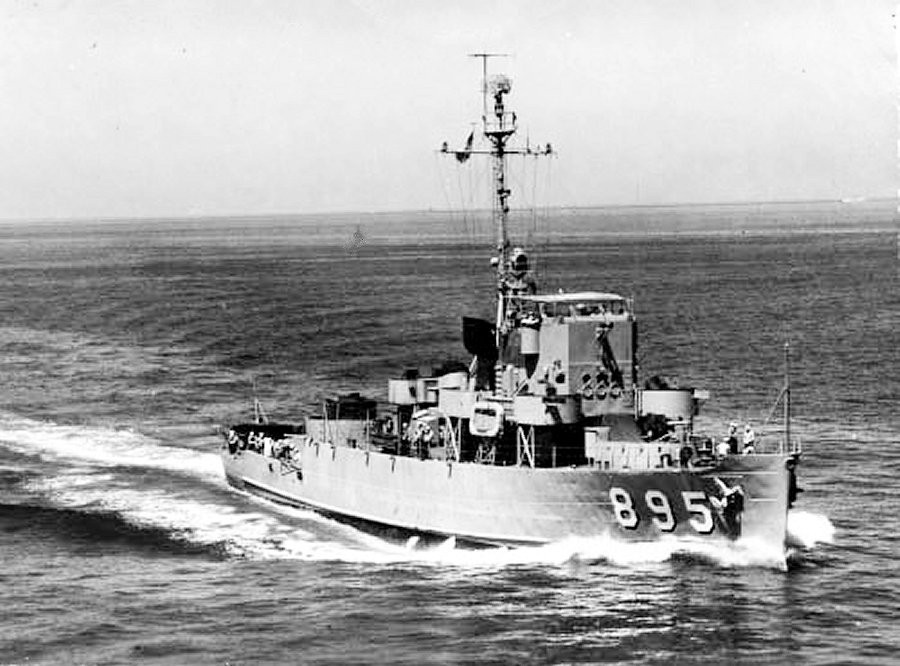
USS PCE-895, later RVNS Đống Đa II (HQ-07)

The Patrol Craft Escorts were 903 ton, 184-foot (56 m) vessels. With a crew of 99, they had a top speed of 15.7 knots (29.1 km/h; 18.1 mph). The main armament was a single 3"/50 caliber gun, along with 40 mm guns, and depth charges.

Name	Acquired	Formerly	Fate
RVNS Đống Đa II (HQ-07)	29 November 1961	USS Crestview (PCE-895)	Escaped to the Philippines, April 1975. To Philippine Navy as BRP Sultan Kudarat (PS-22).
RVNS Ngọc Hồi (HQ-12)	11 July 1966	USS Brattleboro (PCE(R)-852)	Escaped to the Philippines, April 1975. To Philippine Navy as BRP Miguel Malvar (PS-19).
RVNS Van Kiếp II (HQ-14)	1970	USS Amherst (PCE(R)-853)	Escaped to the Philippines, April 1975. To Philippine Navy as BRP Datu Marikudo (PS-23).

== Minesweeper ==
=== Fleet minesweeper ===
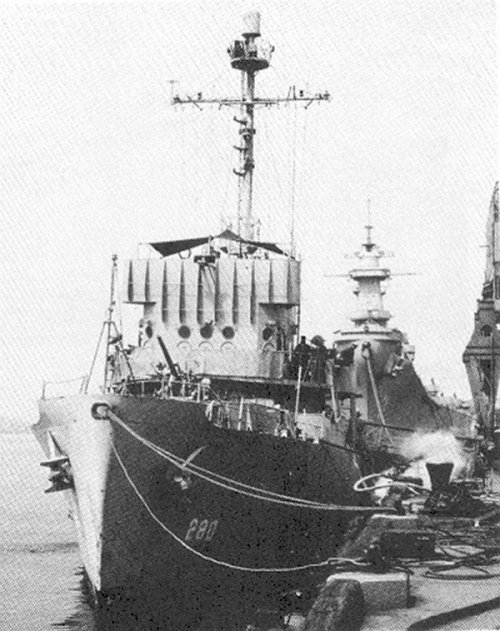
USS Prowess (AM-280), later RVNS Hà Hồi (HQ-13)

The Admirable-class minesweepers were 625 ton, 184-foot (56 m) ships. With a crew of 104, they had a top speed of 15 knots (28 km/h; 17 mph). The main armament was a single 3"/50 caliber gun, along with 40 mm guns, and depth charges.

Name	Acquired	Formerly	Fate
RVNS Chi Lăng II (HQ-08)	17 April 1962	USS Gayety (AM-239)	Escaped to the Philippines, April 1975. To Philippine Navy as BRP Magat Salamat (PS-20).
RVNS Kỳ Hòa (HQ-09)	21 August 1962	USS Sentry (AM-299)	Believed captured by North Vietnam, 1975.
RVNS Nhựt Tảo (HQ-10)	24 January 1964	USS Serene (AM-300)	Sunk in the Battle of the Paracel Islands, 19 January 1974.
RVNS Chí Linh (HQ-11)	24 January 1964	USS Shelter (AM-301)	Escaped to the Philippines, April 1975. To Philippine Navy as BRP Datu Tupas (PS-18).
RVNS Hà Hồi (HQ-13)	4 June 1970	USS Prowess (AM-280)	Captured by North Vietnam, 29 April 1975. To Vietnam People's Navy.

=== Harbor minesweeper ===
The YMS-1-class auxiliary motor minesweepers were 270 ton, 136-foot (41 m) vessels. With a crew of 32, they had a top speed of 15 knots (28 km/h; 17 mph). The main armament was a single 3"/50 caliber gun, along with 20 mm guns, and depth charges.

Name	Acquired	Formerly	Fate
RVNS Hàm Tử (HQ-111)	12 February 1954	USS YMS-28	Scrapped 1958.
RVNS Chương Dương (HQ-112)	11 February 1954	USS YMS-83	Scrapped 1964.
RVNS Bạch Đằng (HQ-113)	11 February 1954	USS YMS-78	Scrapped 1963.

=== Coastal minesweeper ===
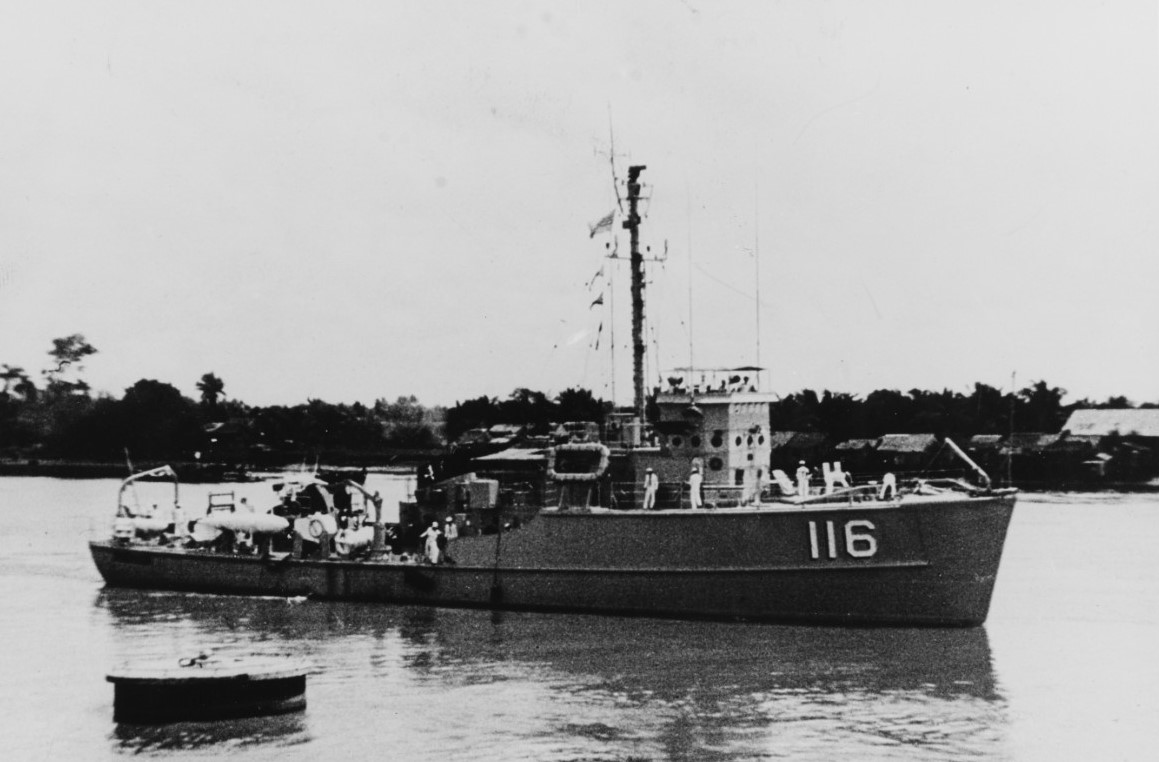
Bạch Đằng II (HQ-116)

These vessels were built for South Vietnam by Stephens Brothers, Inc., Stockton, California, and were assigned hull numbers, but not commissioned into the United States Navy. They were 370 ton, 152-foot (46 m) vessels. With a crew of 38, they had a top speed of 14 knots (26 km/h; 16 mph). Their only armament was two 20 mm guns.

Name	Acquired	Formerly	Fate
RVNS Hàm Tử II (HQ-114)	26 June 1959	MSC-281	Scrapped 1974.
RVNS Chương Dương II (HQ-115)	21 August 1959	MSC-282	Scrapped 1974.
RVNS Bạch Đằng II (HQ-116)	18 September 1959	MSC-283	Scrapped 1970.

=== Motor Launch Minesweeper ===
The motor launch minesweeper (MLMS) was a 40 to 60 foot motor launch fitted with basic minesweeping equipment suitable for clearing river channels and harbours.

Name	Acquired	Formerly	Fate
RVNS HQ-150	?	?	?
RVNS HQ-151	?	?	?
RVNS HQ-152	?	?	?
RVNS HQ-153	?	?	?
RVNS HQ-154	?	?	?
RVNS HQ-155	?	?	?
RVNS HQ-156	?	?	?
RVNS HQ-157	?	?	?
RVNS HQ-158	?	?	?
RVNS HQ-159	?	?	?
RVNS HQ-160	?	?	?
RVNS HQ-161	?	?	?

== Landing Ship Support Large ==
The Landing Ship Support (Large) (LSSL) were 250 ton, 158-foot (48 m) amphibious assault ships primarily used to provide close fire support for troops. With a crew of 71, they had a top speed of 16.5 knots (30.6 km/h; 19.0 mph). The main armament was a single 3"/50 caliber gun, along with 40 mm and 20 mm guns, and .50 caliber machine guns.

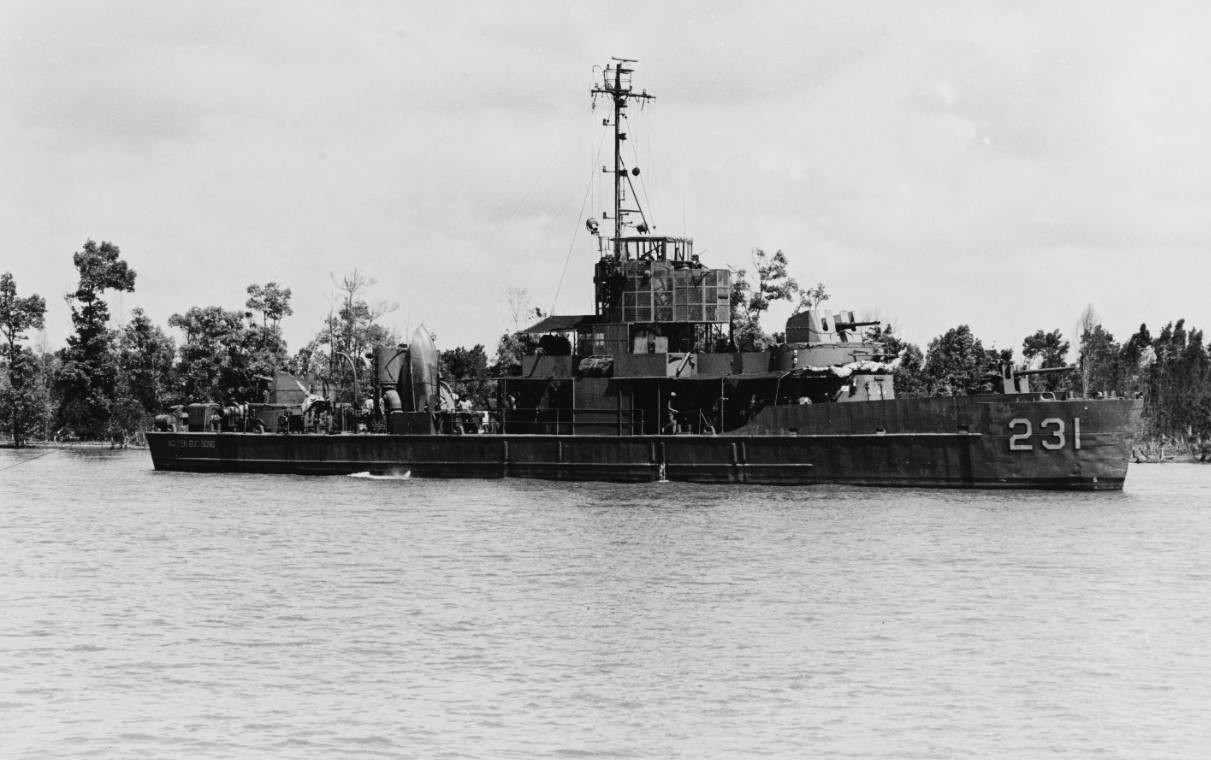
Nguyễn Đức Bóng (HQ-231)

Name	Acquired	Formerly	Fate
RVNS Nguyen Van Tru (HQ-225)	12 October 1954	USS LSSL-2	Transferred to Taiwan for spare parts, 1957.
RVNS No Than (HQ-225)	1957	USS LSSL-105	Renamed Nguyen Van Tru, 1970. Sunk, 30 July 1970.
RVNS Le Trong Dam (HQ-226)	1955	USS LSSL-4	Sunk, 3 October 1970.
RVNS Le Van Binh (HQ-227)	15 September 1956	USS LSSL-10	Sunk, 2 October 1966.
RVNS Đoàn Ngọc Tang (HQ-228)	15 September 1956	USS LSSL-9	Escaped to the Philippines, April 1975. To Philippine Navy as BRP La Union (LF-50).
RVNS Lưu Phú Thọ (HQ-229)	?	USS LSSL-101	Escaped to the Philippines, April 1975. To Philippine Navy and cannibalized for spare parts.
RVNS Nguyễn Ngọc Long (HQ-230)	?	USS LSSL-96	Escaped to the Philippines, April 1975. To Philippine Navy as BRP Sulu (LF-49).
RVNS Nguyễn Đức Bóng (HQ-231)	19 February 1966	USS LSSL-129	Escaped to the Philippines, April 1975. To Philippine Navy as BRP Camarines Sur (LF-48).

USS LSIL-710 was also transferred to South Vietnam in 1956, but its name and number are not recorded.

== Landing Ship Infantry (Large) ==
Landing Ship Infantry (Large) (LSIL) were 234 ton, 158-foot (48 m) amphibious assault ships, designed to land large numbers of troops directly onto beaches. It could transport 188 men and 65 tons of cargo. With a crew of 28, they had a top speed of 16 knots (30 km/h; 18 mph), and a range of 4,000 nmi (7,400 km) at 12 kn (22 km/h). Armament consisted of five single 20 mm guns, with additional .50 caliber machine guns.

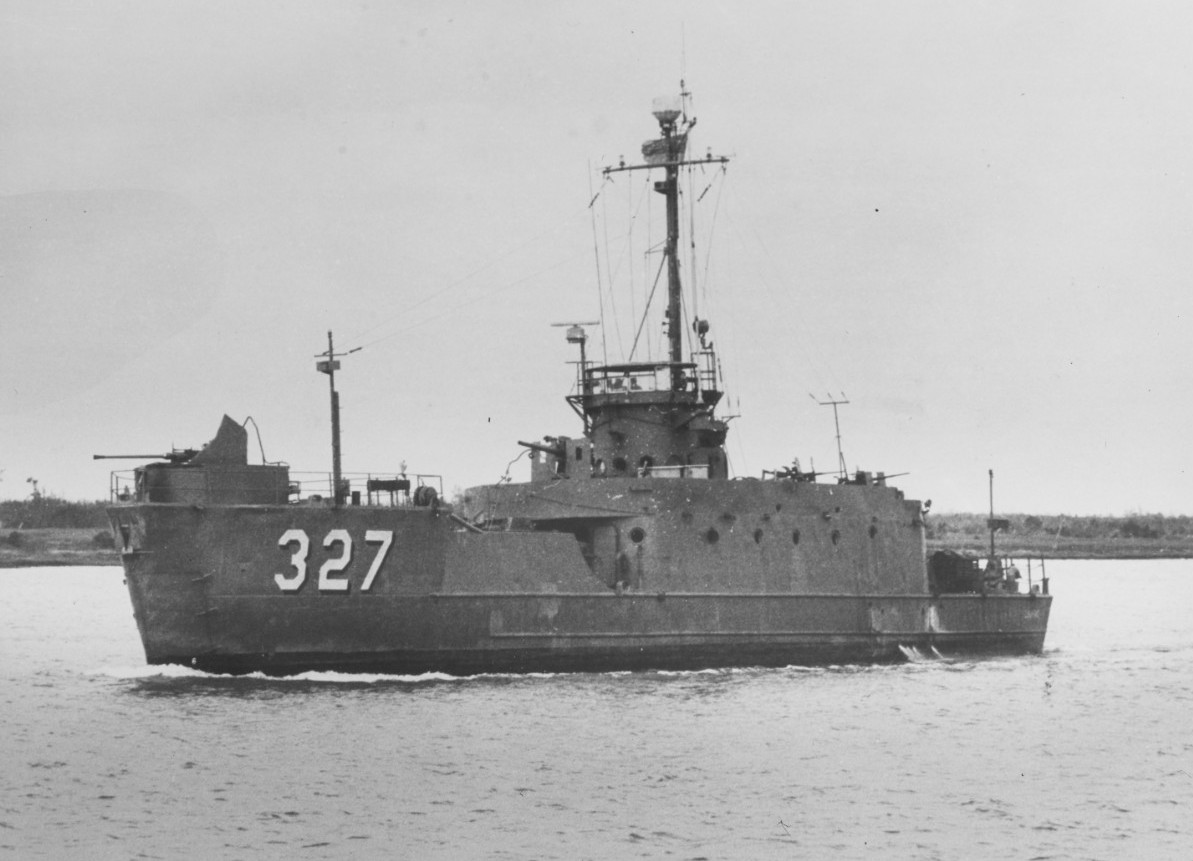
Long Dao (HQ-327)

Name	Acquired	Formerly	Fate
RVNS Long Dao (HQ-327)	?	USS LSI(L)-698	Sunk, 1974.
RVNS Thần Tiên (HQ-328)	1955	USS LSI(L)-702	Sunk, 1974.
RVNS Thiên Kích (HQ-329)	1956	USS LSI(L)-872	Escaped to the Philippines, April 1975. To Philippine Navy.
RVNS Loi Cong (HQ-330)	1956	USS LSI(L)-699	Escaped to the Philippines, April 1975. To Philippine Navy.
RVNS Tam Set (HQ-331)	1956	USS LSI(L)-871	Escaped to the Philippines, April 1975

== Landing Ship Medium - Hospital ==
The LSM-1-class Landing Ship Medium (LSM-H) were amphibious assault ships designed to carry men and vehicles onto a hostile shore. They were 530-ton, 203-foot (62 m) vessels, with a crew of 58, and a top speed of 13.3 knots (24.6 km/h; 15.3 mph). In this case they were modified to act as hospital ships.

Name	Acquired	Formerly	Fate
RVNS Hát Giang (HQ-400)	Unknown	USS LSM-335	Escaped to the Philippines, April 1975. To Philippine Navy as BRP Western Samar (LP-66).
RVNS Hàn Giang (HQ-401)	October 1955	USS LSM-110	Escaped to the Philippines, April 1975. To Philippine Navy and cannibalized for spare parts. Scrapped, 9 June 1976.

== Landing Ship Medium ==
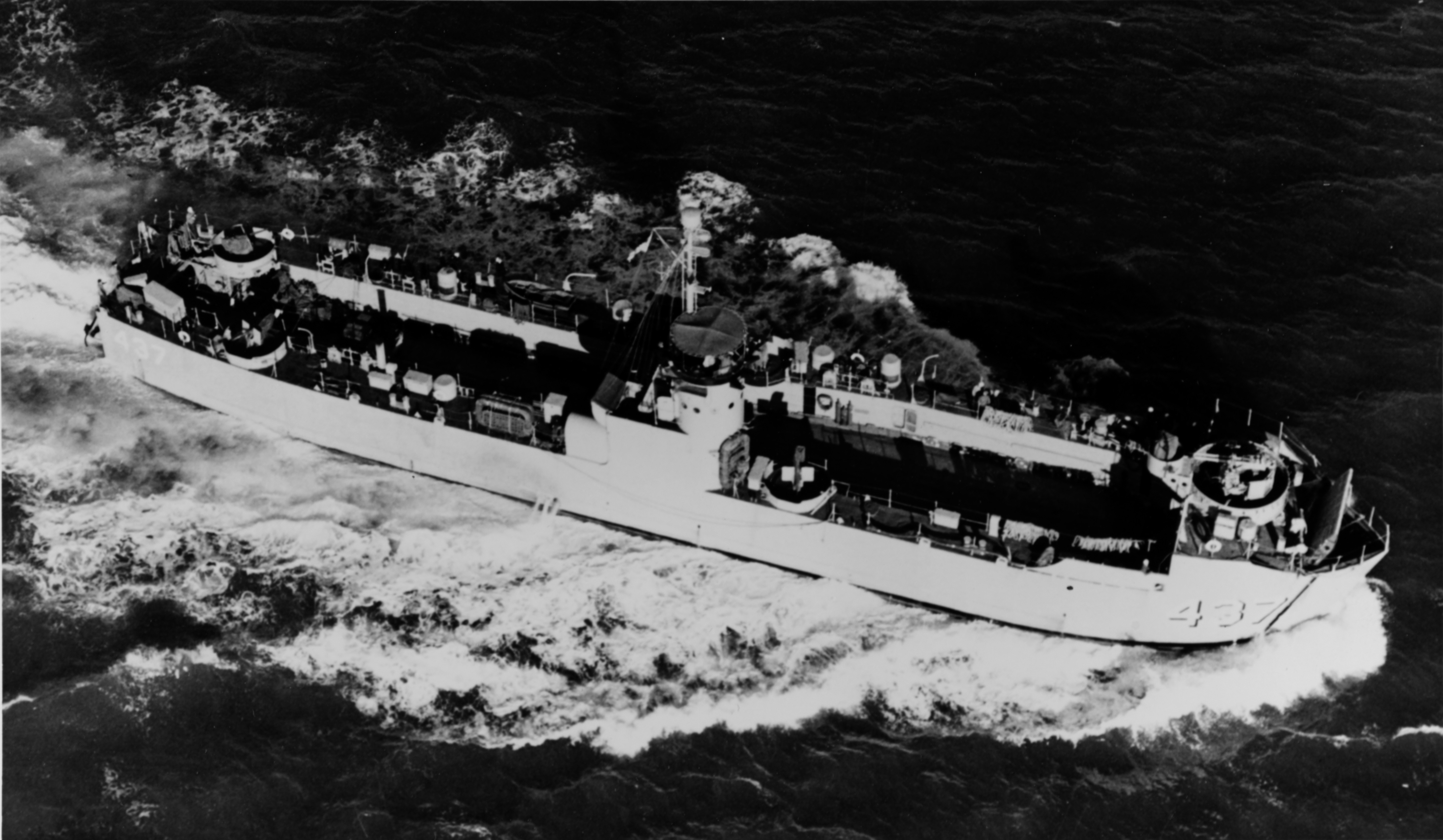
An LSM underway

The LSM-1-class Landing Ship Medium (LSM) were amphibious assault ships designed to carry men and vehicles onto a hostile shore. They were 530 ton, 203-foot (62 m) vessels, with a crew of 58, and a top speed of 13.3 knots (24.6 km/h; 15.3 mph). They were capable of carrying between three and five tanks, and 54 troops. Their armament consisted of two 40 mm guns, and four 20 mm guns.

Name	Acquired	Formerly	Fate
RVNS Lam Giang (HQ-402)	October 1956	USS LSM-226	Scuttled to prevent capture by North Vietnam, 2 May 1975
RVNS Ninh Giang (HQ-403)	October 1956	USS LSM-85	Captured by North Vietnam, 30 April 1975, and to Vietnam People's Navy.
RVNS Hương Giang (HQ-404)	1 August 1961	USS Oceanside (LSM-175)	First South Vietnam Navy Ship was led by South Vietnam Captain Khương Hữu Bá from the US to Saigon unescorted in 1958 and coincidentally was led by Navy Captain Khương to return it to the US Navy in 1975 from the fall of Saigon - Returned to the US Navy Subic Bay - Philippines, April 1975. To Philippine Navy as BRP Batanes (LP-65).
RVNS Tiền Giang (HQ-405)	20 June 1962	USS LSM-313	Captured by North Vietnam, 30 April 1975, and to Vietnam People's Navy. Scrapped 1990.
RVNS Hậu Giang (HQ-406)	?	USS LSM-276	Scuttled May 1975. Raised and to Vietnam People's Navy until 1989.

Two further ships - USS LSM-355 and USS LSM-58 - were also transferred to the VVN, though their names and numbers are unknown.

- USS LSM-58 was transferred to South Vietnam in April 1956, but was returned to U.S. custody on 29 May 1956.
- USS LSM-355 was transferred to South Vietnam in December 1955, escaped to the Philippines on 30 April 1975, and served in the Philippine Navy until 1989.

== Gasoline barge ==
The YOG-5-class self-propelled gasoline barge was a 1,235-ton, 174-foot (53 m) vessel, with a crew of 23.

Name	Acquired	Formerly	Fate
RVNS HQ-470	?	USS YOG-80	Escaped to the Philippines, April 1975.
RVNS HQ-471	?	USS YOG-33	Escaped to the Philippines, April 1975.
RVNS HQ-472	?	USS YOG-67	Unknown.
RVNS HQ-473	?	USS YOG-71	Unknown.
RVNS HQ-474	?	USS YOG-131	Escaped to the Philippines, April 1975.
RVNS HQ-475	?	USS YOG-56	Unknown.

== Water Barge ==
Name	Acquired	Formerly	Fate
RVNS HQ-480	?	?	Sunk in Saigon Naval Shipyard, June 1969

== Refrigerated Covered Lighter ==
This 300 ton, 310-foot (94 m) vessel was used to transport food supplies to floating barracks and bases. They had a crew of 17 and were unarmed.

Name	Acquired	Formerly	Fate
RVNS HQ-490	?	Possibly YFR-889	Unknown.

Note: YFR-889 is one of two of the type deployed to Vietnam according to NavSource. The other, YFR-888, was struck in 1985, and disposed of in 1987, according to the NVR database.

== Landing Ship Tank ==
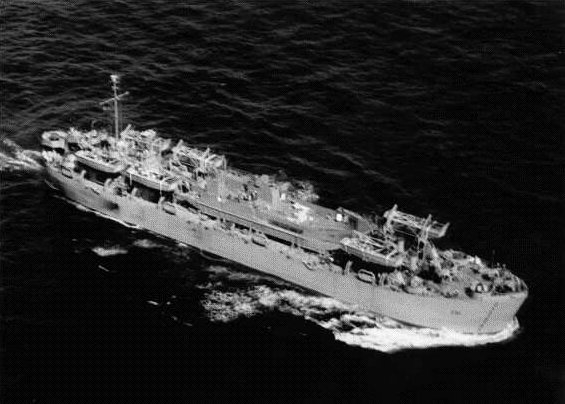
USS Coconino County (LST-603), later RVNS Vung Tau (HQ-503)

The Landing Ship, Tank (LST) was a vessel created to support amphibious operations by landing vehicles, cargo, and troops directly to shore. These 1,625 ton, 327-foot (100 m) vessels had a crew of around 120 men, and a top speed of 12 knots (22 km/h; 14 mph). It could transport 140 troops and between 1,600 and 1,900 tons of cargo in the form of various vehicles, as well as six LCVPs. The main armament was a single 3"/50 caliber gun, along with a number of 40 mm and 20 mm guns, and .50 and .30 caliber machine guns.

Name	Acquired	Formerly	Fate	
RVNS Cam Ranh (HQ-500)	12 April 1962	USS Marion County (LST-975)	Escaped to the Philippines, April 1975. To Philippine Navy as BRP Zamboanga Del Sur (LT-86).	
RVNS Đà Nẵng (HQ-501)	12 July 1962	USS Maricopa County (LST-938)	Captured by North Vietnam, 29 April 1975. To Vietnam People's Navy as PRVS Tran Khanh Du (HQ-501).	Captured by North Vietnam, April 1975
RVNS Thị Nại (HQ-502)	17 December 1963	USS Cayuga County (LST-529)	Escaped to the Philippines, April 1975. To Philippine Navy as BRP Cotabato Del Sur (LT-87).	
RVNS Vũng Tàu (HQ-503)	4 April 1969	USS Coconino County (LST-603)	Captured by North Vietnam, April 1975.	
RVNS Qui Nhơn (HQ-504)	8 April 1970	USS Bulloch County (LST-509)	Unknown.	
RVNS Nha Trang (HQ-505)	April 1970	USS Jerome County (LST-848)	Escaped to the Philippines, April 1975. To Philippine Navy as BRP Agusan Del Sur (LT-54).	

== Landing Craft Utility ==
Landing Craft Utility (LCU) were 314 ton, 119-foot (36 m) amphibious assault ships designed to land tanks on beachheads. They were originally classified as the Mk.6 LCT. With a crew of 13, they had a top speed of 10 knots (19 km/h; 12 mph), and a range of 700 nmi (1,300 km) at 7 kn (13 km/h). They were capable of carrying three or four medium or heavy tanks, or 150 tons of cargo, while armament consisted of two twin 20 mm guns and two .50 caliber machine guns.

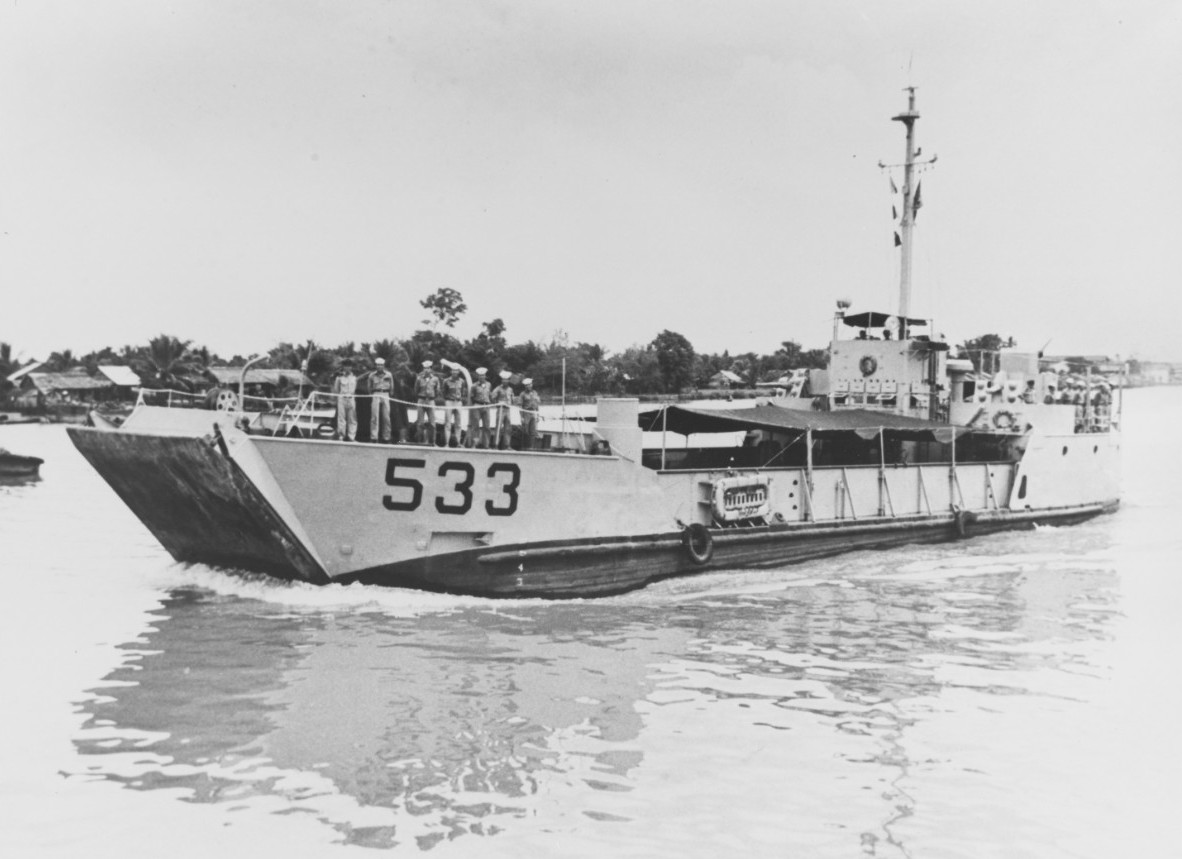
HQ-533

Name	Acquired	Formerly	Fate
RVNS HQ-533	1954	USS LCU-1479	Unknown
RVNS HQ-534	1954	USS LCU-1480	Unknown
RVNS HQ-535	?	?	Unknown
RVNS HQ-536	?	USS LCU-1466	Unknown
RVNS HQ-537	1954	USS LCU-1501	Unknown
RVNS HQ-538	1956	USS LCU-1502	Unknown
RVNS HQ-539	1956	USS LCU-1594	Unknown
RVNS HQ-540	?	USS LCU-1475	Unknown
RVNS HQ-541	?	USS LCU-1477	Unknown
RVNS HQ-542	?	USS LCU-1494	Unknown
RVNS HQ-543	?	USS LCU-1493	Unknown
RVNS HQ-544	?	?	Unknown
RVNS HQ-546	?	USAV LCU-1582	Unknown
RVNS HQ-547	?	USS LCU-1482	Unknown
RVNS HQ-548	?	USS LCU-1498	Unknown
RVNS HQ-549	?	?	

== Harbor Salvage Craft ==
The Salvage Lift Craft, Light (YLLC), was a 400-ton, 119-foot (36 m) salvage craft with a lift capacity of 25 tons, based on the hull of the Mk.6 Tank landing craft. With a crew of 16, it had a top speed of 7 knots (13 km/h; 8.1 mph), and was armed with two .50 caliber machine guns.

Name	Acquired	Formerly	Fate
RVNS HQ-560	?	USS YLLC-1	Unknown
RVNS HQ-561	?	?	Unknown
RVNS HQ-562	?	?	Unknown

== Patrol Gunboat Medium ==
The PGM-9-class gunboats were built in the U.S. and transferred on completion to South Vietnam. They were assigned hull numbers, but not commissioned into the United States Navy. They were 122 ton, 100-foot (30 m) vessels, with a top speed of 17 knots (31 km/h; 20 mph) and armed with one 40 mm gun, two 20 mm guns and an 81 mm mortar.

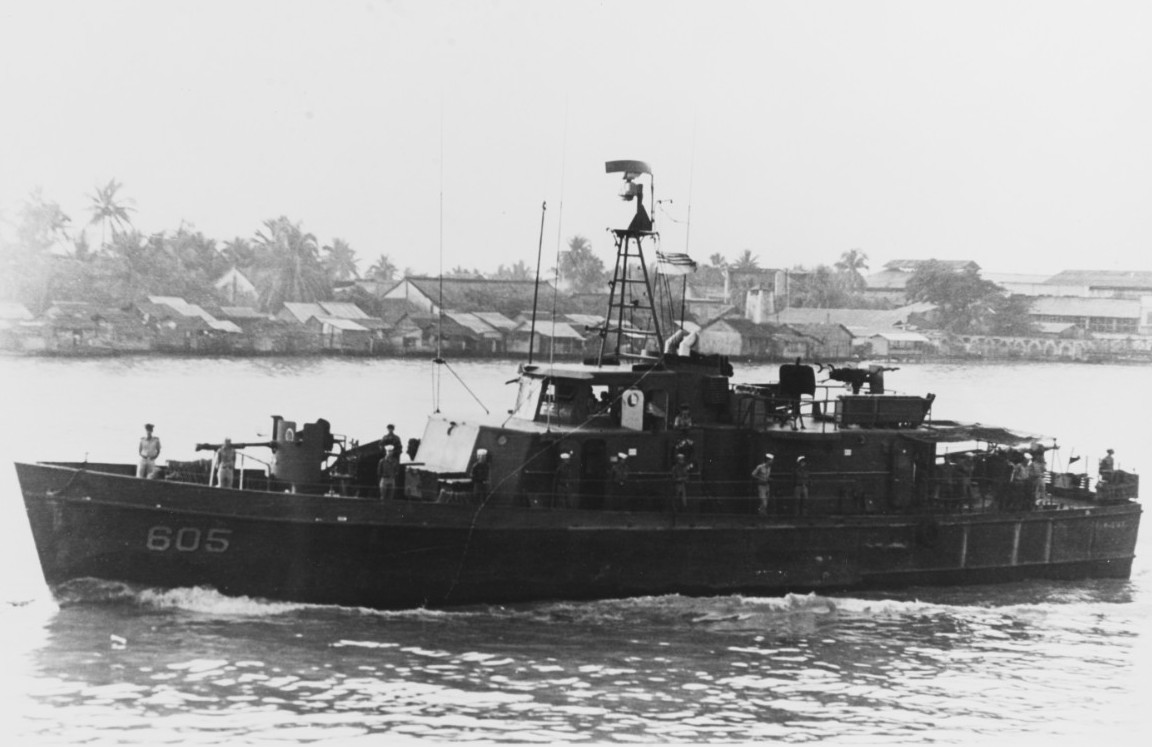
Kim Qui (HQ-605)

Name	Acquired	Formerly	Fate
RVNS Phù Du (HQ-600)	?	PGM-64	Unknown
RVNS Tiền Mới (HQ-601)	?	PGM-65	Unknown
RVNS Minh Hòa (HQ-602)	February 1963	PGM-66	Escaped with HQ-230, HQ-330 and HQ-331 in April 1975, but turned back to Viet Nam, captan Ngo Minh Duong murdered.
RVNS Kiến Vàng (HQ-603)	?	PGM-67	Unknown
RVNS Kéo Ngựa (HQ-604)	?	PGM-68	Destroyed
RVNS Kim Qui (HQ-605)	?	PGM-59	Unknown
RVNS Mây Rút (HQ-606)	?	PGM-60	Unknown
RVNS Nam Du (HQ-607)	?	PGM-61	Unknown
RVNS Hoa Lư (HQ-608)	1 May 1963	PGM-62	Unknown
RVNS Tổ Yến (HQ-609)	?	PGM-63	Unknown
RVNS Duyên Hải (HQ-610)	April 1964	PGM-69	Unknown
RVNS Trường Sa (HQ-611)	?	PGM-70	Unknown
RVNS Thái Bình (HQ-612)	1966	PGM-72	Unknown
RVNS Thi Tự (HQ-613)	?	PGM-73	Unknown
RVNS Song Tự (HQ-614)	?	PGM-74	Unknown
RVNS Tây Sa (HQ-615)	2 June 1966	PGM-80	Unknown
RVNS Hoàng Sa (HQ-616)	?	PGM-82	Unknown
RVNS Phú Quý (HQ-617)	?	PGM-81	Unknown
RVNS Hòn Trọc (HQ-618)	?	PGM-83	Escaped to the Philippines, April 1975, and to Philippine Navy as BRP Basilan (PG-60).
RVNS Tô Châu (HQ-619)	?	PGM-91	Unknown

== Patrol boat ==
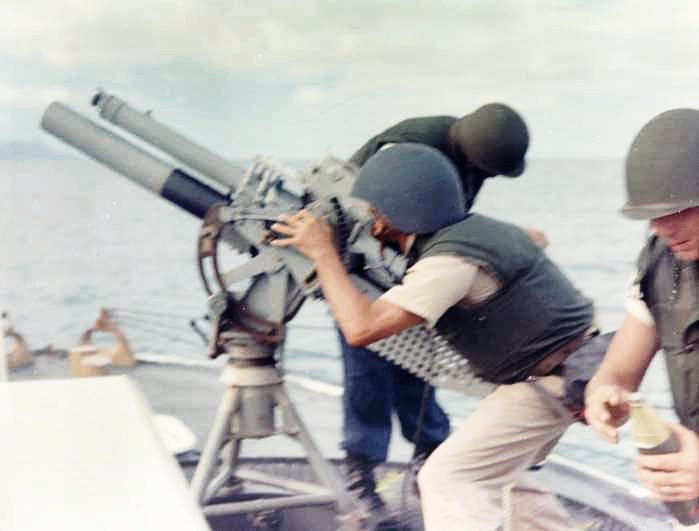
The crew of USCGC Point Comfort (WPB-82317) firing an 81 mm mortar

The Point-class cutter was a 70-ton, 82-foot (25 m) patrol vessel. It had a crew of 10 men, and a top speed of 16.8 knots (31.1 km/h; 19.3 mph). Armament consisted of five M2 Browning machine guns and an 81 mm mortar.

The ships were transferred to the VNN under the United States Coast Guard's SCATTOR (Smallcraft Assets: Training/Turnover Of Resources) program; numerically they were the largest class of the VNN. By 1972, most were in poor condition and mothballed due to lack of fuel and spares. Ngô Văn Quyền (HQ-718) was still active and in good condition when South Vietnam fell in 1975, she was taken into the Vietnam People's Navy and served for many more years. A few other Point-class ships reportedly participated in a final defense of Saigon, firing at North Vietnamese troops from the Saigon River in April 1975. Some may have been damaged or sunk in action. Huỳnh Văn Đức (HQ-702) rendezvoused with other surviving South Vietnamese warships off Côn Sơn Island and fled to the Philippines, and was scrapped there. The rest of the former South Vietnamese fleet was presumably scrapped by Vietnam in the early 1980s.

Name	Acquired	Formerly	Fate
RVNS Lê Phước Đức (HQ-700)	16 May 1969	USCGC Point League (WPB-82304)	Scrapped.
RVNS Lê Văn Ngà (HQ-701)	16 May 1969	USCGC Point Garnet (WPB-82310)	Scrapped.
RVNS Huỳnh Văn Đức (HQ-702)	15 September 1969	USCGC Point Clear (WPB-82315)	Escaped to the Philippines, April 1975. Scrapped Subic Bay, 19 May 1976
RVNS Nguyễn Đao (HQ-703)	11 November 1969	USCGC Point Gammon (WPB-82328)	Scrapped.
RVNS Đào Thức (HQ-704)	17 November 1969	USCGC Point Comfort (WPB-82317)	Scrapped.
RVNS Lê Ngọc Thanh (HQ-705)	9 December 1969	USCGC Point Ellis (WPB-82330)	Scrapped.
RVNS Nguyễn Ngọc Thạch (HQ-706)	11 December 1969	USCGC Point Slocum (WPB-82313)	Scrapped.
RVNS Đặng Văn Hoành (HQ-707)	11 December 1969	USCGC Point Hudson (WPB-82322)	Scrapped.
RVNS Lê Đình Hùng (HQ-708)	12 January 1970	USCGC Point White (WPB-82308)	Scrapped.
RVNS Trường Tiền (HQ-709)	14 February 1970	USCGC Point Dume (WPB-82325)	Scrapped.
RVNS Phạm Ngọc Châu (HQ-710)	14 February 1970	USCGC Point Arden (WPB-82309)	Scrapped.
RVNS Đào Văn Đặng (HQ-711)	14 February 1970	USCGC Point Glover (WPB-82307)	Scrapped.
RVNS Lê Ngọc Ẩn (HQ-712)	21 February 1970	USCGC Point Jefferson (WPB-82306)	Scrapped.
RVNS Huỳnh Văn Ngan (HQ-713)	16 March 1970	USCGC Point Kennedy (WPB-82320)	Scrapped.
RVNS Trần Lo (HQ-714)	16 March 1970	USCGC Point Young (WPB-82303)	Scrapped.
RVNS Bùi Viết Thành (HQ-715)	27 March 1970	USCGC Point Partridge (WPB-82305)	Scrapped.
RVNS Nguyễn An (HQ-716)	29 April 1970	USCGC Point Caution (WPB-82301)	Scrapped.
RVNS Nguyễn Hấn (HQ-717)	29 April 1970	USCGC Point Welcome (WPB-82329)	Scrapped.
RVNS Ngô Văn Quyền (HQ-718)	26 May 1970	USCGC Point Lomas (WPB-82321)	Captured by North Vietnam, 1975. Scrapped Ho Chi Minh City, 1987
RVNS Vân Điền (HQ-719)	26 May 1970	USCGC Point Banks (WPB-82327)	Scrapped.
RVNS Hồ Đăng La (HQ-720)	15 June 1970	USCGC Point Grace (WPB-82323)	Scrapped.
RVNS Đằm Thoại (HQ-721)	15 June 1970	USCGC Point Mast (WPB-82316)	Scrapped.
RVNS Nguyễn Kim Hưng (HQ-722)	14 July 1970	USCGC Point Orient (WPB-82319)	Unknown.
RVNS Huỳnh Bộ (HQ-723)	14 July 1970	USCGC Point Grey (WPB-82324)	Scrapped.
RVNS Hồ Duy (HQ-724)	15 August 1970	USCGC Point Cypress (WPB-82326)	Scrapped.
RVNS Trương Ba (HQ-725)	15 August 1970	USCGC Point Marone (WPB-82331)	Scrapped.

== Patrol Craft Tender ==
These ships were built as LST-542-class tank landing ships (LST) and modified to act as tenders for patrol craft flotillas. They were 1,625 ton, 328-foot (100 m) vessels with a top speed of 12 knots (22 km/h; 14 mph).

Name	Acquired	Formerly	Fate
RVNS My Tho (HQ-800)	12 October 1970	USS Harnett County (LST-821)	Escaped to the Philippines, April 1975. To Philippine Navy as BRP Sierra Madre (LT-57).
RVNS Can Tho (HQ-801)	23 April 1971	USS Garrett County (LST-786)	Escaped to the Philippines, April 1975. To Philippine Navy as BRP Kalinga Apayao (LT-516)

== Landing Craft Repair Ship ==
The Achelous class (ARL) was a mobile repair ship based on the same hull as the LST. It was a 4,100-ton, 328-foot (100 m) vessel, with a top speed of 12 knots (22 km/h; 14 mph) and a crew of 255. Armament consisted of two quad and two twin 40 mm guns, and six twin 20 mm guns.

Name	Acquired	Formerly	Fate
RVNS Vinh Long (HQ-802)	30 September 1971	USS Satyr (ARL-23)	Escaped to the Philippines, April 1975. To Philippine Navy as BRP Yakal (AR-617).

== Armored Troop Carriers, Monitors and ASPBs ==
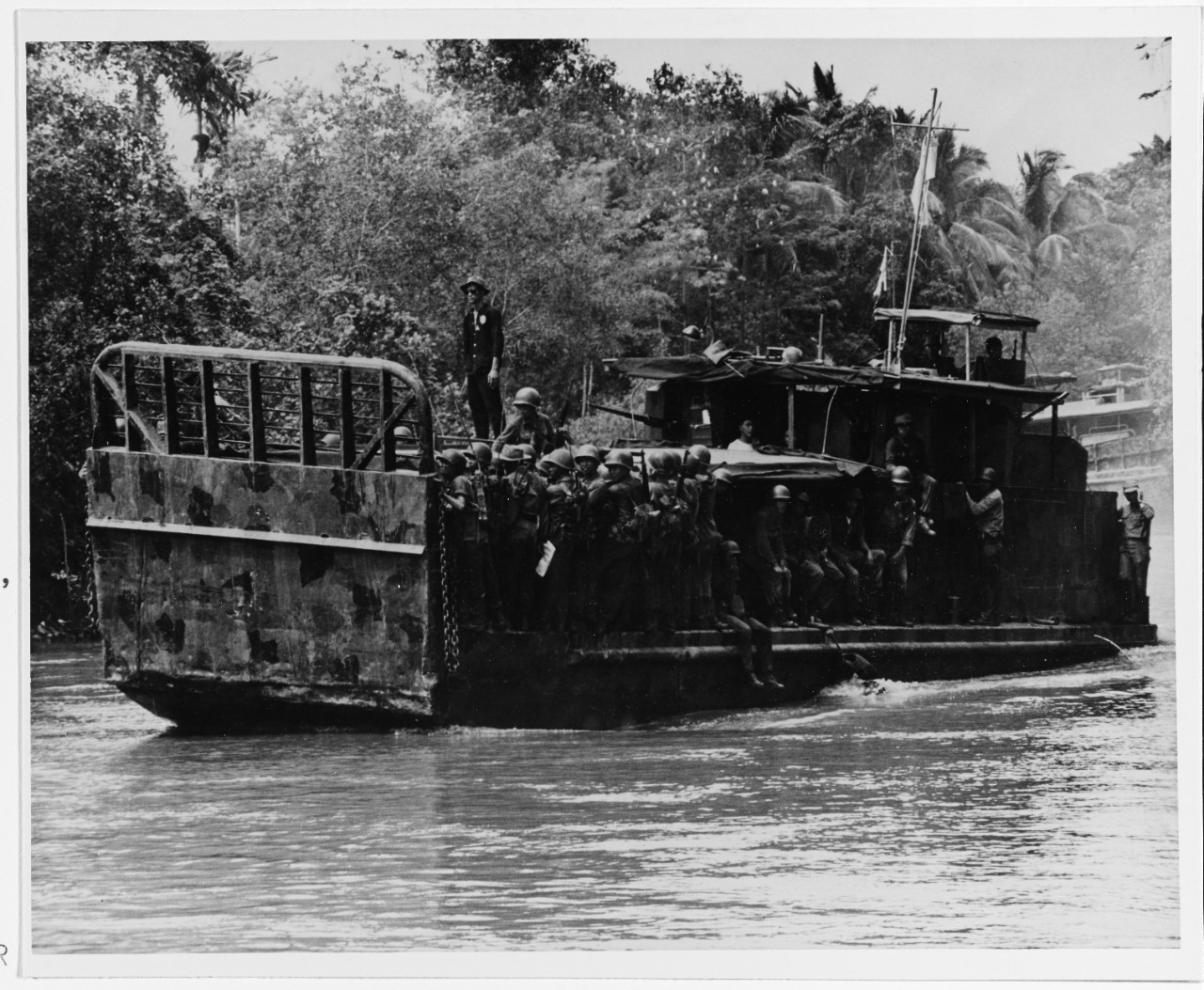
ATC in 1966

The Armored Troop Carrier (ATC), better known as the "Tango boat", were LCM-6 landing craft modified for riverine patrol missions. The front ramps were retained for loading and offloading troops, and an armoured superstructure was added. They were 66 ton, 56.5-foot (17.2 m) vessels, with a crew of 7. They had a top speed of 8.5 knots (15.7 km/h; 9.8 mph) and were armed with four M1919 Browning machine guns, two or three Mk 16 20 mm guns, and one Mk 19 grenade launcher.

The Monitor was a heavily armed gunboat, initially equipped with a 40 mm (1.6 in) cannon and an 81 mm (3.2 in) mortar. Later variants included the "Zippo" equipped with flamethrowers and another with a 105 mm (4.1 in) howitzer mounted in a bow turret. The "Charlie" command and control boat had a communications module midships in place of the mortar well.

The Assault Support Patrol Boat (ASPB), known as the "Alpha Boat" was a 50 feet (15 m) patrol boat armed with two Mk 16 20 mm guns or one Mk 16 and two .50 Browning machine guns, with eight 3.5-inch rocket launchers (on forward turret), and two Mk 21 7.62mm Brownings aft.

Name	Acquired	Formerly	Type	Fate
RVNS Vam Co Tay (HQ-1204)	?	?	ATC	Salvaged in small canal near Vam Co Tay.
RVNS HQ-1209	?	?	ATC	Salvaged near Ben Luc.
RVNS HQ-1224	?	?	ATC	Salvaged July 1969 Tra Cu.
RVNS HQ-1234	?	?	?	Salvaged November 1969 at Dong Hung.
RVNS HQ-1236	?	?	?	Sunk by enemy mine 22 March 1970.
RVNS HQ-1238	?	?	?	Demolished 1970 at Song Ong Doc.
RVNS HQ-1240	?	?	?	Sunk 1970.
RVNS HQ-1268	?	?	ATC	Mined by VC sapper December 1970.
RVNS HQ-1278	?	?	?	At Solid Anchor 31 October 1970.
RVNS HQ-1572	?	?	LCM-6	Salvaged at Ben Tre, then demolished at Rach Soi, March 1970.
RVNS HQ-5125	?	?	?	Sunk 1970.
RVNS HQ-5129	?	?	ASPB	Salvaged 1970 Dong Hong.
RVNS HQ-5135	?	?	?	Unknown
RVNS HQ-5144	?	?	?	Sunk by mine, 19 March 1970.
RVNS HQ-6527	?	?	Monitor	Sunk 1 April 1970.
RVNS HQ-6529	?	?	ATC	Sunk by mine south of Kien An.
RVNS HQ-9170	?	?	Zippo Refueler	Sunk by mine, September 1970.

== Repair, Berthing and Messing Barge ==
The YRBM-16-class Repair, Berthing and Messing Barge was a 2,700-ton, 261 foot vessel designed to provide support and accommodation for riverine forces.

Name	Acquired	Formerly	Fate
RVNS HQ-9612	October 1971	USS YRBM-16	Unknown

== Junks & Miscellaneous Craft ==
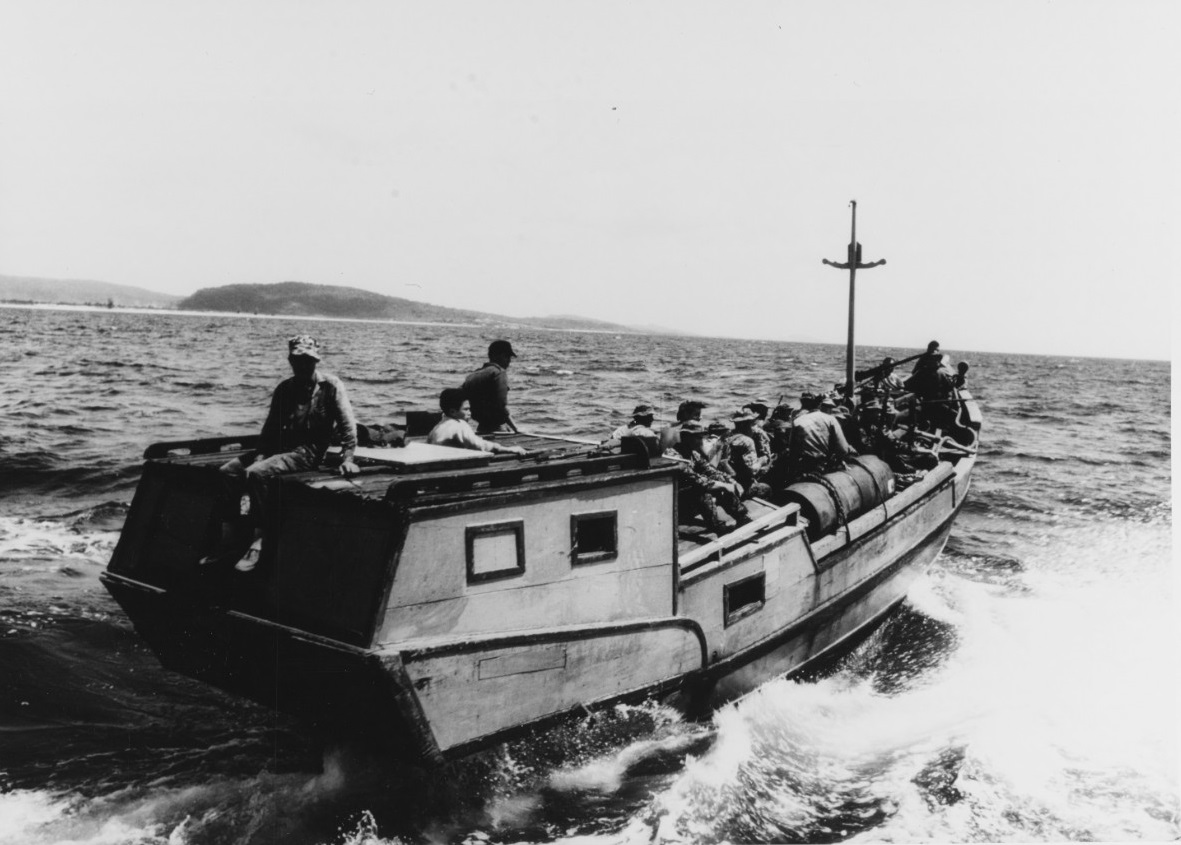
A Yabuta junk in 1966

In January 1972, there were approximately 250 motorised junks in service with the RVN, with very few, if any, armed sailing junks remaining. In addition, on 25 September 1971, USCGC WLV-523, a lightship, was transferred to South Vietnam in order to supplement the coastal naval radar stations already in use. It was renamed Da Bong (304).

Type	Number of Vessels
Command Junk	62
Kien Giang Junk	31
Yabuta Junk	153
