= USCGC Point Cypress =

United States Coast Guard cutter

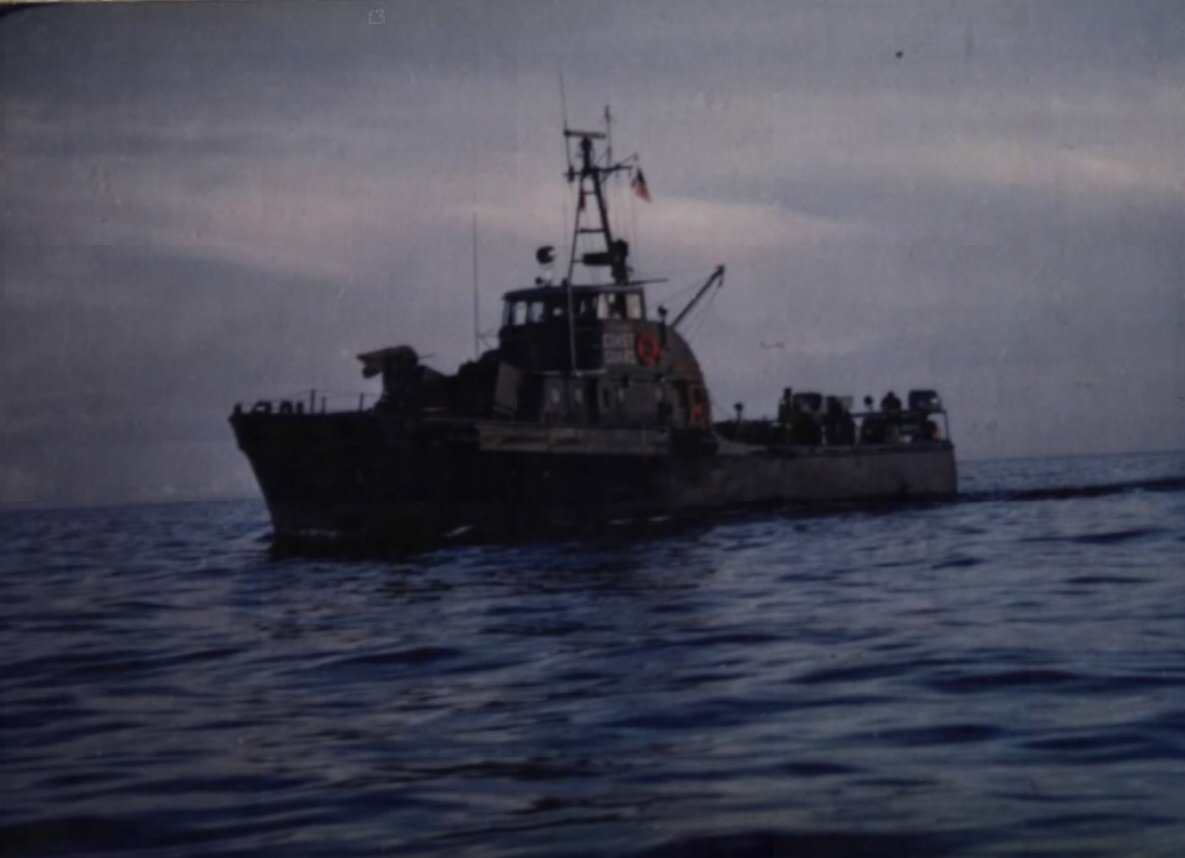
- USCGC Point Cypress (WPB-82326) off An Thoi, November 1968

History

United States
- Name: USCGC Point Cypress (WPB-82326)
- Owner: United States Coast Guard
- Builder: Coast Guard Yard, Curtis Bay, Maryland, U.S.
- Commissioned: 22 November 1961
- Decommissioned: 15 August 1970
- Honors and awards: Presidential Unit Citation (Navy); Navy Unit Commendation; Meritorious Unit Commendation (Navy); Vietnam Service Medal with 2 silver and 2 bronze service stars
- Fate: Transferred to Republic of Vietnam Navy as RVNS Hồ Duy (HQ-724), 15 August 1970

General characteristics
- Class & type: Point-class cutter
- Displacement: 60 tons
- Length: 82 ft 10 in (25.25 m)
- Beam: 17 ft 7 in (5.36 m) max
- Draft: 5 ft 11 in (1.80 m)
- Propulsion: 2 × 600 hp (447 kW) Cummins diesel engines
- Speed: 16.8 knots (31.1 km/h; 19.3 mph)
- Range: 577 nmi (1,069 km) at 14.5 kn (26.9 km/h; 16.7 mph); 1,271 nmi (2,354 km) at 10.7 kn (19.8 km/h; 12.3 mph)
- Complement: Domestic service : 8 men; Vietnam service : 2 officers, 8 men
- Armament: 1961; 1 × Oerlikon 20 mm cannon; Vietnam service; 5 × M2 Browning machine guns; 1 × 81 mm M29 mortar

USCGC Point Cypress (WPB-82326) was an 82-foot (25 m) Point-class cutter constructed at the Coast Guard Yard at Curtis Bay, Maryland in 1961 for use as a law enforcement and search and rescue patrol boat. Since the Coast Guard policy in 1961 was not to name cutters under 100-foot (30 m) in length, it was designated as WPB-82326 when commissioned and acquired the name Point Cypress in January 1964 when the Coast Guard started naming all cutters longer than 65-foot (20 m).

== Construction and design details ==
Point Cypress was built to accommodate an 8-man crew. She was powered by two 600 hp (447 kW) VT600 Cummins diesel main drive engines and had two five-bladed 42 in (1.1 m) propellers. The main drive engines were later replaced by 800 hp (597 kW) VT800 Cummins engines. Water tank capacity was 1,550 U.S. gallons (5,900 L) and fuel tank capacity was 1,840 U.S. gallons (7,000 L) at 95% full. Engine exhaust was ported through the transom rather than through a conventional stack and this permitted a 360-degree view from the bridge; a feature that was very useful in search and rescue work as well as a combat environment.

The design specifications for Point Cypress included a steel hull for durability and an aluminum superstructure and longitudinally framed construction was used to save weight. Ease of operation with a small crew size was possible because of the non-manned main drive engine spaces. Controls and alarms located on the bridge allowed one man operation of the cutter thus eliminating a live engineer watch in the engine room. Because of design, four men could operate the cutter; however, the need for resting watchstanders brought the crew size to eight men for normal domestic service. The screws were designed for ease of replacement and could be changed without removing the cutter from the water. A clutch-in idle speed of 3 knots (5.6 km/h; 3.5 mph) helped to conserve fuel on lengthy patrols and an 18-knot (33 km/h; 21 mph) maximum speed could get the cutter on scene quickly. Air-conditioned interior spaces were a part of the original design for the Point-class cutter. Interior access to the deckhouse was through a watertight door on the starboard side aft of the deckhouse. The deckhouse contained the cabin for the officer-in-charge and the executive petty officer. The deckhouse also included a small arms locker, scuttlebutt, a small desk and head. Access to the lower deck and engine room was down a ladder. At the bottom of the ladder was the galley, mess and recreation deck. A watertight door at the front of the mess bulkhead led to the main crew quarters which was ten feet long and included six bunks that could be stowed, three bunks on each side. Forward of the bunks was the crew's head complete with a compact sink, shower and commode. Accommodations for a 13-man crew were installed for Vietnam service.

== History ==
After delivery in 1961, Point Cypress was assigned a homeport of Boston, Massachusetts, where she served as a law enforcement and search and rescue patrol boat.

At the request of the United States Navy, in October 1965, she was alerted for service in South Vietnam and assigned to Coast Guard Squadron One in support of Operation Market Time along with eight other Point-class cutters. While the crew completed overseas training and weapons qualifications at Coast Guard Island and Camp Parks, California, Point Cypress was loaded on board merchant ship SS Pioneer Myth and transported to Subic Bay, Philippines arriving in January 1966 where she was refitted for combat service. Shipyard modifications included installation of new single-sideband radio equipment, additional floodlights, small arms lockers, bunks, additional sound-powered phone circuits, and the addition of four M2 machine guns. The original Oerlikon 20 mm cannon was replaced with a combination over-under .50 caliber machine gun/81 mm trigger fired mortar that had been developed by the Coast Guard for service in Vietnam. For service in Vietnam, two officers were added to the crew complement to add seniority to the crew in the mission of interdicting vessels at sea.

Point Cypress was assigned to Division 13 of Squadron One to be based at Cat Lo Naval Base near Vung Tau, along with USCGC Point Grace, USCGC Point Hudson, USCGC Point Jefferson, USCGC Point Kennedy, USCGC Point League, USCGC Point Partridge, USCGC Point Slocum and USCGC Point White. After sea trials, the Division left Subic Bay for Cat Lo on 19 February 1966 in the company of USS Forster, their temporary support ship. They arrived at their new duty station on 23 February and began patrolling the coastal waters near the Rung Sat Special Zone. Duty consisted of boarding Vietnamese junks to search for contraband weapons and ammunition and check the identification papers of persons on board.

On 10 May 1966 while on patrol, Division 11 cutter USCGC Point Grey interdicted a 120-foot (37 m) steel-hull trawler that beached near the Ca Mau Peninsula under covering fire from Viet Cong (VC) hiding in the tree line. With the assistance of USS Brister and USS Vireo, the VC were prevented from boarding the trawler to retrieve the arms and supplies it carried. Authorization was received to destroy the trawler and Point Cypress assisted Point Grey; both cutters using their mortars to set the trawler on fire. Later the whole area was shaken with a tremendous explosion as the trawler's ammunition supplies exploded. This incident marked the first time a Market Time unit had interdicted a suspicious trawler.

Point Cypress helped with the rescue Philippine tugboat Alyee which was threatened by high seas while pulling four barges from Saigon to Cam Ranh Bay on 16 December 1967.

On 5 December 1968, Fireman Heriberto S. "Ed" Hernandez, a crewman of Point Cypress, was killed in action during small boat operations near the Ca Mau Peninsula. He was one of seven Coast Guardsmen killed in action during the Vietnam War.

After 14 July 1970, Point Cypress and USCGC Point Marone were the last two cutters left in Squadron One, the other 24 having been previously transferred to the Republic of Vietnam Navy under the United States government's Vietnamization policy. On 19 July 1970 Point Cypress along with Point Marone were pulled off Market Time duties and sent to the Thanh Phu Secret Zone to land Kit Carson Scouts for a search and destroy mission. The two cutters used their mortars and machine guns to back up the assault which resulted in the capture of VC troops and boxes of enemy documents. A week later the same tactics were used with success by landing an Australian explosive ordnance detachment on the My Thanh River.

The last patrol of Point Cypress was conducted on 4 August with Point Marone in a narrow canal flowing into the Cổ Chiên River with 25 Kit Carson Scouts aboard each cutter and a mostly South Vietnamese Navy crew. After both cutters had turned around in the narrow canal, Point Marone was damaged by a command detonated mine causing three deaths among the Vietnamese crew and Scouts and several injuries. Point Cypress provided suppression fire with machine guns and her mortar and the Point Marone managed to clear the ambush scene. Eleven days later, on 15 August 1970 the patched and painted Point Marone and Point Cypress were turned over to the Republic of Vietnam Navy with Point Cypress recommissioned as RVNS Hồ Duy (HQ-724).
