= Rung Sat Special Zone =

Base area of the Viet Cong

Rung Sat Special Zone (Vietnamese: Đặc khu Rừng Sác) was the name given during the Vietnam War by the South Vietnam Government and American forces to a large area of the Sác Forest (Vietnamese Rừng Sác), which is today known as the Cần Giờ Mangrove Forest. It was also known as the "Forest of Assassins." The name was derived from a misinterpretation of the Vietnamese word Sát to mean "assassin". The actual name, Rừng Sác, is a Sino-Vietnamese word that roughly translated to "salty forest," a reference to its proximity to the saltwater marshes of the delta.

== History ==
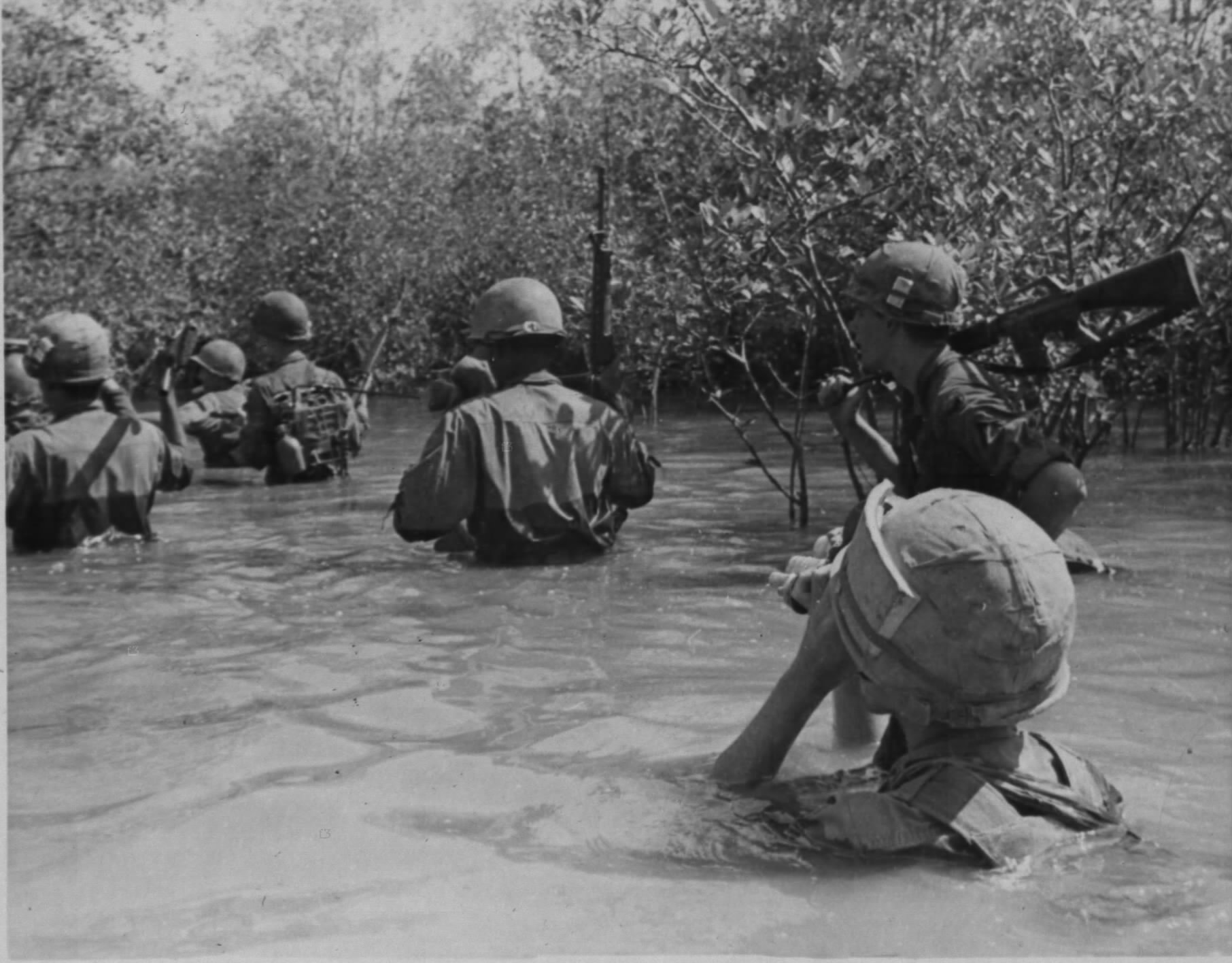
Members of Company "B", 3rd Battalion, 60th Infantry cross a stream on patrol near Rừng Sác, 27 October 1967

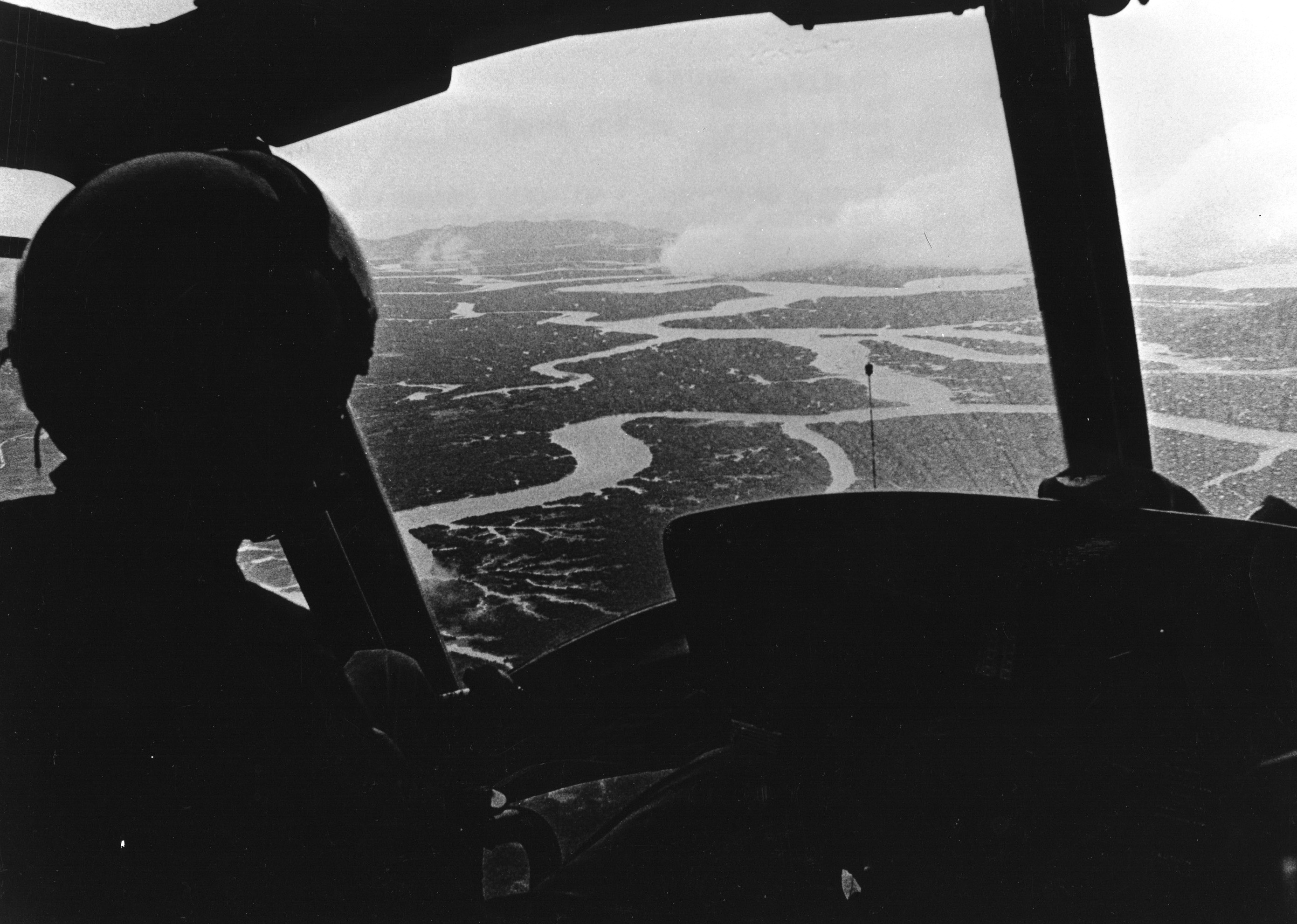
Helicopter view of the Rung Sat Special Zone, November 1967

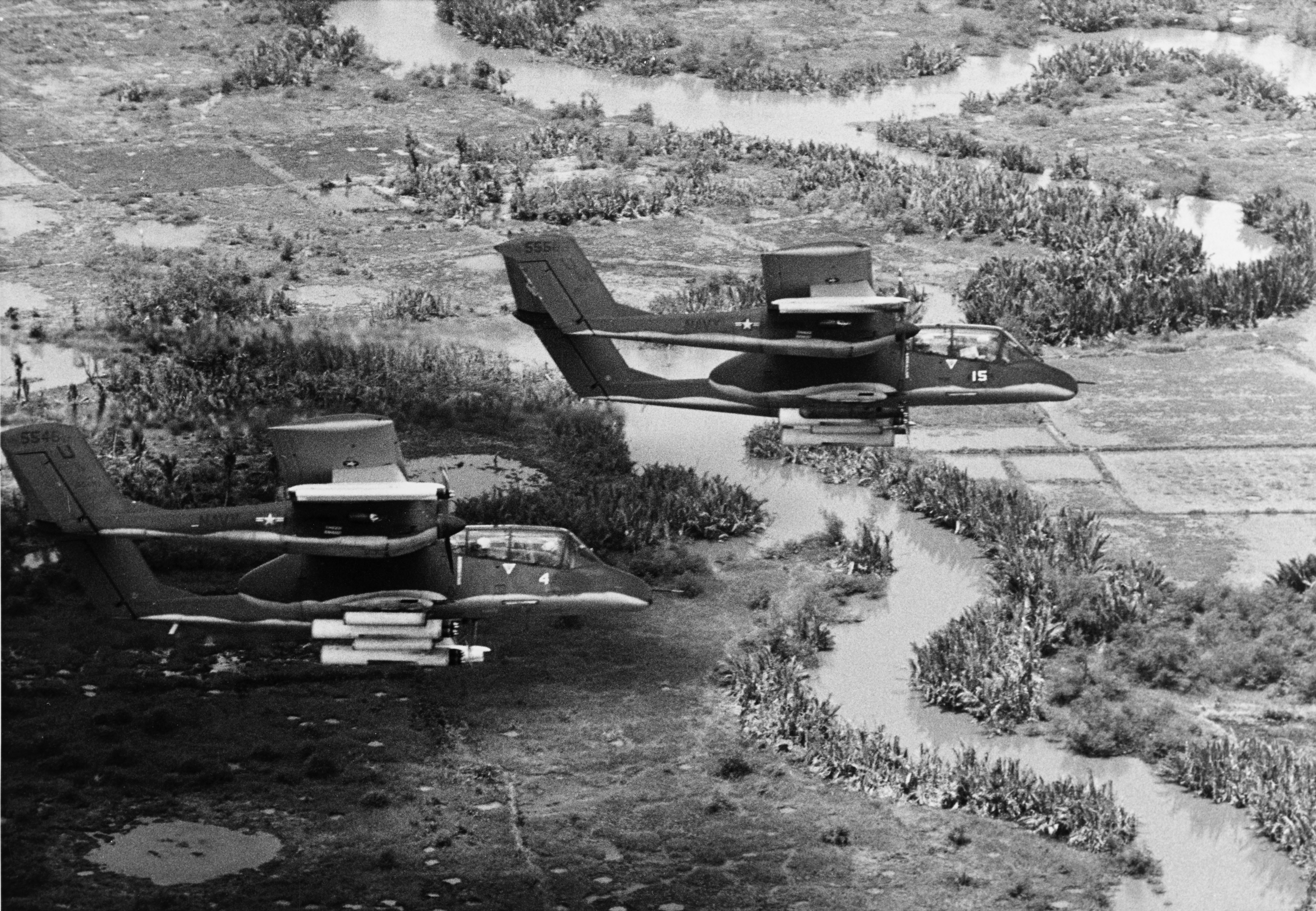
Two OV-10A Broncos of VAL-4 fly over the Zone, June 1969

The Sác Forest comprises approximately 1,256 square kilometres (485 sq mi) of tidal mangrove swamp including over 4,800 kilometres (3,000 mi) of interlocking streams located approximately 36 kilometres (22 mi) south-southeast of Saigon. Its boundaries in 1962 were Nhà Bè District and Nhơn Trạch District to the north, Long An Province and Tiền Giang Province to the west, Phước Tuy Province to the east and the South China Sea to the south.

On 8 June 1962, the South Vietnamese Government organized the Rung Sat Special Zone (Đặc khu Rừng Sác) as a military region in order to defend the Lòng Tàu River, the main shipping channel from Saigon to Vũng Tàu.

The Viet Cong (VC) established base areas in the zone from the late 1950s and in April 1966 COSVN designated the area as the D-10 Special Military Zone.

Due to the difficult conditions for ground operations within the zone, the VC regarded it as a safe area, however from 1965 onwards the USAF began defoliating the area as part of Operation Ranch Hand.

Following attacks on allied shipping on the Lòng Tàu River, from 27 March to 6 April 1966, 1st Battalion 5th Marines and two Battalions of Vietnamese Marines launched Operation Jackstay, a search and clear operation along the Lòng Tàu shipping channel killing 63 VC and seizing and destroying large supply caches.

Following the conclusion of Operation Jackstay, the Marines handed over responsibility for the zone to the 1st Battalion, 18th Infantry Regiment. Responsibility for security in the zone was then passed to the Mobile Riverine Force and the 9th Infantry Division.

On 20 May 1966 the U.S. Navy established Mine Squadron 11, Detachment Alpha (later renamed Mine Division 112). The unit’s twelve 57-foot fiberglass-hulled MSBs, along with Republic of Vietnam Navy (RVNN) minesweeping motor launches, continuously swept the river to ensure the safety of the merchant ships. Patrols were conducted early in the morning from Nhà Bè Base using paravanes and chain drag sweeps to sever electrical wires that connected mines in the river with VC guerrillas ashore ready to trigger them.

Heavy VC activity against U.S. merchant ships and river patrol forces on the Long Tau occurred during the period from December 1965 to February 1967. During that period the enemy made 18 attacks against allied vessels, including the 23 August 1966 attack on the SS Baton Rouge Victory.

In August 1966 attackers sank an RVNN minesweeper, killing or wounding five Vietnamese sailors and wounding two American naval advisers. The VC sank another minesweeper in January 1967. On 15 February 1967 VC ambushers struck MSB-49 with 75mm recoilless-rifle and automatic-weapons fire that wounded all six crew members and devastated the boat. That same day, the VC sank MSB-45, killing two American sailors and wounding another 16. On 20 April 1967, while en route to Saigon, T-LST-550 came under 75mm recoilless-rifle fire that killed one Japanese crew member and wounded another five. On 18 November the VC attacked American President Lines' SS President Buchanan. A further five merchant ships were attacked during 1967.

In 1968 the VC launched 44 attacks. In April two men on the tug Michael were killed. On 30 August the VC hit the roll-on/roll-off ship Transglobe with a 122mm rocket, mortally wounding one crewmember.

The VC launched 51 assaults in the first half of 1969. In June an operation was launched against the VC sapper battalion operating from the Nhơn Trạch District north of the Rừng Sác. A force of U.S. and South Vietnamese riverine combatants; attack helicopters; and U.S., Australian and Thái infantry units swept through Nhơn Trạch and part of the Rừng Sác. The operation resulted in the destruction of four VC base camps and the death or capture of 53 VC. Afterward, U.S. and South Vietnamese forces kept applying pressure on the VC, frustrating their efforts to regroup. Army bulldozers and aerial-sprayed herbicides denuded much of the Rừng Sác’s foliage. The VC did not launch a single attack on the merchant ships transiting the Lòng Tàu well into 1970. On 1 November 1970 the VC carried out an attack on the American President Lines' SS President Coolidge, but the next attack did not occur until a year later when they struck SeaLand's Raphael Semmes.

The Rung Sat formed the western boundary of the 1st Australian Task Force (1 ATF) tactical area of responsibility. From July to November 1970 1 ATF forces mounted 17 boat patrols in the Rung Sat with limited results, before switching to helicopter patrols that would land troops to investigate any VC sightings.
