= USS Forster =

1943 Edsall-class destroyer escort

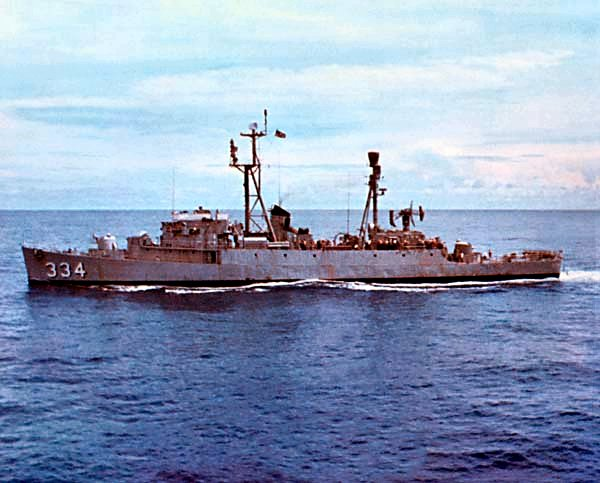

History

United States
- Name: USS Forster (DE-334)
- Namesake: Edward William Forster
- Builder: Consolidated Steel Corporation, Orange, Texas
- Laid down: 31 August 1943
- Launched: 13 November 1943
- Commissioned: 25 January 1944
- Decommissioned: 25 September 1971
- Reclassified: DER-334, 21 October 1955
- Stricken: 25 September 1971
- Fate: Loaned to South Vietnam, 25 September 1971

United States
- Name: USCGC Forster WDE-434
- Commissioned: 29 June 1951
- Decommissioned: 25 May 1954
- Fate: Returned to USN, 25 May 1954

South Vietnam
- Name: RVNS Trần Khánh Dư (HQ-04)
- Acquired: 25 September 1971
- Fate: Captured by North Vietnam, 29 April 1975

Vietnam
- Name: VPNS Dai Ky (HQ-03)
- Acquired: 29 April 1975
- Status: In service c. 1997, status unknown

General characteristics
- Class & type: Edsall-class destroyer escort
- Displacement: 1,253 tons standard; 1,590 tons full load
- Length: 306 ft (93 m)
- Beam: 36.58 ft (11.15 m)
- Draft: 10.42 ft (3.18 m) full load
- Propulsion: 4 × FM diesel engines; 4 × diesel generators, 6,000 shp (4,500 kW); 2 × screws
- Speed: 21 knots (39 km/h; 24 mph)
- Range: 9,100 nmi (16,900 km; 10,500 mi) at 12 knots (22 km/h; 14 mph)
- Complement: 8 officers, 201 enlisted
- Armament: 3 × single 3 in (76 mm)/50 guns; 1 × twin 40 mm AA guns; 8 × single 20 mm AA guns; 1 × triple 21 in (533 mm) torpedo tubes; 8 × depth charge projectors; 1 × depth charge projector (hedgehog); 2 × depth charge tracks

USS Forster (DE-334) was an Edsall-class destroyer escort built for the U.S. Navy during World War II.

== Namesake ==
Edward William Forster was born 8 October 1884 in Jersey City, New Jersey. He enlisted in the Navy on 25 August 1919, and was warranted Machinist on 25 June 1942. On 17 August 1940, he joined USS Vincennes and was killed when it was sunk in the Battle of Savo Island, 9 August 1942.

== Construction and commissioning ==
She was launched on 13 November 1943 by Consolidated Steel Corporation, Orange, Texas, sponsored by Mrs. E. W. Forster, widow of Machinist Edward W. Forster. Forster was commissioned 25 January 1944 and served as an escort in the Atlantic and Mediterranean during World War II. She was decommissioned and placed in reserve at Green Cove Springs, Florida on 15 June 1946.

== Coast Guard service ==
She was turned over to the United States Coast Guard on 20 June 1951. Forster (given the Coast Guard hull number WDE-434) served on ocean station duty out of Honolulu. This included duty on Ocean Stations VICTOR, QUEEN, and SUGAR and voyages to Japan. She also conducted search and rescue duties, including finding and assisting the following vessels in distress: the M/V Katori Maru on 17 August 1952, assisting the M/V Chuk Maru on 29 August 1953, the M/V Tongshui on 1 – 3 October 1953, and the M/V Steel Fabricator on 26 October 1953. She was returned to the Navy on 25 May 1954.

== Return to U.S. Navy service ==
Forster was converted from DE to DER 334 in the early 1950s in Long Beach California and she was recommissioned at Long Beach, California, 23 October 1956. She served as a part of the DEW (Defense Early Warning) Line in the North Pacific. And was stationed about 200 miles off the coast of Seattle, where she was based. Typical duty would be two weeks on station, cruising North and South off the coast, then 2 weeks in port. She was stationed out of Pearl Harbor in the 1960s and served in the Western Pacific on Operation Market Time in 1968-69 patrolling the South Vietnamese coast for contraband shipping and providing sea to shore fire when called upon. She served on patrol in the Formosa Straits in 1969. She was transferred to the Atlantic fleet in late 1969.

== Republic of Vietnam service ==
In February 1966, Forster escorted the nine cutters comprising Division 13 of Coast Guard Squadron One from Naval Base Subic Bay to Vung Tau in South Vietnam. She served in the Navy until she was transferred on 25 September 1971 to the Republic of Vietnam Navy. The Vietnamese reclassified her as a frigate and renamed her RVNS Trần Khánh Dư (HQ-04). In 1974, she participated in the Battle of the Paracel Islands.

== Socialist Republic of Vietnam service ==
She was in a shipyard, in overhaul, when Saigon fell on 30 April 1975, and was captured by North Vietnamese forces. The Vietnam People's Navy renamed her VPNS Dai Ky (HQ-03), she was apparently still seaworthy in 1997 and was used as a training ship. By 1999, she was reduced to a training hulk.

== Military awards and honors ==
Combat Action Ribbon
American Campaign Medal
Asiatic–Pacific Campaign Medal
European-African-Middle Eastern Campaign Medal (with one bronze service star)
World War II Victory Medal
Navy Occupation Service Medal
National Defense Service Medal (with one bronze service star)
Antarctica Service Medal
Armed Forces Expeditionary Medal (with one bronze service star)
Vietnam Service Medal (with one silver and two bronze service stars)
Vietnam Gallantry Cross Unit Citation with Palm (with four bronze service stars)
Vietnam Campaign Medal
