= List of naval ships named for Minnesota =

There were 59 United States Navy or Coast Guard ships named for Minnesota, Minnesota communities, lakes, rivers and railroads.

- USS Minnesota, a steam frigate named for the Minnesota River, commissioned in 1855 and sold in 1901.
- USS Minnesota (BB-22), one of the last pre-dreadnought battleships, commissioned in 1907 and decommissioned in 1921.
- USS Minnesota (SSN-783), a Virginia-class attack submarine commissioned in 2013.
- USS Beltrami (AK-162), an Alamosa-class cargo ship commissioned for service in World War II.
- USS Duluth (CL-87) was a Cleveland-class light cruiser commissioned late in World War II.
- USS Duluth (LPD-6) is an amphibious transport dock commissioned in 1966 and decommissioned in 2005.
- USS Faribault (AK-179), an Alamosa-class cargo ship commissioned for service in World War II.
- USS Fort Snelling (LSD-30), a dock landing ship which served during World War II
- USS Goodhue (APA-107) was a Bayfield-class attack transport that served during World War II.
- USS Gopher (gunboat), a converted lighthouse tender used as a training ship by the Minnesota Naval Militia in Duluth between 1905 and 1917.
- SS Gopher State (ACS-4), a Gopher State-class crane ship serving with the Military Sealift Command, Prepositioning Force.
- USS Great Northern (AG-9)
- USS Hennepin (AK-187), an Alamosa-class cargo ship commissioned for service in World War II.
- USS Itasca, a Unadilla-class gunboat in service during the Civil War from 1861 to 1865.
- USS Itasca II (SP-803), a patrol vessel in commission from 1917 to 1918.
- USS Itasca (SP-810), a patrol vessel in commission from 1917 to 1919.
- USS Kaposia (AO-65) oiler type T3-S2-A1
- USS Kawishiwi (AO-146), a Neosho-class oiler commissioned in 1955.
- USS Kittson (APA-123), a Haskell-class attack transport commissioned for service in World War II.
- USS Lake Pepin (ID 4215) built in Duluth in 1918
- USS Mahonmen County (LST-912), an LST-542-class tank landing ship built during World War II.
- USS Mankato (YTM-65) Medium Harbor tug
- USS Mankato (YN-40) Built 1940 redesignated YNT-8, later reclassified YTB-734 and finally YTM-734.
- USS Meeker County (LST-980), an LST-542-class tank landing ship built during World War II.
- USS Mendota, a Sassacus-class sidewheel gunboat in service during the Civil War from 1864 to 1865.
- USS Mendota (YT-33)
- USS Minneapolis (C-13, later CA-17), a Columbia-class protected cruiser which served during World War I.
- USS Minneapolis (CA-36), a New Orleans-class heavy cruiser which served during World War II.
- USS Minneapolis-St. Paul (SSN-708), a Los Angeles-class nuclear attack submarine in commission between 1984 and 2008.
- USS Minnetonka, a wooden steam frigate launched in 1867, but renamed USS California before commissioning in 1870.
- USS Minnetonka, a Casco-class monitor commissioned as the USS Naubuc in 1865 and renamed in 1869.
- USS Mississippi A wooden paddle frigate named for the Ojibwe word for the river. Scuttled 1863.
- USS Nicollet (AVS-6), an Alamosa-class cargo ship commissioned for service in World War II.
- USS Northern Pacific
- USS Olmsted (APA-188) was a Haskell-class attack transport, built and used during World War II.
- USS Owatonna (YTM-756) medium harbor tug
- USS Pipestone
- USS Redwing (AM-48) transferred to Coast Guard and as the USS Redwing (ARS-4) USCGC Redwing.
- USS Redwing (AMS-200) 1955 minesweeper
- USS Redwing (YTB-783) 1985 large harbor tug
- USS Renville (APA-227) was a Haskell-class attack transport, built and used during World War II.
- USS Rainy River (LSM(R)-521), a WWII rocket-equipped Landing Ship.
- USS Saint Croix River (LSM(R)-524) a WWII rocket-equipped Landing Ship.
- USS Saint Paul, a converted merchant cruiser which served during the Spanish–American War and World War I
- USS Saint Paul (CA-73), a Baltimore-class heavy cruiser which served from late in World War II until the Vietnam War.
- USS Sherburne (APA-205) was a Haskell-class attack transport of the US Navy, built and used during World War II.
- USS Sibley (APA-206) was a Haskell-class attack transport of the US Navy, built and used during World War II.
- USS Traverse County (LST-1160), a landing ship tank (LST) in commission from 1953 to 1970.
- USS Winona, a Unadilla-class gunboat built for service during the Civil War.
- USS Wapasha (YN-45) built 1938
- USS Watonwan (ID-4296) single screw freighter built 1918.
- USS Worthington PC-1137 PC-461-class-submarine chaser
- USS Zumbrota (SO-93/YP-93)
- USCGC Itasca Lake-class cutter
- USCGC Mendota Lake-class cutter transferred to the Royal Navy in 1941 under Lend-Lease and renamed HMS Culver. Torpedoed and sunk in 1942 by U-105.
- USCGC Winona (WHEC-65) WWII Owasco-class cutter.
- USCGC Minnetonka (WHEC-67) WWII Owasco-class cutter.
- USCGC Mendota (WHEC-69) WWII Owasco-class cutter.
