= USS Willoughby (AGP-9) =

Tender of the United States Navy

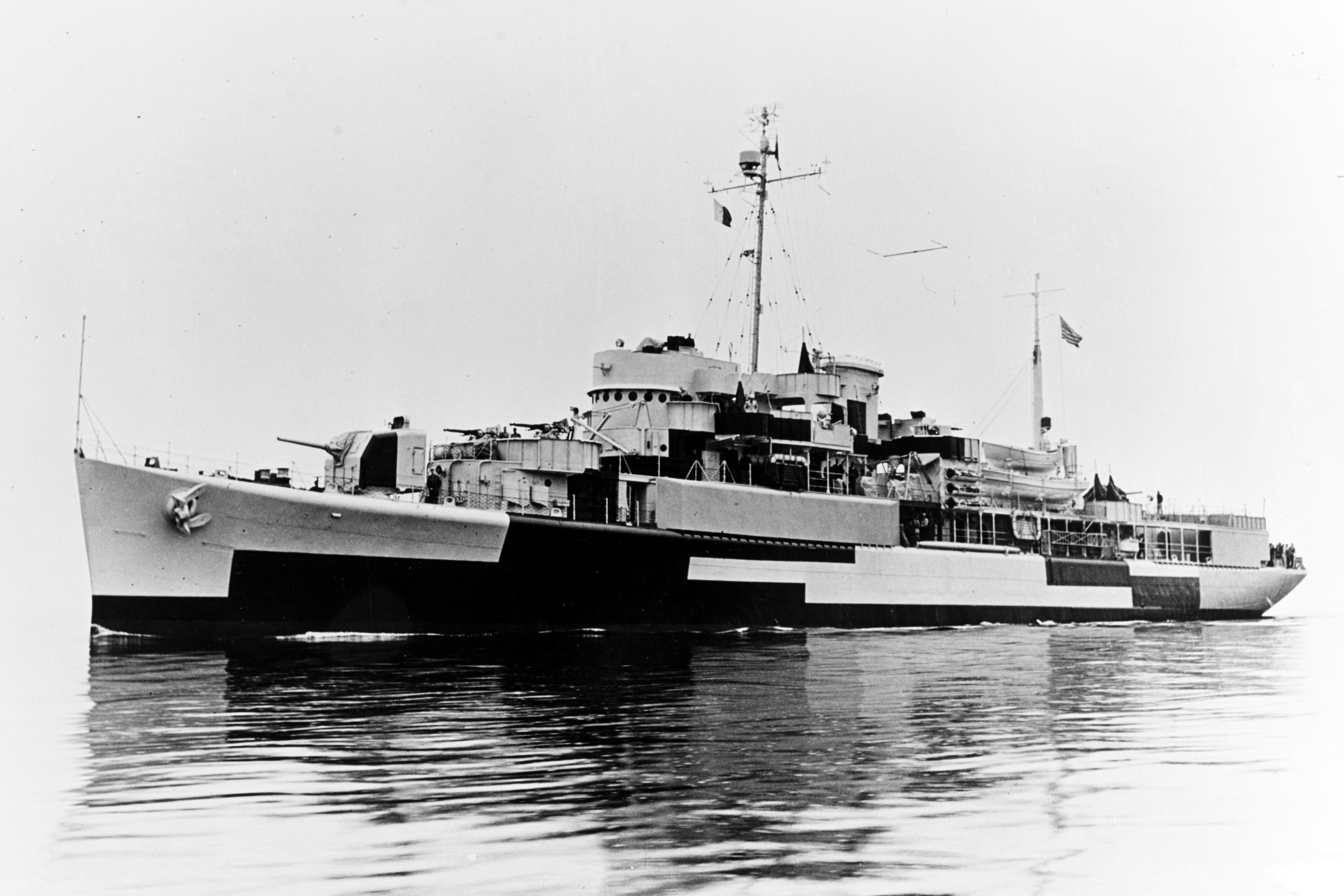
- USS Willoughby (AGP-9) on 24 June 1944, six days after commissioning

History

United States
- Name: USS Willoughby (AVP-57)
- Namesake: Willoughby Bay, an estuary of Hampton Roads in Virginia
- Builder: Lake Washington Shipyards, Houghton, Washington
- Laid down: 15 March 1943
- Launched: 21 August 1943
- Sponsored by: Mrs. D. R. Lee
- Reclassified: Motor torpedo boat tender, AGP-9, on 11 May 1943
- Commissioned: 18 June 1944
- Decommissioned: 26 June 1946
- Honors and awards: Three battle stars for her World War II service
- Fate: Transferred to United States Coast Guard 27 May 1946
- Stricken: 19 July 1946

United States
- Name: USCGC Gresham (WAVP-387)
- Namesake: Walter Q. Gresham (1832–1895), United States Secretary of State (1893-1895)
- Acquired: 26 June 1946
- Commissioned: 1 December 1947
- Reclassified: High endurance cutter (WHEC-387) 1 May 1966
- Decommissioned: 1969
- Recommissioned: January 1970
- Reclassified: Meteorological cutter (WAGW-387) 27 February 1970
- Decommissioned: 25 April 1973
- Fate: Transferred to Maritime Administration 21 May 1973; Sold for scrapping 25 October 1973

General characteristics (seaplane tender)
- Class & type: Barnegat-class seaplane tender, converted during construction into a motor torpedo boat tender
- Displacement: 1,766 tons (light); 2,592 tons (full load)
- Length: 310 ft 9 in (94.72 m)
- Beam: 41 ft 1 in (12.52 m)
- Draft: 13 ft 6 in (4.11 m)
- Installed power: 6,000 horsepower (4.48 megawatts)
- Propulsion: Diesel engine, two shafts
- Speed: 18.2 knots
- Complement: 246
- Sensors & processing systems: Radar; sonar
- Armament: 2 × 5 in (130 mm) gun; 8 × 40 mm antiaircraft guns; 8 × 20 mm antiaircraft guns; 2 × depth charge tracks

General characteristics (Coast Guard cutter)
- Class & type: Casco-class cutter
- Displacement: 2,530.7 tons (full load)
- Length: 309 ft 9.5 in (94.425 m) overall; 298 ft 9.375 in (91.06853 m) between perpendiculars
- Beam: 41 ft 2.125 in (12.55078 m) maximum
- Draft: 13 ft 0.5 in (3.975 m) aft (full load)
- Installed power: 6,080 bhp (4,530 kW)
- Propulsion: Fairbanks-Morse direct-reversing diesel engines, two shafts; 166,429 US gallons (630,000 L) of fuel
- Speed: 18.3 knots (33.9 km/h) (maximum at full load); 11.0 knots (20.4 km/h) (economic)
- Range: 20,500 nautical miles (38,000 km) at 11.0 knots (20.4 km/h)s
- Complement: 151 (10 officers, 3 warrant officers, 138 enlisted personnel)
- Sensors & processing systems: Radars in 1965 (one each): AN-SPS-29D, Mark 26 Mod 3, AN-UPX-1, AN-SPA-34, AN-SPS-23, ID-445-SPS, IP-307-SPS, AN-SPA-52, IP-306-SPS; Sonars in 1965 (one each): AN-SQS-1, 55134-B, Mk-461-UQC-1A, AN-SQA-2
- Armament: In 1965: one single 5-inch (127 mm) 38-caliber Mark 30 Mod 65, 1 x Mark 52-2 Mod 3 director, 1 x Mark 26-4 fire-control radar, 1 x Mark 10-1 antisubmarine projector, 2 x Mark 32 Mod 2 torpedo tubes

The second USS Willoughby (AGP-9) was a motor torpedo boat tender that served in the United States Navy from 1944 to 1946, seeing service in the later stages of World War II. Transferred to the United States Coast Guard in 1946, she was in commission as the cutter USCGC Gresham (WAVP-387), later WHEC-387 and WAGW-387, from 1947 to 1969 and from 1970 to 1973, seeing service in the Vietnam War during her Coast Guard career.

== Construction and commissioning ==
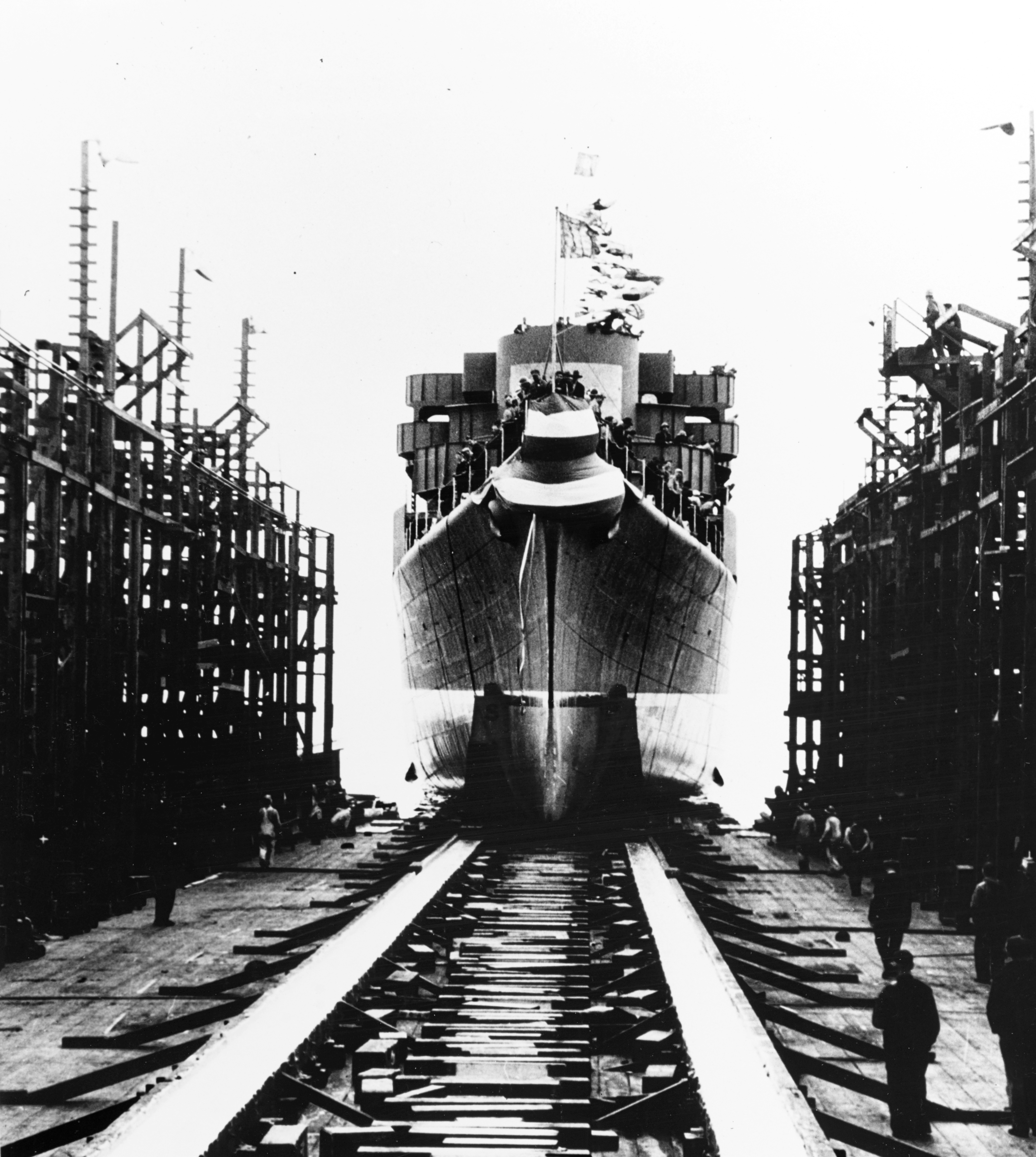
Willoughby is launched at Lake Washington Shipyard, Houghton, Washington, on 23 August 1943.

Willoughby was laid down as a Barnegat-class small seaplane tender designated AVP-57 on 15 March 1943 at Houghton, Washington, by Lake Washington Shipyards. She was reclassified as a motor torpedo boat tender and redesignated AGP-9 on 11 May 1943. Launched on 21 August 1943, sponsored by Mrs. D. R. Lee, she was commissioned on 18 June 1944.

== United States Navy service ==
=== World War II ===
After fitting out and undergoing sea trials, Willoughby conducted her shakedown out of San Diego, California, from 9 July 1944 to 4 August 1944, exercising in antisubmarine warfare operations and antiaircraft and gunnery drills and running further speed trials. Following a post-shakedown periods in the shipyard at Terminal Island, California, from 5 August 1944 to 11 August 1944, Willoughby shifted to San Francisco, California, where she loaded stores before getting underway on 15 August 1944, bound for Funafuti in the Ellice Islands.

While she was en route, her destination was changed to Manus Island in the Admiralty Islands. Willoughby fueled and took on stores at Tulagi in the Solomon Islands on 1 September 1944 before she reached her destination, Seeadler Harbor, Manus, on 6 September 1944. Her stay there proved brief, however, for she got underway that day, bound for the Padaido Islands.

The voyage to Mios Woendi proved eventful, as Willoughby picked up a sound contact on sonar at 1335 hours on 7 September 1944, distance 1,000 yards (910 m). Going to general quarters, the ship commenced a run on what, after the executive officer had reported seeing a torpedo wake pass the ship, she believed to be a submarine. At 1342 hours, Willoughby dropped four depth charges and, although she lost contact with the submarine, continued her search of the area. Regaining a slight sound contact at 1512 hours, Willoughby made another run but did not drop depth charges. The ship secured from general quarters at 1632 hours, resumed her voyage, and arrived at Mios Woendi on 8 September 1944.

==== New Guinea campaign ====
Willoughby tended patrol torpedo boats (PT boats) at Mios Woendi from 9 September 1944 to 12 October 1944. During that time, the New Guinea campaign was gradually coming to an end; PT boats operating from Mios Woendi were finding slimmer pickings to choose from in regard to Japanese barge traffic. All combat patrols from Mios Woendi finally ceased on 16 November 1944 when the Japanese evacuation from New Guinea had been completed.

==== Philippines campaign ====
===== The Leyte campaign begins =====
Willoughby was part of the burgeoning force of PT boats and their tenders that had grown as the World War II in the Southwest Pacific had progressed. So significant had been the role of PT boats in the island-hopping campaigns that they were slated to take part in supporting the initial landings in the Philippine Islands. Moving the motor torpedo boats from New Guinea to the Philippines, however, presented a problem.

Commander Selman S. Bowling, commanding Motor Torpedo Boat Squadron (MTBRon) 21, considered the voyage too long to be made "in one hop, even if escorted by tenders." The margin of safety for the ships to operate with, once they arrived in the objective area after the long voyage, was deemed unacceptable. Fuel was critical.

Ultimately, the decision was made to route the boats via the recently secured Palau Islands, sending them along with their tenders. Willoughby made up part of this significant movement—described as "the largest and longest mass movement of PT's under their own power during the war"—that began on 13 October 1944, at Mios Woendi.

On that day, Willoughby, in company with motor torpedo boat tenders USS Oyster Bay (AGP-6) (Commander Bowling's flagship) and USS Wachapreague (AGP-8), seaplane tender USS Half Moon (AVP-26), two United States Army craft, and 45 PT boats, sailed for the Palaus on the first leg of their monumental voyage of 1,200 nautical miles (2,222 kilometers). At Naval Base Kossol Roads, the PT boats fueled from the tenders, while the tenders in turn fueled from accompanying oilers. On the second leg of the trip, the PT boats fueled at sea from the tenders, a difficult task but a necessary one if the PT boats were to arrive off Leyte with their fuel tanks full and ready to go.

The PT boats arrived at Leyte Gulf on the morning of 20 October 1944, the first day of the landings on the western beaches of Leyte proper, and commenced patrols that evening. Willoughby steamed to San Pedro Bay, off Leyte, arriving there at 1443 hours on 21 October 1944, and tended the PT boats of Motor Torpedo Boat Squadrons (MTBRons) 7 and 21 over the ensuing weeks.

On 23 October 1944, Willoughby took on board a man from USS PT-325 who had been wounded by shrapnel during Japanese air attacks that day. On 24 October 1944, heavy Japanese air attacks upon the American invasion forces commenced at 0750 hours; American combat air patrol (CAP) fighters shot down four Japanese twin-engined Mitsubishi G4M "Betty" bombers, one of them attempting a suicide dive into a transport. A few moments later, a formation of "Sally" light bombers came into the area, and a heavy antiaircraft barrage claimed three of them. CAP fighters and antiaircraft fire combined to down most of another mixed group of Japanese planes —- Kawasaki Ki-45 "Nicks," Aichi D3A "Vals," and a Mitsubishi Ki-46 "Dinah" that attacked subsequently.

Willoughby gunners claimed two planes downed—this was reduced to one the next day—and one of the planes she damaged crashed into and sank a nearby landing craft infantry (LCI). Willoughby brought on board five of the LCI's survivors and saw a kamikaze crash into the ocean-going tug USS Sonoma (ATO-12). During the day, Willoughby stood at general quarters at one point for a stretch of six and one-half hours.

Japanese air attacks enlivened the next day, 25 October 1944, as well. During that 24-hour span, Willoughby was at general quarters for 11 and one-half hours. She also shot down one Japanese plane.

===== The Battle of Leyte Gulf =====
Meanwhile, major Japanese naval forces were approaching the Philippines from three directions. The Japanese southern force was heading through the Sulu Sea in the direction of Surigao Strait, their central force was crossing the Sibuyan Sea toward the San Bernardino Strait, and a northern force of Japanese aircraft carriers was north of Luzon, hoping to lure the American Fast Carrier Task Force away from Leyte Gulf.

For the first time since the 1942 fighting off Guadalcanal, the opposing sides arrayed battleships against one another. Rear Admiral Jesse B. Oldendorf deployed his forces across the northern end of Surigao Strait. Thirty-nine of the 45 PT boats that had come from Mios Woendi and made the long voyage via the Palaus deployed in sections of three boats each, strung out through the straits and along the coasts of Mindanao, Leyte, and Bohol, into the Mindanao Sea, to detect and report on the enemy's approach.

In the Battle of Surigao Strait that followed, the PT boats played a significant role. "The skill, determination, and courage displayed by the personnel of these small boats is worthy of the highest praise," reported Admiral Chester W. Nimitz subsequently. "Their contact reports," he continued, "as well as the firing and illumination they drew from the enemy, gave ample warning to our own main body; and, while the issue of the later main engagement was never in doubt, the PT's action very probably threw the Japanese command off balance and contributed to the completeness of their subsequent defeat."

All boats attached to Willoughby participated in that important encounter, while the tender herself remained at San Pedro Bay. The battle was just one part of the larger Battle of Leyte Gulf of 23 October 1944 – 26 October 1944, in which the Imperial Japanese Navy suffered a crushing defeat.

===== The Leyte campaign concludes =====
In ensuing days, Willoughby experienced Japanese air attacks at odd intervals during daylight hours. On the morning of 27 October 1944, one of her boats came under attack by Japanese planes, when a Mitsubishi A6M Zero (or "Zeke") dropped a fragmentation bomb off the bow of USS PT-152. Two men died and eight were wounded; the boat subsequently pulled next to Willoughby and transferred the dead and wounded to the tender.

Also while at San Pedro Bay, Willoughby experienced a storm of typhoon intensity on 30 October 1944. During that spell of heavy weather, the storm carried away one of the ship's motor launches, but it was later recovered. The ship herself suffered no damage.

From 31 October 1944 to 12 November 1944, Willoughby experienced daily air raids. On 5 November 1944, Japanese planes scored a direct hit on USS PT-320, moored off the tender's starboard bow, demolishing the boat and killing nearly the entire crew; only one man survived. A week later, on 12 November 1944, a flight of suicide aircraft attacked; while Willoughby herself was not touched, she witnessed kamikazes crash into landing craft repair ships USS Egeria (ARL-8) and USS Achilles (ARL-41).

Willoughby and her sister ship Wachapreague retired from Leyte on 13 November 1944 and arrived at Mios Woendi on 16 November. On 17 and 18 November 1944, the motor torpedo boat tenders loaded stores and supplies. Later, in company with motor torpedo boat tender USS Pontus (AGP-20), Wachapreague, seven Army crash boats and 41 PT boats, Willoughby departed New Guinea and proceeded vai Kossol Roads back to the Philippines, in a repeat performance of the previous mass movement of PT boats from New Guinea to that strategic archipelago. After servicing the PT boats en route, at Kossol Roads, on 23 November 1944, Willoughby steamed into Leyte Gulf, arriving late on 27 November 1944.

The tender manned her general quarters stations when a large American task force nearby – composed of battleships, cruisers, and destroyers – underwent a Japanese air attack. Shells from friendly ships fell "perilously near" Willoughby, but she emerged unscathed as the force repulsed the Japanese raid.

===== The Luzon campaign =====
Shifting to Espiritu Santo soon thereafter, Willoughby picked up necessary spare parts vital to the continued operation of PT boats in the Philippine Islands on 4 January 1945 and departed for the Treasury Islands on 5 January 1945, where she picked up more spare parts after her arrival on 8 January 1945. She continued loading operations at Green Island, Emirau Island, and Manus before returning to the Philippines, anchoring in San Juanico Strait on 18 January 1945.

Over the next three days, Willoughby unloaded the vital spares that had been gathered on the recently completed voyage. She then steamed to Mangarin Bay, off Mindoro Island, towing a fuel barge and a small pontoon drydock, and in company with 25 Army tugs escorted by two destroyer escorts, and arrived there on 31 January 1945. En route, on 27 January 1945, she spotted a Japanese plane, but it did not attack the convoy.

Willoughby was at Mindoro only briefly. Underway soon thereafter, she took the kamikaze-damaged destroyer USS Gansevoort (DD-608) in tow. Since no other vessels were available to tow the crippled destroyer, Willoughby drew that special duty and pulled the ship to San Pedro Bay, arriving on 5 February 1945. Willoughby then resumed tending PT boats at San Pedro Bay on 6 February 1945.

Willoughby, carrying the personnel of MTBRons 20 and 30, departed Leyte on 19 February 1945 in a Mindoro-bound convoy with 25 landing ships tank (LSTs), 15 landing ships medium (LSMs), nine LCIs, seven motor minesweepers (YMS), a patrol craft (PC), a small coastal transport (APC), and three submarine chasers (SC). On the morning of 21 February 1945, the Japanese submarine Ro-43 torpedoed destroyer USS Renshaw (DD-499), one of the convoy's escorts. The torpedo struck the destroyer's forward fire room, leaving her dead in the water. Destroyer USS Shaw (DD-373) stayed behind to protect the crippled Renshaw while the convoy proceeded. Ultimately, a tug, dispatched from Leyte, brought the crippled Renshaw into port.

===== The Palawan campaign =====
Willoughby meanwhile arrived at Mangarin Bay, Mindoro, on 23 February 1945 to prepare for the imminent invasion of Palawan, in the southern Philippine Islands. On 27 February 1945, Willoughby weighed anchor and set out for Palawan with a convoy of 19 LST's and 21 PT boats, escorted by four destroyers. On 28 February 1945, units of the 8th Army went ashore on Palawan, the westernmost major island in the Philippine archipelago. On 1 March 1945, Willoughby and her charges from MTBRons 20 and 23 arrived off Palawan at Puerto Princesa and began operations. The invading troops of the 8th Army found little opposition awaiting them ashore, and the PT's, patrolling the length of the island, found no Japanese forces afloat.

Off the southern tip of Palawan, however, the PT boats found a small Japanese garrison on the island of Pandanan. The boats repeatedly strafed the Japanese positions, encountering a volume of fire that was initially heavy but that later slackened and finally disappeared. Late in April 1945, a landing party went ashore and found that the Japanese had evacuated. Thus, at the end of April 1945, the PT boats ceased patrols off Palawan.

==== The Borneo campaign ====
Relieved by the motor torpedo boat tender USS Mobjack (AGP-7) at Puerto Princessa on 30 April 1945, Willoughby weighed anchor and sailed for Samar, arriving at PT Base 17 on 2 May 1945. She spent the next eight days steaming to various points in Leyte Gulf, taking on stores in preparation for the expected invasion of Brunei Bay in British North Borneo.

Willoughby returned to Mangarin Bay in company with five merchant ships and two destroyer escorts and then spent the period from 13 May 1945 to 4 June 1945 off Mindoro, tending MTBRons 13 and 16, preparing for the North Borneo operation to come. The tender got underway on 5 June 1945 and on 6 June 1945 arrived at Puerto Princessa, where the PT boats refueled and underwent minor repairs.

Willoughby weighed anchor on 7 June 1945 and headed for Brunei Bay, rendezvousing in Balabac Strait on 8 June 1945 with the Brunei assault force, and continued in company with those warships for the remainder of the voyage toward her objective. Meanwhile, on 9 June 1945, four of her PT boats – USS PT-78, USS PT-81, USS PT-82, and USS PT-84—patrolled the invasion area.

On 10 June 1945, the Australian 9th Division moved ashore at Brunei Bay and pushed inland. Willoughby arrived at Brunei Bay that day and went to general quarters at 0615 hours in preparation for the assault phase of the strikes on Labuan Island, Muara Island, and Pelumpong Split. Shortly thereafter, a lone Japanese plane attacked the formation to which Willoughby was attached and dropped two bombs which splashed into the water without causing any damage.

Willoughby tended MTBRons 13 and 16 in Brunei Bay until August 1945. Early in June, the ship experienced several air raid alerts, and three enemy planes actually entered the area on 14 June 1945. In the meantime, ashore, the Australians were encountering heavy resistance from the Japanese on Labuan Island. The PT boats supporting the campaign destroyed a 60-foot (18 m) sailing vessel and six barges during the first phase of the landings and then ran out of targets afloat. They then machine-gunned and mortared Japanese positions, and at times conducted joint strikes with Royal Australian Air Force planes at Jesselton, Miri, and Kudat, three Japanese-held oil centers on North Borneo.

During her time at Brunei Bay, Willoughby shifted her anchorage on 10 July 1945, moving to a spot off Muara Island, the site of the newly established PT boat base. She remained there for the rest of the war. She lay at Muara Island on 15 August 1945 when word reached her that the Japanese had decided to accept the terms of the Potsdam Declaration. Simultaneously, offensive operations by MTBRons 13 and 16 ceased.

Willoughby earned three battle stars for her World War II service

=== Post-World War II ===
On 24 August 1945, Willoughby got underway for Mindanao to take on a cargo of diesel fuel and arrived at Zamboanga on 26 August 1945. During her passage, she sighted a Japanese horned-type naval mine and destroyed it with gunfire. Willoughby returned to Muara Island at the end of August 1945, encountering en route on 28 August 1945 and sinking another stray Japanese naval mine.

From 30 August 1945 to 8 September 1945, Willoughby tended PT boats off Muara Island before she embarked 38 officers and 318 enlisted men of the Australian 9th Division and loaded 50 tons of supplies on 9 September 1945, at nearby Labuan Island. She got underway on 10 September 1945, bound for Tanjong Po, off the mouth of the Sarawak River. En route, she rendezvoused with six PT boats, which she accompanied for the rest of the passage.

Making arrival on 11 September 1945, 180 troops disembarked from Willoughby and went on board five of the PT boats. The sixth PT boat embarked Captain W. C. Jennings, Commander J. P. Engle, USNR, and Lieutenant Commander A. W. Fargo, USNR, three American naval officers who had been invited to attend the surrender of Japanese forces in North Borneo. Soon, the six PT boats and the Australian corvette HMAS Kapunda headed upriver.

Although the surrender ceremonies had been set for 1400 hours on board Kapunda, the Japanese commander, Major-General Hiyoe Yamamura, reported that he was indisposed to attend. Ordered to show up, however, Yamamura arrived at 1500 hours. The surrender was signed, and the Japanese left Kapunda, at 1600 hours. The six PT boats then proceeded on to Kuching on the Sarawak River and put ashore the first Australian occupation troops.

The next morning, 12 September 1945, Willoughby disembarked the remaining Australian troops to the PT boats and unloaded the 50 tons of stores into two Landing craft tank (LCTs) brought to Tanjong Po for that purpose. On 13 September 1945, 210 former Allied prisoners of war and internees kept at Batu Lintang camp near Kuching embarked in Willoughby. Among the men transferred were two American POWs, enlisted men who had been captured by the Japanese after their ship, the heavy cruiser USS Houston (CA-30, had been sunk in Sunda Strait on 1 March 1942 during the Battle of Sunda Strait. Several stretcher cases went on board the Australian hospital ship Manunda, anchored off Tanjong Po.

Underway on the afternoon of 13 September 1945, Willoughby and her PT boats headed for Labuan Island and, upon her arrival there on the evening of 14 September 1945, discharged all evacuees. Willoughby subsequently made two additional voyages to Kuching, each time transporting Australian troops and relief supplies on the inbound passage and taking out former prisoners of war and internees on the return trip. She made her last visit to Tanjong Po on 23 September 1945, returning to Brunei Bay and anchoring at her usual berth off Muara Island late on 24 September 1945.

Willoughby subsequently returned via the Philippine Islands to the West Coast of the United States, arriving at the Mare Island Navy Yard, Vallejo, California, in early December 1945 for temporary duty there in connection with the repair of vessels at the yard. She continued that duty into 1946.

In the meantime, the United States Coast Guard inspected Willoughby for suitability for use as a weather ship. After Willoughby was classified as "not essential to the defense of the U.S.," she was decommissioned on 26 June 1946 and was simultaneously turned over to the Coast Guard at Government Island, Oakland, California. Her name was struck from the Navy List on 19 July 1946.

== United States Coast Guard service ==
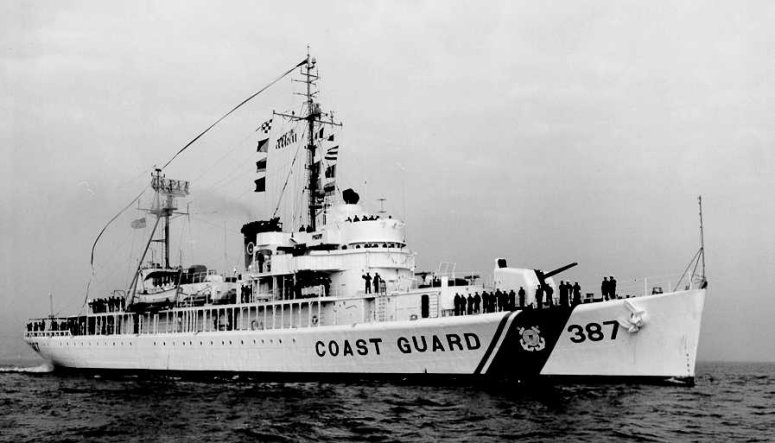
Coast Guard cutter USCGC Gresham (WAVP-387), sometime after the Coast Guard's 1967 adoption of the "racing stripe" markings on its ships.

Barnegat-class ships were very reliable and seaworthy and had good habitability, and the Coast Guard viewed them as ideal for ocean station duty, in which they would perform weather reporting and search and rescue tasks, once they were modified by having a balloon shelter added aft and having oceanographic equipment, an oceanographic winch, and a hydrographic winch installed. After World War II, the Navy transferred 18 of the ships to the Coast Guard, in which they were known as the Casco-class cutters.

After undergoing conversion for use as a weather-reporting ship, the former Willoughby was commissioned into Coast Guard service as USCGC Gresham (WAVP-387) – the third ship of the U.S. Coast Guard or its predecessor, the United States Revenue Cutter Service, to bear the name – on 1 December 1947. During her Coast Guard career, Gresham's primary duty was to serve on weather stations in the Pacific Ocean to gather meteorological data. While on duty in one of these stations, she was required to patrol a 210-square-mile (544-square-kilometer) area for three weeks at a time, leaving the area only when physically relieved by another Coast Guard cutter or in the case of a dire emergency. While on station, she acted as an aircraft check point at the point of no return, a relay point for messages from ships and aircraft, as a source of the latest weather information for passing aircraft, as a floating oceanographic laboratory, and as a search-and-rescue ship for downed aircraft and vessels in distress, and engaged in law enforcement operations. She also served on the Bering Sea Patrol, took part in United States Coast Guard Reserve training cruises, and participated in the U.S. Navy's underway refresher training program to ensure her readiness to support military operations.

=== Pacific service, 1947–1967 ===
Upon commissioning in 1947, Gresham was assigned to the 12th Coast Guard District, with her home port at Alameda, California. Her first ocean station patrol was at Ocean Station Fox, and began with her departure for the patrol on 26 March 1948. For the next few months she conducted naval mine and coastal patrols and served on Ocean Station Fox and Ocean Station Able.

During July 1949, Gresham was among the ships patrolling the Transpacific Yacht Race from Los Angeles, California, to Honolulu, Hawaii. On 9 September 1949 she assisted the British merchant ship SS Pacific Enterprise, which had run aground two nautical miles (3.7 kilometers) north of the Point Arena Light Station in thick fog.

On 8 January 1950 Gresham was assigned to Ocean Station Peter in the Pacific; cutter USCGC Winnebago (WPG-40) relieved her on 29 January 1950. Later in 1950 she served on Ocean Station Nan and Ocean Station Oboe.

In 1951 Gresham served on Ocean Station Uncle and Ocean Station Sugar. On 16 June 1951 the cutter USCGC Chautauqua (WPG-41) relieved her on Ocean Station Sugar, and she proceeded to Yokosuka, Japan. She repeated the cruise from Ocean Station Sugar to Yokosuka in March 1952 and February 1954.

On 22 May 1955, Gresham assisted the merchant ship SS David Thompson, which was adrift in the Pacific. During July 1955 she again escorted the Transpacific Yacht Race.

After several more weather patrols, Gresham departed Alameda on 13 August 1956, for Vancouver, British Columbia, Canada, via Port Angeles, Washington, on a U.S. Coast Guard Reserve training cruise. On 30 September 1956, she was relieved from Ocean Station November by cutter USCGC Pontchartrain (WPG-70). On 17 October 1956, Pontchartrain rescued passengers of Pan American World Airways Flight 6, the Boeing 377 Stratocruiser Sovereign of the Skies, which had ditched in the eastern Pacific during a flight from Honolulu to San Francisco, California; Gresham left Alameda and rendezvoused with Pontchartrain at San Francisco Light Station on 19 October 1956 as Pontchartrain brought in the rescued passengers.

Tragedy struck Gresham on 17 December 1958 while she was relieving the cutter USCGC Klamath (WPG-66) on Ocean Station Romeo. The ships were in a line-ahead formation with Gresham 500 yards (460 m) ahead of Klamath and transferring mail to Klamath when a large wave engulfed Gresham's quarterdeck, injuring 11 enlisted men, inflicting a severe head injury on Ensign George T. Bergman, and washing Bergman overboard. The cutters could not recover Bergman.

During 1959 and 1960, Gresham served on Ocean Station November seven times. During this period, the U.S. Ambassador to the United Nations, Henry Cabot Lodge, arranged for Soviet Premier Nikita Khrushchev to tour San Francisco Bay while Khrushchev was visiting San Francisco during his September 1959 state visit to the United States. Gresham was in port at Alameda at the time, and was chosen to carry Khrushchev on his tour of the bay.

Gresham continued her duties on Ocean Station November throughout the next few years. On 1 May 1966, she was reclassified as a high endurance cutter and redesignated WHEC-387.

=== Vietnam War service, 1967–1968 ===
Gresham departed San Francisco for Pearl Harbor, Hawaii, on 16 April 1967 under the command of Commander Norman L. Scherer, USCG. Upon her arrival in Hawaii, Gresham became flagship of Coast Guard Squadron Three, which was designated Task Unit 70.8.6. Captain John E. Day, commander of the squadron, hoisted his flag aboard Gresham upon activation of the squadron on 24 April 1967.

Coast Guard Squadron Three was tasked to operate in conjunction with U.S. Navy forces in Operation Market Time, the interdiction of North Vietnamese arms and munitions traffic along the coastline of South Vietnam during the Vietnam War. The squadron's other Vietnam War duties included fire support for ground forces, resupplying Coast Guard and Navy patrol boats, and search-and-rescue operations. Serving in the squadron with Gresham were the cutters USCGC Yakutat, USCGC Bering Strait, USCGC Barataria and USCGC Half Moon; like Gresham, they all were Casco-clas cutters and former Navy Barnegat-class ships. They departed Pearl Harbor on 26 April 1967 and reported to Commander, United States Seventh Fleet, for Market Time duty on 4 May 1967. They were joined by U.S. Navy radar picket destroyer escorts (DERs) of Escort Squadrons 5 and 7.

The ten Market Time ships arrived at Subic Bay in the Philippines on 10 May 1967. The five Coast Guard cutters and five Navy destroyer escorts continuously manned four Market Time stations off Vietnam, while only Navy warships served on two Taiwan patrol stations. One ship rotated duty as the station ship in Hong Kong. Gresham remained in the Western Pacific until 28 January 1968 and arrived home at Alameda on 10 February 1968.

=== Pacific service, 1968–1969 ===
Gresham made her final patrol in the Pacific when she served on Ocean Station November in September 1969. On the night of 23 September 1969 she went to the assistance of the 543-foot (166 m) containerized cargo ship SS Hawaiian Legislator, which had lost power in her main propulsion gear and was adrift approximately 70 nautical miles (130 km) south of Gresham's position. After rendezvousing first with the U.S. Navy ammunition ship USS Firedrake to transfer a Coast Guardsman with appendicitis for transport to San Francisco, Gresham went to the aid of Hawaiian Legislator and took her under tow towards San Pedro, California. On 26 September 1969 she turned the tow over to a commercial tug and then set course for San Francisco. She moored at Government Island, Alameda, on 30 September 1969. She was then deactivated and placed in reserve.

=== Atlantic service, 1970–1973 ===
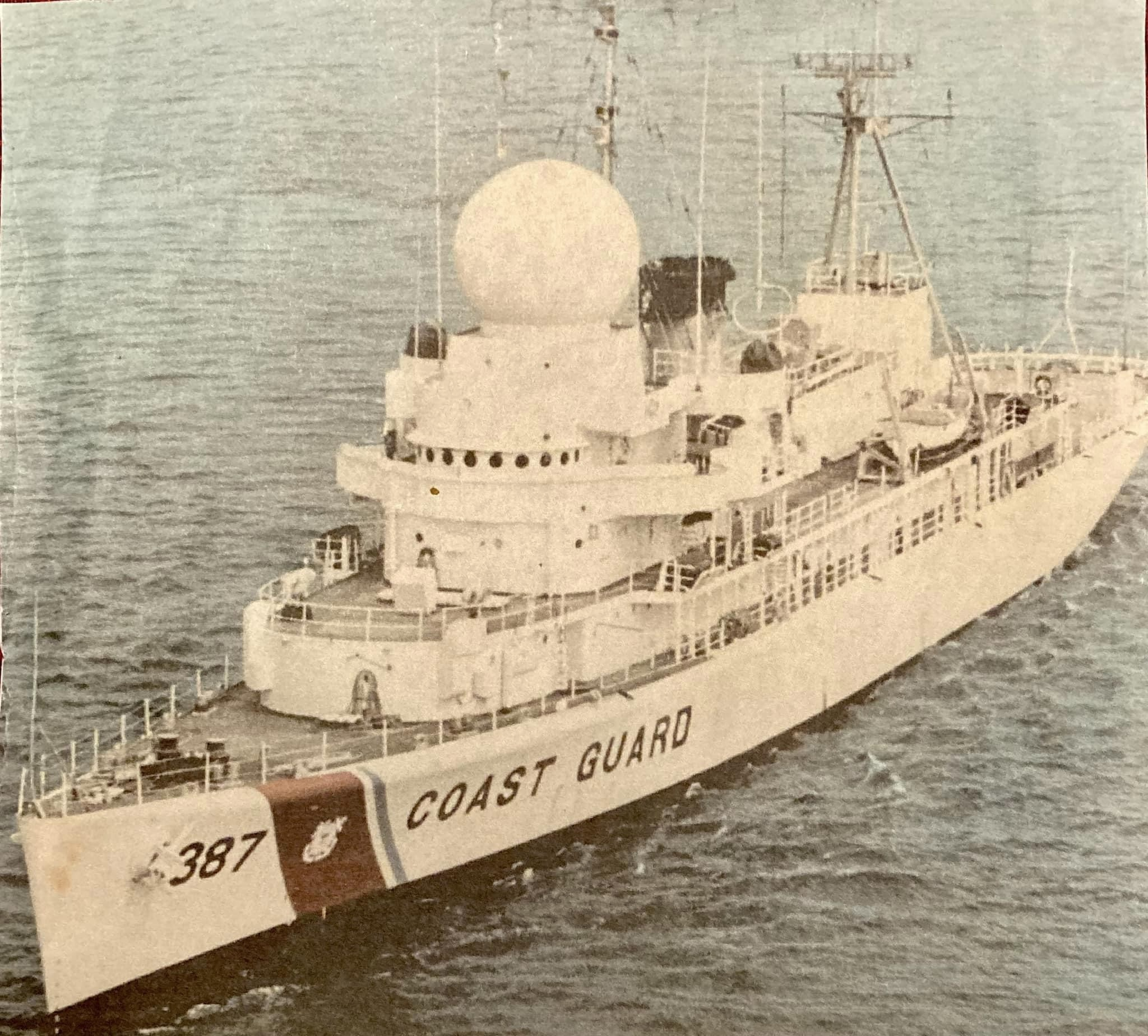
USCGC Gresham (WAGW-387) redesignated a Meteorological Cutter and fitted with a special storm-tracking radar system.

In January 1970 Gresham was reactivated and transferred to the United States East Coast, assigned a new home port at Norfolk, Virginia. She was assigned the duty of establishing a new weather station, Ocean Station Hotel, approximately 250 nautical miles (460 km) northeast of Norfolk and deemed necessary to report critical weather data necessary to improve storm-warning forecasts for the northeastern United States after winter storms in 1969 shut down large areas there; the new XERB-1 weather buoy also was tested at Ocean Station November for use by Gresham at Ocean Station Hotel.

Gresham arrived at Norfolk on 7 February 1970 and established Ocean Station Hotel on 20 February 1970. On 27 February 1970 she redesignated as a Meteorological Cutter WAGW-387 and fitted with a special storm-tracking radar system housed in a distinctive bulbous dome fitted atop her pilot house.

The cutter USCGC Taney replaced Gresham on Ocean Station Hotel early in 1973.

=== Decommissioning and disposal ===
Gresham was decommissioned on 25 April 1973. She was transferred to the Maritime Administration on 21 May 1973 for lay-up in the James River in Virginia. She was sold for scrapping on 25 October 1973 to B. V. Intershitra of Rotterdam, the Netherlands.
