= USCGC Mendota =

USCGC Mendota has been the name of two cutters of the United States Coast Guard:

- USCGC Mendota (1928) was a Lake-class cutter belonging to the United States Coast Guard from 1929 until 1941. Transferred to Royal Navy as HMS Culver (Y87)
- USCGC Mendota (WHEC-69) was an Owasco-class high endurance cutter which served with the United States Coast Guard from 1945 to 1973.
