= Robert S. Lucas =

U.S. Coast Guard admiral

Robert S. Lucas (July 6, 1930 – July 10, 2016) was a rear admiral in the United States Coast Guard.

== Biography ==
Lucas was born on July 6, 1930, in Hutchinson, Kansas. He graduated from Gresham High School in Gresham, Oregon, before graduating from the Massachusetts Institute of Technology.

== Career ==
Lucas graduated from the United States Coast Guard Academy in 1952. He then served aboard USS Forster, USS Vance, USCGC Northwind and USCGC Wachusett.

From 1960 to 1962, Lucas served aboard USCGC Winnebago. He returned to Wachusett to serve as executive officer. In 1967, Lucas assumed command of the cutter. During this time, Wachusett was deployed to serve in the Vietnam War, with Coast Guard Squadron Three as a part of Operation Market Time.

Afterwards, Lucas was stationed in New Orleans, Louisiana. While there, he supervised the construction of USCGC Douglas Munro, USCGC Jarvis, and USCGC Midgett. In 1980, he assumed command of the United States Coast Guard Yard. Afterwards, Lucas became chief of the Office of Engineering of the Coast Guard.

Awards he received during his career include the Navy Presidential Unit Citation, the Coast Guard Unit Commendation, the Bronze Star Medal, the Legion of Merit, the Meritorious Service Medal, the Coast Guard Commendation Medal, the National Defense Service Medal, the Coast Guard Arctic Service Medal, the Vietnam Service Medal, the Vietnamese Gallantry Cross and the Vietnam Campaign Medal.
