= USCGC Pontchartrain =

The following ships of the United States Coast Guard have borne the name USCGC Pontchartrain;

- USCGC Pontchartrain (1928), a Lake-class cutter, transferred to the Royal Navy during World War II and renamed HMS Hartland
- USCGC Pontchartrain (WHEC-70), an Owasco-class cutter in service from 1945 to 1973 and scrapped in 1974
