= USCGC Owasco =

Naval vessel

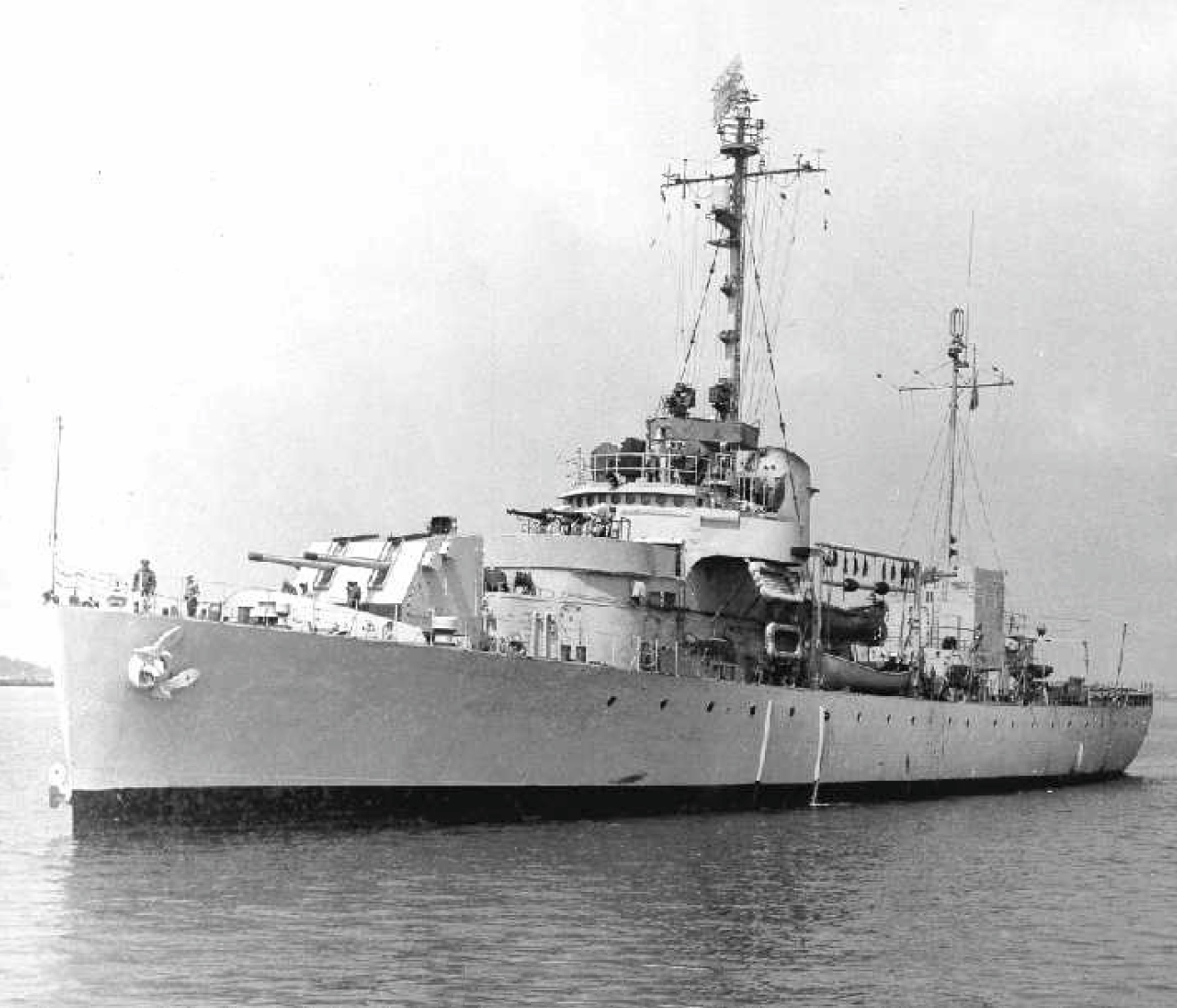
- USCGC Owasco (WHEC-39), off Hawkins Point, 5 May 1946

History

United States
- Builder: Western Pipe & Steel
- Launched: 18 June 1944
- Christened: Owasco
- Commissioned: 18 May 1945
- Decommissioned: 27 June 1973
- Reclassified: WPG-39 to WHEC-39 (1965)
- Honours and awards: World War II Victory Medal; American Area Campaign Medal; National Defense Service Medal; Vietnam Service Medal; Vietnam Campaign
- Fate: Scrapped, 7 October 1974
- Notes: WPS Hull No. 145

General characteristics
- Type: Owasco-class cutter
- Displacement: 1,978 full (1966); 1,342 light (1966)
- Length: 254 ft (77.4 m) oa.; 245 ft (74.7 m) pp.
- Beam: 43 ft 1 in (13.1 m)
- Draft: 17 ft 3 in (5.3 m) (1966)
- Installed power: 4,000 shp (3,000 kW) (1945)
- Propulsion: 1 × Westinghouse electric motor driven by a turbine, (1945)
- Speed: 17 knots (31 km/h; 20 mph).
- Range: 6,157 mi (9,909 km) at 17 knots; 10,376 mi (16,699 km) at 10 knots (19 km/h; 12 mph) (1966)
- Complement: 10 officers, 3 warrants, 130 enlisted (1966)
- Sensors & processing systems: Detection Radar: SPS-23, SPS-29, Mk 26, Mk 27 (1966); Sonar: SQS-1 (1966)
- Armament: 1945: 2 × twin 5 in/38 cal. dual-purpose gun mounts; 2 × quad 40 mm AA gun mounts; 2 × depth charge tracks; 6 × "K" gun depth charge projectors; 1 × Hedgehog projector.; 1966: 1 × 5 in/38 cal. dual-purpose gun mount; 1 × Hedgehog projector
- Notes: Fuel capacity: 141,755 gal (Oil, 95%).

USCG Owasco (WHEC-39) was an Owasco class high endurance cutter which served with the US Coast Guard from 1945 to 1973. Originally intended for World War II service, she was commissioned only weeks before the end of the war and consequently did not see combat until her deployment in the Vietnam War more than 20 years later.

== Peacetime service ==
Owasco, the lead ship in her class, was launched by the Western Pipe and Steel Company at San Pedro, California, on 18 June 1944 and commissioned on 18 May 1945, barely two months before the end of World War II. Initially fitted out as a gunboat, the vessel was converted to peacetime status at the Coast Guard Yard at Curtis Bay, Maryland, through the removal of much of her armament and installation of observation facilities and aerological equipment, a conversion completed in May 1946. Around this time her homeport was changed from Galveston, Texas, to Boston. Owasco was named for Owasco Lake, New York.

=== Regular Coast Guard duties ===
After the refit, Owasco returned to regular Coastguard duties, including law enforcement, ocean station, and search and rescue operations. She was decommissioned in 1951 and recommissioned on 15 August 1955, at which time her homeport was changed to New London, Connecticut, which would remain Owasco's homeport for the rest of her operational career. The Owasco along with the Tamaroa escorted the damaged MV Stockholm back to New York after her collision with the Andrea Doria which caused the Italian ship to eventually capsize. The Stockholm has crushed her bow in the accident

A typical ocean station patrol for Owasco was described in a 1973 unit history: "When the OWASCO leaves New London for ocean station she is heading for a 210 mile square, and once there remains for 28 days obtaining meteorological and oceanographic data and information. A characteristic signal from her radiobeacon serves as an aid to navigation. She also furnished all passing aircraft within radar range accurate information as to their position, course, speed, and up to date weather forecasts. While performing her duties as an Ocean Station Vessel, she carries a crew of 13 officers and 121 men."

=== Storm damaged ===
Owasco was damaged during a series of violent storms in January 1962, when wind gusts at times reached 80 miles an hour. A lifeboat was damaged by a wave and her SPS-29 radar antenna sheared off, while the crew was obliged to work continuously to keep the cutter free from ice. A photo caption from the time noted: "Using muscle power and a baseball bat, a crewman attacks ice formed of spray on the superstructure of the Coast Guard's 255-foot cutter OWASCO during her recent weather patrol and plane guard duty on Ocean Station "Bravo" situated in the passage between Labrador and Greenland. A northeaster picked up spume from high waves and deposited it as ice over the vessel. Crewmen fought this ice battle for ten hours to preserve the ship's stability. They use bats, pick handles, meat cleavers, fire axes, shovels and other objects to crack away the dangerous tons of white weight."

== Vietnam War ==
On 13 October 1967, Owasco was assigned to Coast Guard Squadron Three in South Vietnam. Under the leadership of Commander William R. Fearn and with a crew of 160, Owasco took part in Operation Market Time, the attempt to interdict North Vietnamese supply lines by sea.

Owasco departed New London 20 May 1968 for Guantanamo Bay, where her crew underwent refresher training. She then made ports stops at Hawaii, Guam and Subic Bay before arriving in theatre on 23 July of the same year.

Owasco's operational duties in this period were described by a contemporary Coast Guard press release:

Although her patrol areas may change from time to time during the next several months, her duties will not. Market Time units are assigned primarily to keep the Communists from sneaking men, arms and other supplies into the Republic of Vietnam. They include U.S. Navy aircraft, destroyer escort radar picket ships, ocean minesweepers and swift boats and Vietnamese Navy Junk Force craft, as well as 82-foot and high endurance Coast Guard cutters. Owasco is one of five of the latter group, which makes up Coast Guard Squadron Three on duty with the Seventh Fleet's Cruiser-Destroyer Group in Southeast Asia. In addition to keeping track of shipping in their patrol areas and inspecting and searching suspicious water craft and their occupants, Market Time units are often called upon to lend gunfire support to friendly forces ashore. Owasco's 5 inch,.38 caliber main battery is well suited to shore bombardment and she also carries 81 mm mortars and.50 caliber machine guns for close range engagements with the enemy.

Owasco's first Market Time patrol began on 10 August 1968 just south of the Vietnamese Demilitarized Zone in the South China Sea. From 13 September to 3 October 1968 the vessel operated as the SOPA Administrator for all U.S. Naval vessels in Hong Kong, maintaining the shore patrol for the fleet and handling all mail, communications, and matters concerning U.S. naval personnel there. On 1 October 1968, Owasco departed for Subic Bay for a regular upkeep.

=== Crew citation ===
A few weeks later in November, Owasco crewmen went to the aid of a Navy Swift boat in an incident that was described in the ships official cutter scrapbook:

Six Owasco crewmen were cited for meritorious service as a result of direct action with the enemy, while the ship was patrolling Market Time Area Two on Wednesday 6 November 1968. The six men had just completed a medcap mission ashore in Phouctan...Embarked in Navy Swift Boat PCF-75 for rendezvous with the Owasco, the boat, in company with the ill-fated PCF-70, received hostile gunfire during which PCF-70 personnel were hit from a surprise recoilless rifle ambush on the beach. Two men were killed and four others wounded. LCDR Spott USPHS (medical officer) and SN Maison (corpsman assistant) rendered medical aid in the midst of the enemy attack. Four other Owasco men, LTJG Mack, BM2 Scheyer, DC3 Bane, EM3 Switlik all assisted in rescue and salvage operations to the battle damaged Navy craft. For their achievement under fire, Doctor Spott and seaman Maison received Navy Commendation medals, while the other four were cited in Letters of Commendation by Commander, 7th Fleet. On 19 June 1969, LTJG Warren Hudson USN, the PCF-70 skipper who was wounded in the action, visited the Owasco in New London to express his thanks to the commanding officer.

Owasco returned to Subic Bay for emergency dry dock repairs between 15 and 25 January. Between 26 January and 11 March the vessel was back on Market Time Station One duty. On 14 March 1969 Owasco departed Subic for her home port of New London, but on the way was diverted for a medevac mission for crew members of the Norwegian M/V Norefjell 300 miles southeast of Cape Hatteras, after which she resumed her journey, arriving at New London on the 23rd.

=== Summary of Vietnam War service ===
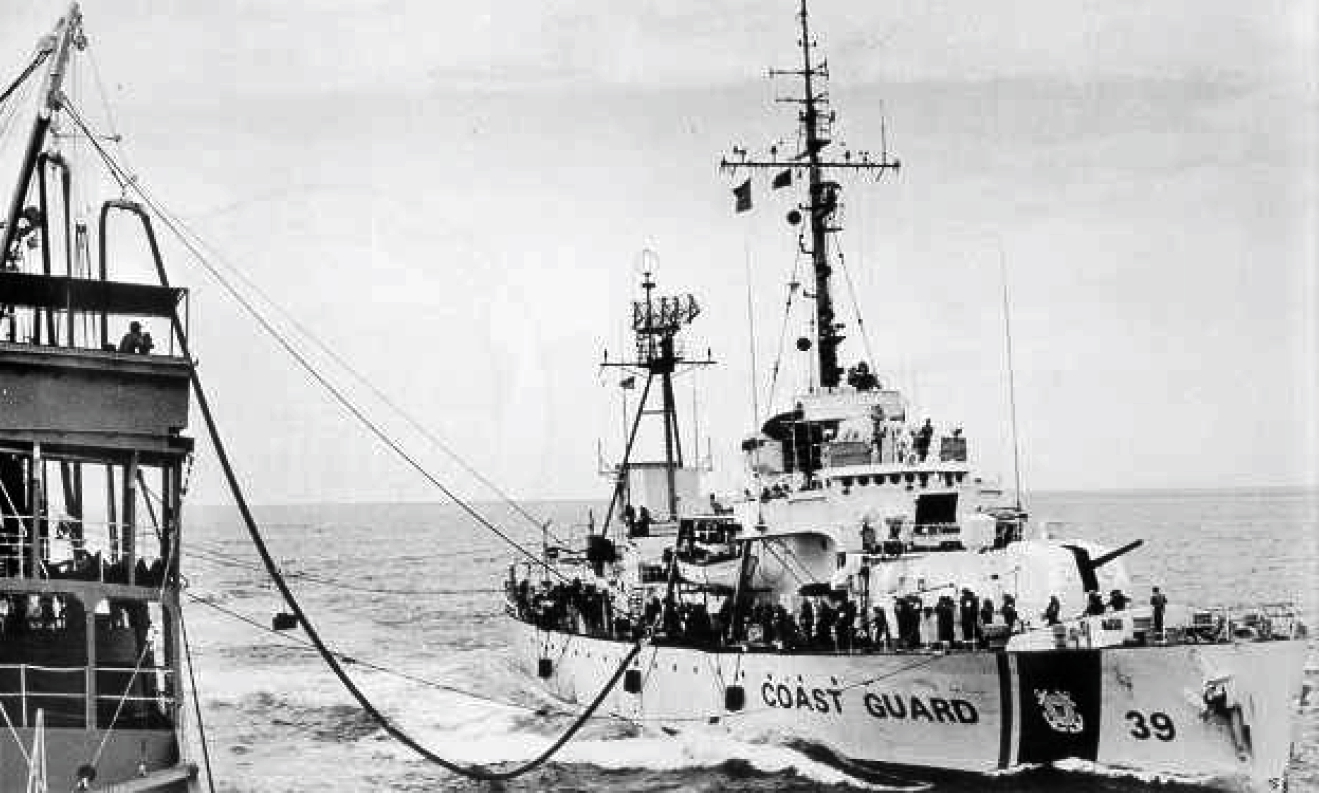
Owasco replenishing while underway with USS Guadalupe. Note the single barrel 5"/38 instead of the original twin 5"/38.

By the end of her tour overseas, Owasco had supplied logistical support to 86 Navy Swift boats and 47 Coast Guard 82-foot patrol boats. She had detected 2,596 junks and conducted 178 "actual boardings and 2,341 inspections", exceeding the "results of any Squadron Three cutter thus far." She conducted 17 Naval Gunfire Support Missions, firing 1,330 rounds of 5-inch ammunition."

Owasco was officially credited with killing four enemy soldiers, destroying 18 bunkers and damaging 10, destroying 11 "military structures" and damaging 17, destroying 550 meters of "Enemy Supply Trails", destroying 1 sampan, 1 loading pier, and interdicting 3 "Enemy Troop Movements." The ship carried out 49 underway replenishments while in theatre and her medical personnel carried out 7 medical and civic action programs (MEDCAP), treating 432 Vietnamese civilians.

== Return to peacetime service ==
On her return to New London, Owasco resumed peacetime operations. After refresher training at Guantanamo Bay in 1972, during which the vessel earned a second consecutive "E" for excellence in operational readiness, she returned to her home port in December of the same year. Owasco was decommissioned on 27 June 1973 and sold for scrap on 7 October 1974.
