= USCGC Iroquois =

- USCGC Iriquois (WHEC-43), 1949

History

United States
- Builder: Western Pipe & Steel
- Launched: 22 October 1944
- Christened: Iroquois
- Commissioned: 9 February 1946
- Decommissioned: 13 January 1965
- Reclassified: WPG-43 to WHEC-43
- Fate: Sold for scrap, 1 June 1965
- Notes: WPS Hull No. 149.

General characteristics
- Type: Owasco-class cutter
- Displacement: 1,978 full (1966); 1,342 light (1966)
- Length: 254 ft (77.4 m) oa.; 245 ft (74.7 m) pp.
- Beam: 43 ft 1 in (13.1 m)
- Draft: 17 ft 3 in (5.3 m) (1966)
- Installed power: 4,000 shp (3,000 kW) (1945)
- Propulsion: 1 × Westinghouse electric motor driven by a turbine, (1945)
- Speed: 17 knots (31 km/h; 20 mph).
- Range: 6,157 mi (9,909 km) at 17 knots; 10,376 mi (16,699 km) at 10 knots (19 km/h; 12 mph) (1966)
- Complement: 10 officers, 3 warrants, 130 enlisted (1966)
- Sensors & processing systems: Detection Radar: SPS-23, SPS-29, Mk 26, Mk 27 (1966); Sonar: SQS-1 (1966)
- Armament: 1945: 2 × twin 5 in/38 cal. dual-purpose gun mounts; 2 × quad 40 mm AA gun mounts; 2 × depth charge tracks; 6 × "K" gun depth charge projectors; 1 × Hedgehog projector.; 1966: 1 × 5 in/38 cal. dual purpose gun mount; 1 × Hedgehog projector
- Notes: Fuel capacity: 141,755 gal (Oil, 95%).

USCGC Iroquois (WHEC-43) was an Owasco-class high-endurance cutter built for World War II service with the United States Coast Guard. The war ended before the ship was completed and consequently she never saw wartime service.

Iroquois was built by Western Pipe & Steel at the company's San Pedro shipyard. Named after Lake Iroquois (Vermont), she was commissioned as a patrol gunboat with ID number WPG-43 on 9 February 1946. Her ID was later changed to WHEC-43 (HEC for "High Endurance Cutter" - the "W" signifies a Coast Guard vessel).

== Operational history ==
Iroquois was assigned to Honolulu, Hawaii. In February 1951 she served on Ocean Station Nan; July through August 1951 she served on Ocean Station Uncle; October–November 1951 she served on Ocean Station Victor; in January 1952 she served on Ocean Station Uncle; June 1952 she served on Ocean Station Queen; From December 1952 through January 1953 she served on Ocean Station Victor; In February 1953 on Ocean Station Sugar; in June–July 1953 on Ocean Station Queen; in August 1953 she served on Ocean Station Queen.

=== Run aground with major damage ===
While departing Midway on 29 June 1954 Iriquois ran aground on a reef. She was refloated on 1 July but had sustained major damage to her hull. She was towed to the Coast Guard Yard, decommissioned and stored through 13 January 1965. Both of her boiler burners were removed and installed on board her sister cutter, Escanaba. Iroquois was eventually sold for scrap.
