= USCGC Sebago (WHEC-42) =

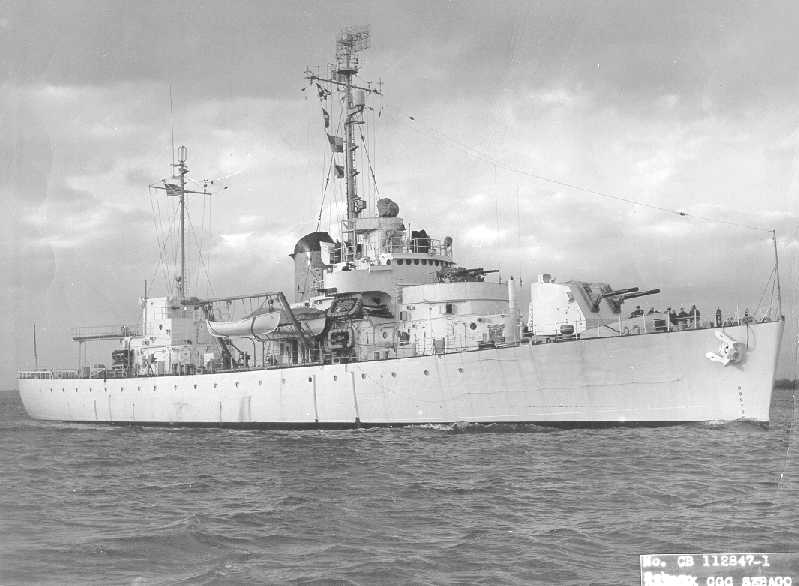
- USCGC Sebago (WHEC-42) as seen on 28 November 1947. At this time she was still fitted with her heavy World War II-era armament of twin 5"/38-caliber gun turrets, which are clearly visible

History

United States
- Builder: Western Pipe & Steel
- Laid down: 7 June 1943
- Launched: 28 May 1944
- Christened: Wachusett
- Commissioned: 20 September 1945
- Decommissioned: 29 February 1972
- Reclassified: WPG-42 to WHEC-42
- Fate: Scrapped, 1974
- Notes: WPS Hull No. 148.; Sponsor: Mrs. Margaret P. Steinmetz.

General characteristics
- Type: Owasco-class cutter
- Displacement: 1,978 full (1966); 1,342 light (1966)
- Length: 254 ft (77.4 m) oa.; 245 ft (74.7 m) pp.
- Beam: 43 ft 1 in (13.1 m)
- Draft: 17 ft 3 in (5.3 m) (1966)
- Installed power: 4,000 shp (3,000 kW) (1945)
- Propulsion: 1 × Westinghouse electric motor driven by a turbine, (1945)
- Speed: 17 knots (31 km/h; 20 mph).
- Range: 6,157 mi (9,909 km) at 17 knots; 10,376 mi (16,699 km) at 10 knots (19 km/h; 12 mph) (1966)
- Complement: 10 officers, 3 warrants, 130 enlisted (1966)
- Sensors & processing systems: Detection Radar: SPS-23, SPS-29, Mk 26, Mk 27 (1966); Sonar: SQS-1 (1966)
- Armament: 1945: 2 × twin 5 in/38 cal. dual-purpose gun mounts; 2 × quad 40 mm AA gun mounts; 2 × depth charge tracks; 6 × "K" gun depth charge projectors; 1 × Hedgehog projector.; 1966: 1 × 5 in/38 cal. dual-purpose gun mount; 1 × Hedgehog projector
- Notes: Fuel capacity: 141,755 gal (Oil, 95%).

USCG Sebago (WHEC-42) was an Owasco class high endurance cutter which served with the US Coast Guard from 1945 to 1972. Originally intended for World War II service, she was not commissioned until a month after the end of hostilities and consequently did not see combat until her deployment in the Vietnam War more than 20 years later.

Sebago was built by Western Pipe & Steel at the company's San Pedro shipyard. Named after Sebago Lake, Maine, she was commissioned as a patrol gunboat with ID number WPG-42 on 20 September 1945. Her ID was later changed to WHEC-42 (HEC for "High Endurance Cutter" - the "W" signifies a Coast Guard vessel).

== First commission ==
Sebago was initially stationed at San Francisco, California but was transferred soon thereafter to Norfolk, Virginia, where she served out of from 1 November 1945 to 1 June 1946. Here she was used for law enforcement, ocean station, and search and rescue operations. She was then stationed at Boston, Massachusetts, from 1 June 1946 to 15 August 1947 and at Staten Island, New York, from 15 August 1947 to 31 October 1949. Her duties remained similar to those she had while stationed at Norfolk and included weather patrols. From 10 January to 31 January 1948 she served at Weather Station Able. In April of that same year, she was serving on a Weather Station Dog, some 380 miles off Newfoundland.

On the night of 27 April a C-47, MATS flight 6396, ditched near the cutter and the Sebago rescued the C-47s crew of four. Sebago was decommissioned on 31 October 1949 and stored at the Coast Guard Yard, Curtis Bay, Maryland.

== Second commission ==
Sebago was recommissioned on 17 December 1952 and stationed at Boston until 1 July 1954. The vessel was subsequently moved to Mobile, Alabama, where she was used for law enforcement, search and rescue, and Campeche Patrol until July 1964. This patrol was off the Campeche Bank near Mexico's Yucatan Peninsula, where Mexican and U.S. fishing vessels fished for shrimp. A Coast Guard press release noted that "On patrol, the SEBAGO is ever ready to render medical aid, assist disabled boats through effecting repairs or provide a tow into port. An active boarding program is executed while on Campeche Patrol, evidenced by the 236 vessels [boarded] during fiscal year 1958." On 7 July 1959 the Sebago collided with the USNS Croatan at the U.S. Naval Station at Algiers, Louisiana.

During fiscal year 1959, the Sebago cruised some 20,000 miles on twelve patrols. She completed twenty-two assistance missions, saved a half-million dollars' worth of shipping and obtained medical care for four sick or injured seamen. In addition to two training cruises for Coast Guard Reserve personnel with visits to Nassau and Jamaica, West Indies, on a visit to Texas for a shrimp festival, and the completion of one hundred forty-six vessel boardings during the fiscal year 1959. The cutter also completed her annual overhaul in the Coast Guard Yard at Curtis Bay, Maryland, in February 1959.

In January, 1960, Sebago completed underway refresher training at the Navy Fleet Training Group at Guantanamo Bay, Cuba, training undertaken by most cutters every two years. On 2 January 1962, she towed the disabled M/V Catalina 310 miles off New Orleans, Louisiana. From July 1964 to 29 February 1972, she was stationed at Pensacola, Florida, and again added ocean station duties to her agenda but she no longer served on Campeche Patrol. Her ocean station assignments included patrolling at stations Hotel, Bravo, Charlie, Echo, and Delta.

On 15 October 1964 a fire broke out in her engine room that caused $50,000 worth of damage. The fire was extinguished by Sebago crewmen with assistance from the Pensacola Naval Air Station Fire Department, personnel from the USS Tweedy, the Sherman Field crash trucks, and the Air Station harbor tugs. In late 1964, Sebago repaired the F/V Robbie Dale near Cayos Acras. On 18 December 1966, she helped fight the fire at Frisco Pier, Pensacola.

== Vietnam War service ==
Sebago was refurbished at a cost of $179,000 at the Alabama Drydock and Shipbuilding Company from 29 September to 31 October 1968 in preparation for assignment to Vietnam.

Combat operations

Sebago was assigned to Coast Guard Squadron Three, South Vietnam, serving in theatre from 2 March to 16 November 1969, while under the command of CDR Dudley C. Goodwin, USCG. She was assigned to support Operation Market Time, including the interdiction of North Vietnamese supplies heading south by water and naval gunfire support [NGS] of units ashore. By July 1969, she had conducted 12 NGS missions, destroying 31 structures, 15 bunkers, 2 sampans and 3 enemy huts.

Humanitarian missions

Sebago's medical staff, including the cutter's doctor, Public Health Service LT Lewis J. Wyatt, conducted humanitarian missions in South Vietnam, treating over 400 villagers "for a variety of ills." The crew visited the village of Co Luy, 80 miles (130 km) south of Da Nang, and built an 18-foot extension to a waterfront pier for the villagers. She also served as a supply ship for Coast Guard and Navy patrol boats serving in Vietnamese coastal waters.

== Return to peacetime duties ==
On 18 and 19 December 1969, Sebago placed a damage-control party on board M/V Jody Re, brought the flooding under control, and stood by until a commercial tug arrived. On 20 December 1969, she stood by the grounded Danish M/V Helle 25 miles northeast of Cabo Falso until a commercial tug arrived. On 21 June 1970, while adjusting compasses, she grounded during a squall outside Norfolk, VA.

== Decommissioning ==
Sebago was decommissioned on 29 February 1972 at Pensacola. Her commanding officer at that time, CDR James G. Wilcox, also retired that day. The cutter was turned over to the U.S. Maritime Administration in April of that same year, and scrapped in 1974.
