= USS Concord (SP-773) =

Tugboat of the United States Navy

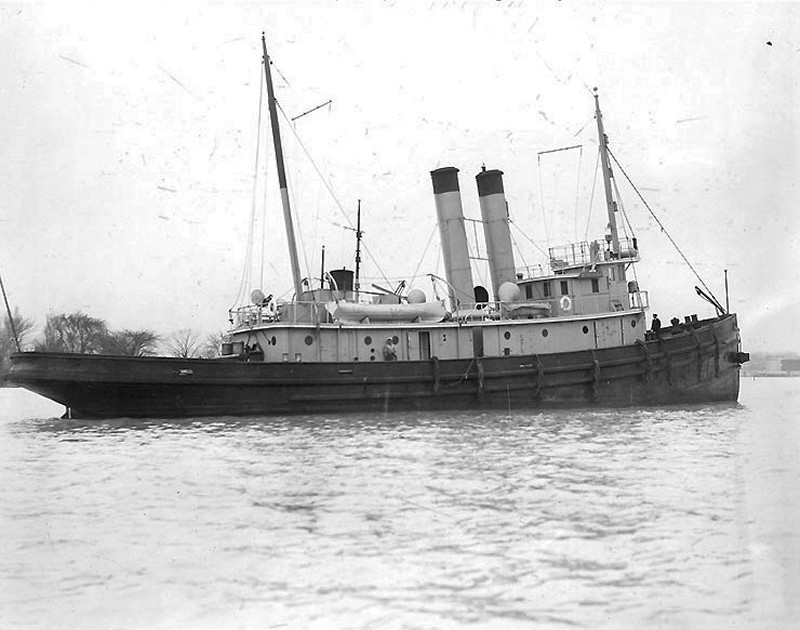
- USS Muscotah (YT-33) off the Washington Navy Yard, District of Columbia, circa 1932-1934.

History

United States
- Name: USS Concord
- Namesake: A town in Massachusetts
- Owner: Staples Transportation Company of New York City
- Builder: Charles Hillman, Philadelphia, Pennsylvania
- Laid down: date unknown
- Completed: 1898
- Acquired: by the Navy 22 September 1917
- Commissioned: 20 November 1917 as USS Concord (SP 773)
- Decommissioned: circa November 1919
- In service: December 1919 at the Washington Navy Yard
- Out of service: 4 November 1934
- Renamed: USS Mendota (YT 33), 20 November 1920; later renamed Muscotah
- Reclassified: USS Muscotah (YT-33)
- Homeport: Brest, France; Washington Navy Yard
- Fate: Sold 30 April 1937; fate unknown

General characteristics
- Type: Tugboat
- Tonnage: 353 tons
- Length: 140 ft (43 m)
- Beam: 26 ft (7.9 m)
- Draft: 11 ft (3.4 m)
- Propulsion: not known
- Speed: 12 knots
- Complement: 36 officers and enlisted
- Armament: One 3-inch gun

USS Concord (SP-773), later known as USS Mendota (YT-33) and again later as USS Muscotah (YT-33) was a tugboat acquired by the U.S. Navy during World War I. Concord was initially assigned to North Atlantic towing duties, and later was assigned as harbor tug at the Washington Navy Yard. She was sold in 1937.

== Constructed in Philadelphia ==
The third ship to be so named by the U.S. Navy, Concord (No. 773) was built in 1898 by Charles Hillman, Philadelphia, Pennsylvania; purchased by the Navy 22 September 1917; outfitted by Boston Navy Yard; and commissioned 20 November 1917.

She was renamed and reclassified Mendota (YT-33) on 20 November 1920, and her name was again changed on 30 January 1932 to Muscotah.

== World War I service ==
Concord sailed from Philadelphia 15 December 1917 for Bermuda where she joined Galatia and Gypsum Queen to tow three French submarine chasers to Ponta Delgada, Azores. She continued to Brest, France, arriving 22 February 1918 for service as harbor tug until 25 October 1919.

She returned to Norfolk, Virginia, 28 November, and the next month reported to Washington Navy Yard where she was placed "in service" and served as a harbor tug.

== Final decommissioning ==
She was placed out of service 4 November 1934 and sold 30 April 1937.
