= USCGC Wachusett (WHEC-44) =

- USCGC Wachusett (WHEC-44), 1966

History

United States
- Builder: Western Pipe & Steel
- Laid down: July 3rd 1944
- Launched: November 5th 1944
- Christened: Huron
- Commissioned: March 23rd 1946
- Decommissioned: August 30th 1973
- Reclassified: WPG-44 to WHEC-44
- Fate: Sold for scrap, 18 November 1974
- Notes: WPS Hull No. 150.

General characteristics
- Type: Owasco-class cutter
- Displacement: 1,978 full (1966); 1,342 light (1966)
- Length: 254 ft (77.4 m) oa.; 245 ft (74.7 m) pp.
- Beam: 43 ft 1 in (13.1 m)
- Draft: 17 ft 3 in (5.3 m) (1966)
- Installed power: 4,000 shp (3,000 kW) (1945)
- Propulsion: 1 × Westinghouse electric motor driven by a turbine, (1945)
- Speed: 17 knots (31 km/h; 20 mph).
- Range: 6,157 mi (9,909 km) at 17 knots; 10,376 mi (16,699 km) at 10 knots (19 km/h; 12 mph) (1966)
- Complement: 10 officers, 3 warrants, 130 enlisted (1966)
- Sensors & processing systems: Detection Radar: SPS-23, SPS-29, Mk 26, Mk 27 (1966); Sonar: SQS-1 (1966)
- Armament: 1945: 2 × twin 5 in/38 cal. dual-purpose gun mounts; 2 × quad 40 mm AA gun mounts; 2 × depth charge tracks; 6 × "K" gun depth charge projectors; 1 × Hedgehog projector.; 1966: 1 × 5 in/38 cal. dual-purpose gun mount; 1 × Hedgehog projector
- Notes: Fuel capacity: 141,755 gal (Oil, 95%).

USCGC Wachusett (WHEC-44) was an Owasco-class high endurance cutter built for World War II service with the United States Coast Guard. She was commissioned too late for service in that war and consequently did not see wartime service until the Vietnam War.

Wachusett was built by Western Pipe & Steel at the company's San Pedro shipyard. Named after Wachusett Lake, Massachusetts, she was commissioned as a patrol gunboat with ID number WPG-44 on 23 March 1946. Her ID was later changed to WHEC-44 (HEC for "High Endurance Cutter" - the "W" signifies a Coast Guard vessel).

== Peacetime service ==
Wachusett was originally named Huron. Throughout 1946, she was stationed at Port Angeles, Washington, and used for law enforcement, ocean station, and search and rescue operations in the Pacific. For the next two years, she was homeported at Juneau, Alaska, and added Bering Sea patrol to the list of her duties.

From 1949 to 30 August 1973, she was stationed at Seattle, Washington, and returned to her initial three major areas of operations. On 12 May 1957, she rescued two crew members from a USAF B-57 when they bailed out between Honolulu and San Francisco. On 11 February 1958, she assisted the tug USS Yuma in towing the USS Tinian 10 miles west-southwest of Cape Flattery. On 14 April 1964, Wachusett rescued four persons from F/V Mary Carol east of Chiniak Bay, Alaska .

Wachusett stood by the disabled Chinese MV Taihsing in the North Pacific from 18 to 22 May 1964 until a commercial tug arrived. On 19 August 1964, she located the barge Lumberjack adrift off California. On 5 June 1965, she seized the Japanese FV Wakashio Maru for violation of the 1953 International Fishing Convention east of 175°W.

== Vietnam War ==
Wachusett was assigned to Coast Guard Squadron Three, South Vietnam, from 10 September 1968 to 1 June 1969.

== Decommissioning ==
The ship was decommissioned on 30 August 1973 and sold for scrap on November 18, 1974. U.S. Coast Guard machinery mate Russell E. Humphrey was one of the ship crew who helped decommission (WHEC 44).
