= USCGC Chautauqua =

US Coast Guard naval vessel

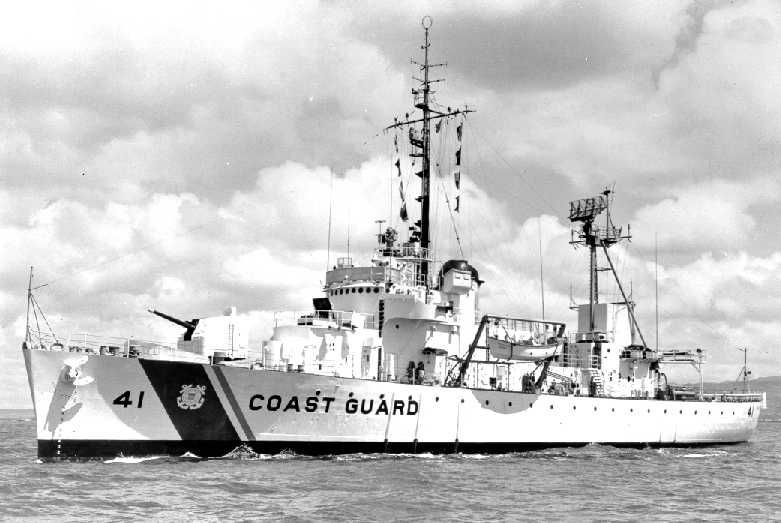
- USCGC Chautauqua (WHEC-41) underway off Honolulu, 1968

History

United States
- Builder: Western Pipe & Steel
- Launched: 14 May 1944
- Christened: Chautauqua
- Commissioned: 4 August 1945
- Decommissioned: 1 August 1973
- Reclassified: WPG-41 to WHEC-41
- Fate: Scrapped, 1974
- Notes: WPS Hull No. 147

General characteristics
- Type: Owasco-class cutter
- Displacement: 1,978 full (1966); 1,342 light (1966)
- Length: 254 ft (77.4 m) oa.; 245 ft (74.7 m) pp.
- Beam: 43 ft 1 in (13.1 m)
- Draft: 17 ft 3 in (5.3 m) (1966)
- Installed power: 4,000 shp (3,000 kW) (1945)
- Propulsion: 1 × Westinghouse electric motor driven by a turbine (1945)
- Speed: 17 knots (31 km/h; 20 mph).
- Range: 6,157 mi (9,909 km) at 17 knots; 10,376 mi (16,699 km) at 10 knots (19 km/h; 12 mph) (1966)
- Complement: 10 officers, 3 warrants, 130 enlisted (1966)
- Sensors & processing systems: Detection Radar: SPS-23, SPS-29, Mk 26, Mk 27 (1966); Sonar: SQS-1 (1966)
- Armament: 1945: 2 × twin 5 in/38 cal. dual-purpose gun mounts; 2 × quad 40 mm AA gun mounts; 2 × depth charge tracks; 6 × "K" gun depth charge projectors; 1 × Hedgehog projector.; 1966: 1 × 5 in/38 cal. dual purpose gun mount; 1 × Hedgehog projector
- Notes: Fuel capacity: 141,755 gal (Oil, 95%).

USCG Chautauqua (WHEC-41) was an Owasco-class high endurance cutter which served with the US Coast Guard from 1945 to 1973. Originally intended for World War II service, she was commissioned only days before the end of hostilities and consequently never saw combat.

Chautauqua was built by Western Pipe & Steel at the company's San Pedro shipyard. Named after Chautauqua Lake, New York she was commissioned as a patrol gunboat with ID number WPG-41 on 4 August 1945, just days before the end of World War II. In the postwar period, her ID was changed to WHEC-41 (HEC for "High Endurance Cutter" - the "W" signifies a Coast Guard vessel).

== Operational service ==
Chautauqua was homeported at San Francisco, California, from 4 August 1945 to October 1948 and used for law enforcement, ocean station, and search and rescue operations in the Pacific.

On 19 May 1947 she searched for a reported mine. From October 1948 to 22 July 1954, she was stationed at Alameda, California. Her duties remained similar to those she had at San Francisco. On 29 and 30 October 1948, she escorted the disabled F/V Reefer King to Honolulu, Hawaii. From 11 to 14 November 1949, she towed the disabled M/V Navigator until relieved by a commercial tug. From 15 to 21 April 1950, she towed the disabled tug Omar to San Francisco. On 15 May 1953, she assisted the disabled F/V Bering Strait 20 miles west of Point Reyes, California.

Chautauqua was homeported at Honolulu, Hawaii, from 22 July 1954 to February 1972, with duties of law enforcement, ocean station, and search and rescue. On 21 November 1956, she medevaced a crewman from M/V Evibelle. On 13 July 1959, she assisted the yacht Cloud Nine at 23°20’N, 143°00’W. She patrolled the Trans-Pacific Race from 15 to 17 July 1959. On 6 September 1959, she medevaced a crewman from M/V Pioneer Mart at 34°25’N, 162°16’E. While on ocean station in February 1965, the Chautauqua sustained damage and had to depart early for Yokosuka, Japan due to main motor-bearing problems.

On 20 January 1967, Chautauqua sustained a fire in the Combat Information Center while undergoing renovation in a San Francisco yard. In late December 1971, Chautauqua was on-scene commander following the sinking of the Danish M/V Heering Kirse off Midway Island. 31 of 36 victims were rescued. She transferred to Norfolk, Virginia, in February 1972.

== Decommission ==
Chautauqua was decommissioned on 1 August 1973 and scrapped along with the rest of the Owasco class in 1974.
