= USCGC Minnetonka =

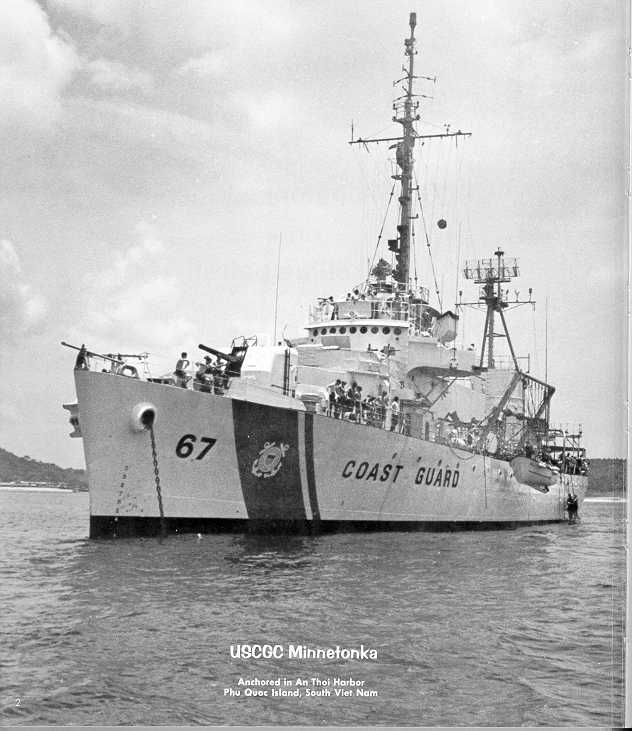
- USCGC Minnetonka (WHEC-67), at anchor in An Thoi Harbor, Phu Quoc Island, South Vietnam.

History

United States
- Name: Minnetonka
- Operator: United States Coast Guard
- Builder: Western Pipe & Steel
- Launched: 2 November 1945
- Christened: Sunapee
- Acquired: 11 July 1946
- Commissioned: 11 July 1946
- Decommissioned: 31 May 1974
- Fate: Scrapped, 1974

General characteristics
- Class & type: Owasco-class cutter
- Displacement: 1,978 full (1966); 1,342 light (1966)
- Length: 254 ft (77.4 m) oa.; 245 ft (74.7 m) pp.
- Beam: 43 ft 1 in (13.1 m)
- Draft: 17 ft 3 in (5.3 m) (1966)
- Installed power: 4,000 shp (3,000 kW) (1945)
- Propulsion: 1 × Westinghouse electric motor driven by a turbine, (1945)
- Speed: 17 knots (31 km/h; 20 mph).
- Range: 6,157 mi (9,909 km) at 17 knots; 10,376 mi (16,699 km) at 10 knots (19 km/h; 12 mph) (1966)
- Complement: 10 officers, 3 warrants, 130 enlisted (1966)
- Sensors & processing systems: Detection Radar: SPS-23, SPS-29, Mk 26, Mk 27 (1966); Sonar: SQS-1 (1966)
- Armament: 1945: 2 × twin 5 in/38 cal. dual-purpose gun mounts; 2 × quad 40 mm AA gun mounts; 2 × depth charge tracks; 6 × "K" gun depth charge projectors; 1 × Hedgehog projector.; 1966: 1 × 5 in/38 cal. dual-purpose gun mount; 1 × Hedgehog projector
- Notes: Fuel capacity: 141,755 gal (Oil, 95%).

USCGC Minnetonka (WHEC-67) was an Owasco class high endurance cutter built for World War II service with the United States Coast Guard. The war ended before the ship was completed and consequently Minnetonka did not see wartime service until the Vietnam War.

Minnetonka was built by Western Pipe & Steel at the company's San Pedro shipyard. Originally christened Sunapee, she was renamed after Lake Minnetonka, Minnesota, and commissioned as a patrol gunboat with ID number WPG-67 on 11 July 1946. Her ID was later changed to WHEC-67 (HEC for "High Endurance Cutter" - the "W" signifies a Coast Guard vessel).

== Peacetime service ==
Minnetonka was stationed at San Pedro, CA, from 20 September 1946 to 7 March 1951. She was used for law enforcement, ocean station, and search and rescue operations in the Pacific.

On 2 and 3 January 1951, Minnetonka assisted MV Keisin Maru at 38°41’N, 152°00’E. From 23 to 15 January 1951, she assisted MV Oregon Mail at 46°35’N, 166°34’E. From 7 March 1951 to 31 May 1974, Minnetonka was homeported at Long Beach, California, and used for the same duties as listed above. On 8 September 1954, she assisted FV American at 33°08’N, 120°44’W. From 6 to 8 May 1955, she patrolled the Ensenada Race. On 24 August 1956, she towed the disabled schooner Atlantic to Kodiak, Alaska. On 8 November 1957, she searched for the Pan-American stratocruiser Romance of the Skies between San Francisco and Honolulu. 19 bodies were recovered on the sixth day of the search.

On 8 July 1959, Minnetonka towed the disabled FV Ruth K to Long Beach, California. On 17 and 18 December 1959, she assisted MV Guam Pioneer at 31°23’N, 124°37’W. On 28 and 19 August 1961, she towed the disabled FV Alaska Reefer to Port Townsend, Washington. On 11 and 12 February 1962, she assisted FV Western Fisher. Minnetonka served on reserve cruise from 10 to 13 August 1962. On 30 July 1967, Minnetonka rescued six people from FV Sea Boy off California.

== Vietnam war ==
Minnetonka was assigned to Coast Guard Squadron Three, South Vietnam, from 5 January to 29 September 1968. On the night of 29 February/1 March, she forced an enemy trawler, attempting to resupply the Viet Cong near Qui Nhon, to abandon its mission. During her 305-day deployment, the Minnetonka was called in for 51 Naval Gunfire Support missions to support both U.S. and Vietnamese troops ashore. She fired a total 4,684 rounds of 5 in (130 mm)/38 ammunition, consisting of high-explosive, white phosphorus, and illumination projectiles during these missions. The Minnetonka had 49 underway replenishments, receiving food, ammunition, mail, and personnel during her deployment to Southeast Asia. She steamed total of 59,685 miles, leaving Long Beach, California on 17 December 1967 and returning on 17 October 1968.

== Return to peacetime service ==
After her stint in Vietnam, Minnetonka returned to peacetime service until her decommissiong a few years later.

A fatal accident occurred on 20 June 1972. One person was killed and two were seriously injured when a hot-water heater exploded while the cutter was in Long Beach.

== Decommissioning ==
Minnetonka was decommissioned on 31 May 1974 and was laid-up at the U.S. Coast Guard Base, Alameda, California until she was scrapped two years later.
