= USCGC Klamath =

Owasco class high endurance cutter

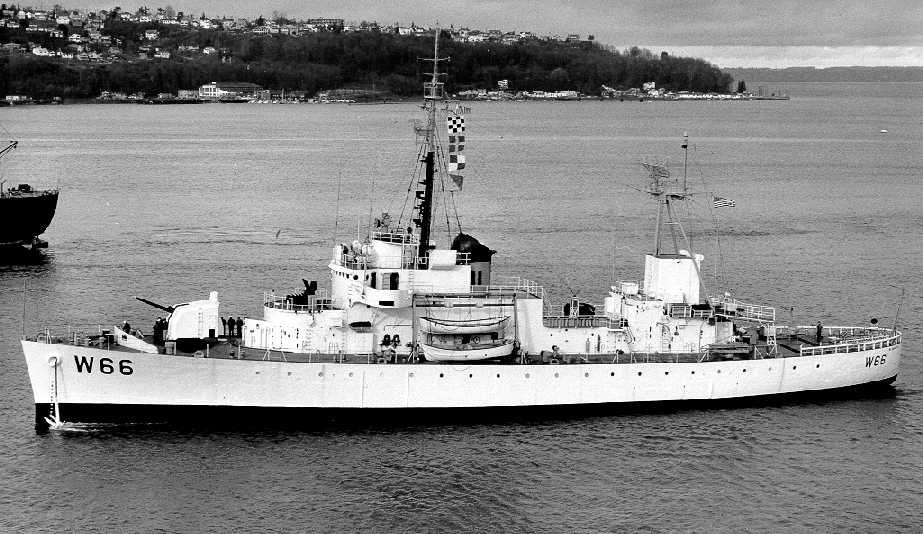
- USCGC Klamath (WHEC-66), 28 February 1966

History

United States
- Namesake: Klamath Lake, Oregon
- Builder: Western Pipe & Steel
- Yard number: WPS 153
- Laid down: December 1944
- Launched: 2 September 1945
- Christened: Klamath
- Commissioned: 5 September 1946
- Decommissioned: 1 May 1973
- Reclassified: WPG-66 to WHEC-66
- Fate: Sold for scrap, 18 November 1974
- Notes: WPS Hull No. 153.

General characteristics
- Type: Owasco-class cutter
- Displacement: 1,978 full (1966); 1,342 light (1966)
- Length: 254 ft (77.4 m) oa.; 245 ft (74.7 m) pp.
- Beam: 43 ft 1 in (13.1 m)
- Draft: 17 ft 3 in (5.3 m) (1966)
- Installed power: 4,000 shp (3,000 kW) (1945)
- Propulsion: 1 × Westinghouse electric motor driven by a turbine, (1945)
- Speed: 17 knots (31 km/h; 20 mph).
- Range: 6,157 mi (9,909 km) at 17 knots; 10,376 mi (16,699 km) at 10 knots (19 km/h; 12 mph) (1966)
- Complement: 10 officers, 3 warrants, 130 enlisted (1966)
- Sensors & processing systems: Detection Radar: SPS-23, SPS-29, Mk 26, Mk 27 (1966); Sonar: SQS-1 (1966)
- Armament: 1945: 2 × twin 5 in/38 cal. dual-purpose gun mounts; 2 × quad 40 mm AA gun mounts; 2 × depth charge tracks; 6 × "K" gun depth charge projectors; 1 × Hedgehog projector.; 1966: 1 × 5 in/38 cal. dual-purpose gun mount; 1 × Hedgehog projector
- Notes: Fuel capacity: 141,755 gal (Oil, 95%).

USCGC Klamath (WHEC-66) was an Owasco-class high endurance cutter built for World War II service with the United States Coast Guard. The war ended before the ship was completed and consequently Klamath did not see wartime service until the Vietnam War.

Klamath was built by Western Pipe & Steel at the company's San Pedro shipyard. Named after Klamath Lake, Oregon, she was commissioned as a patrol gunboat with ID number WPG-66 on 19 June 1946. Her ID was later changed to WHEC-66 (HEC for "High Endurance Cutter" - the "W" signifies a Coast Guard vessel).

== Peacetime service ==
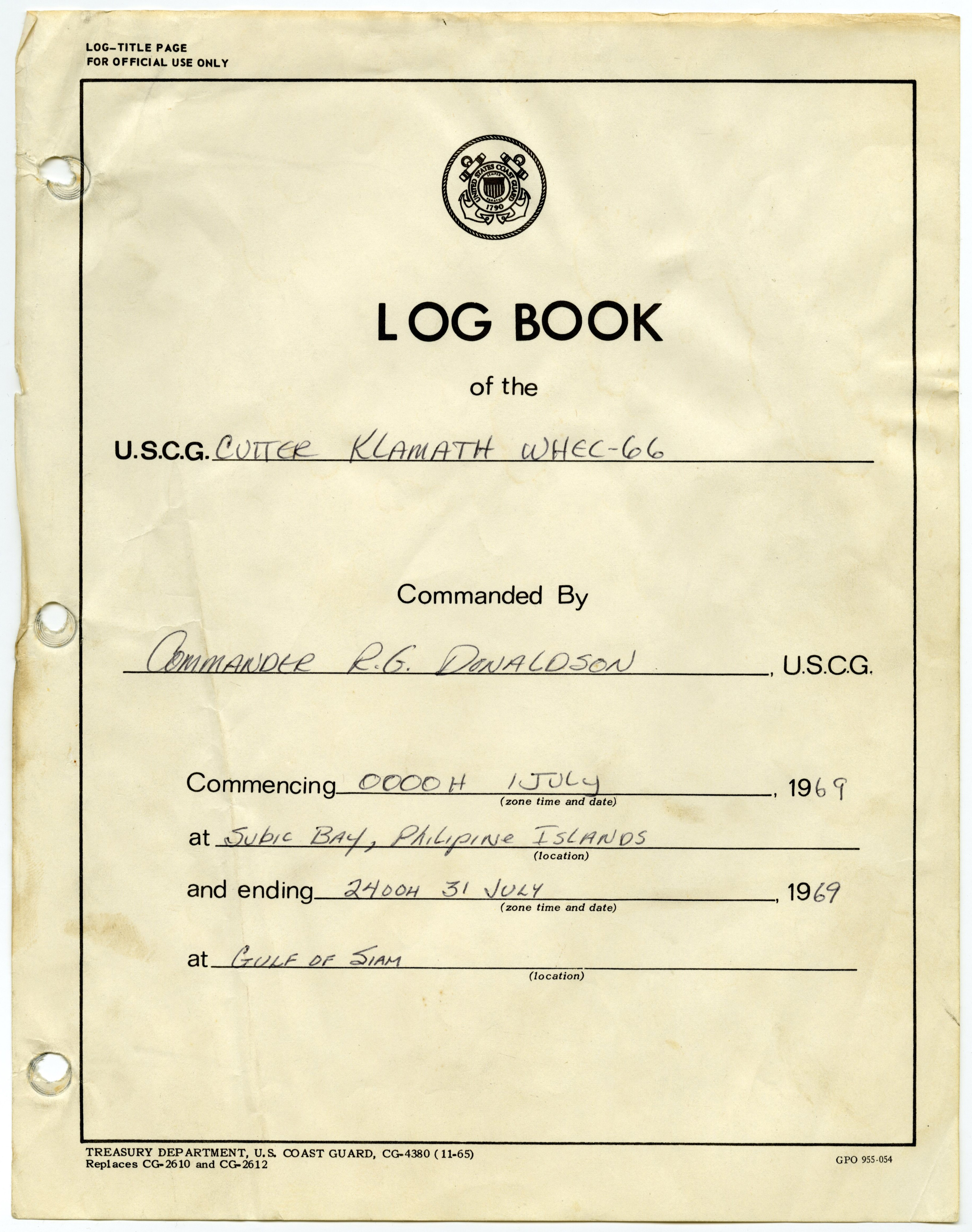
USCG Klamath Logbook Cover: July 1–31, 1969

Klamath was homeported at Seattle, Washington, from 19 June 1946 to 1 May 1973. She was used for law enforcement, ocean station, and search and rescue operations in the Pacific. Additionally, she also conducted Bering Sea Patrol annually.

From 20 to 24 March 1966, she inspected the Soviet MV Olyturka, which had sought haven in U.S. waters following a casualty. On 25 March 1966, the Japanese FV's Bansho Maru No. 38 and Tenyo Maru No. 3 were discovered in U.S. waters and escorted out.

January 1972, Klamath was dispatched from Alaskan patrol to render assistance to the Japanese
freighter Tenzan Maru, which was taking on water 800 miles west of Seattle. Klamath crew
boarded the Tenzan Maru and installed temporary repairs, then escorted the freighter to
San Francisco.

== Vietnam War ==
Klamath was assigned to Coast Guard Squadron Three, South Vietnam, from 14 May 1969 to 31 January 1970.

== Return to peacetime duties ==
In February 1972, a boarding party from Klamath helped save the badly damaged MV Tenzan Maru and she was subsequently escorted to safety.

== Decommissioning ==
Klamath was decommissioned on 1 May 1973 and was sold for scrap on 18 November 1974.
