= HMS Culver =

Sloop of the Royal Navy

Coordinates: 48°43′N 20°14′W

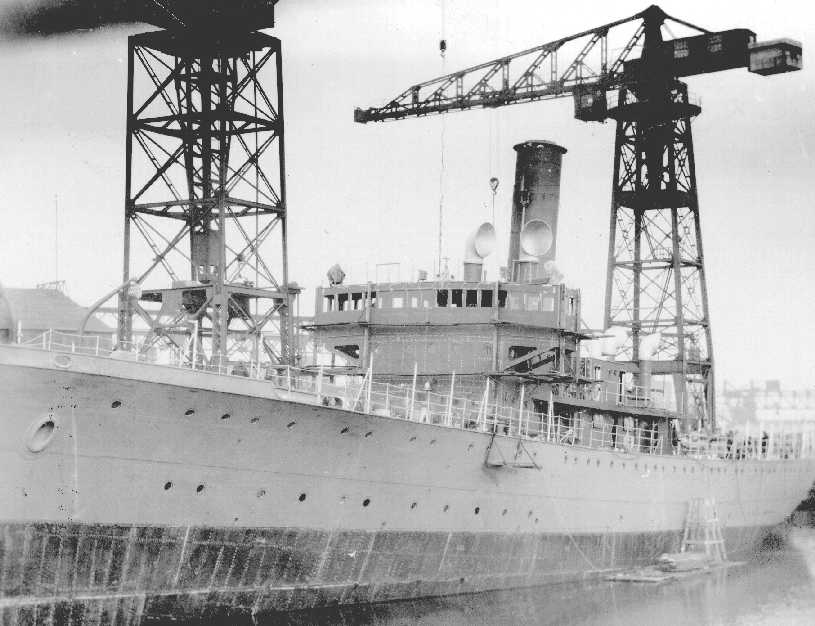
- USCGC Mendota, under construction, circa 1928.

History

United States
- Name: USCGC Mendota
- Namesake: Lake Mendota
- Builder: Bethlehem Shipbuilding Corporation
- Laid down: 20 June 1928
- Launched: 27 November 1928
- Commissioned: 23 March 1929
- Fate: Transferred to Royal Navy, 30 April 1941.

United Kingdom
- Name: HMS Culver
- Commissioned: 30 April 1941
- Identification: Pennant number: Y97
- Fate: Sunk 31 January 1942.

General characteristics
- Class & type: Lake-class cutter (USCG); Banff-class sloop (RN)
- Displacement: 2,075 long tons (2,108 t)
- Length: 250 ft (76.2 m)
- Beam: 42 ft (12.8 m)
- Draft: 12 ft 11 in (3.9 m)
- Propulsion: 1 × General Electric turbine-driven 3,350 shp (2,500 kW) electric motor, 2 boilers
- Speed: 14.8 knots (27.4 km/h; 17.0 mph) cruising; 17.5 knots (32.4 km/h; 20.1 mph) maximum
- Complement: 97
- Armament: 1 × 5"/51 caliber gun; 1 × 3"/50 caliber gun; 2 × 6-pounder (57 mm) gun

USCGC Mendota was a Lake-class cutter belonging to the United States Coast Guard launched on 20 June 1928 and commissioned on 23 March 1929. After 12 years of service with the Coast Guard, she was transferred to the British Royal Navy as part of the Lend-Lease Act and renamed HMS Culver. While escorting an SL convoy, on 31 January 1942 she was sunk when struck by two torpedoes fired by the German submarine U-105.

== Career ==
=== U.S. Coast Guard as Mendota ===
After commissioning in March 1929, Mendota was homeported in Norfolk, Virginia. In March 1932, Mendota came to the aid of the oil tanker Dixie Arrow after her steering gear had been damaged in a storm. On 22 December 1939, Sebago attempted to assist the 2,847 gross register tons (GRT) Greek steamship Aliakmon, which had grounded north of Wash Woods, Virginia. The 12-inch (30 cm) hawser that had been secured to the vessel parted, but Mendota, having arrived a few hours later, was able to float the $200,000 vessel.

=== Royal Navy as Culver ===
As part of the Lend-Lease Act she was transferred to the Royal Navy where she was renamed HMS Culver (Y87) and commissioned on 30 April 1941. On 31 October 1941, Culver picked up 25 people from the Dutch merchant vessel Bennekom which had been sunk by a torpedo from U-96.

==== Sinking ====
On 31 January 1942, while escorting convoy SL 98, Culver came under fire by the German submarine U-105. At 23:31 hours, she was struck twice, once on the port side in the forward boiler room and once in the aft, possibly near the magazine. She was broken in half an sank in under a minute; the incident killed the commander, 7 officers and 119 ratings. Surveiving crew, comprising one officer and 12 ratings, were rescued by HMS Londonderry.

== See also ==
- List of United States Coast Guard cutters
