= USCGC Mendota (WHEC-69) =

US Coast Guard vessel

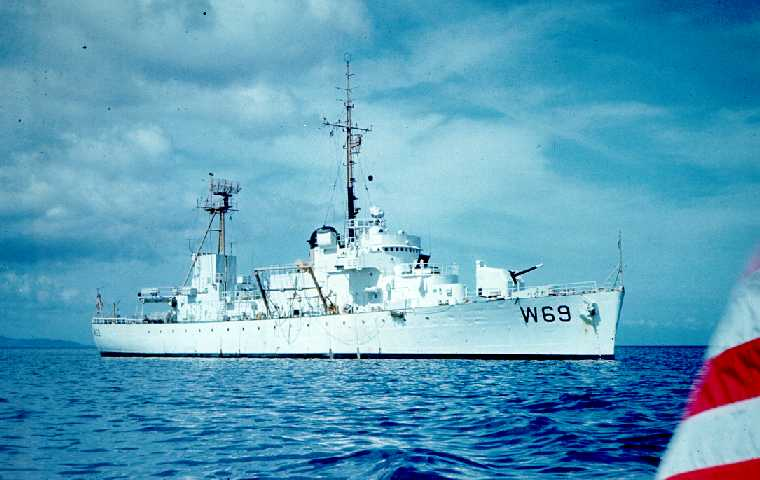
- USCGC Mendota (WHEC-69), in Montego Bay, Jamaica, 1966

History

United States
- Name: Mendota
- Namesake: Lake Mendota, Wisconsin
- Operator: United States Coast Guard
- Builder: Coast Guard Yard, Curtis Bay, Maryland
- Launched: 29 February 1944
- Commissioned: 2 June 1945
- Decommissioned: 1 November 1973
- Fate: Scrapped, 1974

General characteristics
- Class & type: Owasco-class cutter
- Displacement: 1,978 full (1966); 1,342 light (1966)
- Length: 254 ft (77.4 m) oa.; 245 ft (74.7 m) pp.
- Beam: 43 ft 1 in (13.1 m)
- Draft: 17 ft 3 in (5.3 m) (1966)
- Installed power: 4,000 shp (3,000 kW) (1945)
- Propulsion: 1 × Westinghouse electric motor driven by a turbine, (1945)
- Speed: 17 knots (31 km/h; 20 mph).
- Range: 6,157 mi (9,909 km) at 17 knots; 10,376 mi (16,699 km) at 10 knots (19 km/h; 12 mph) (1966)
- Complement: 10 officers, 3 warrants, 130 enlisted (1966)
- Sensors & processing systems: Detection Radar: SPS-23, SPS-29, Mk 26, Mk 27 (1966); Sonar: SQS-1 (1966)
- Armament: 1945: 2 × twin 5 in/38 cal. dual-purpose gun mounts; 2 × quad 40 mm AA gun mounts; 2 × depth charge tracks; 6 × "K" gun depth charge projectors; 1 × Hedgehog projector.; 1966: 1 × 5 in/38 cal. dual-purpose gun mount; 1 × Hedgehog projector
- Notes: Fuel capacity: 141,755 gal (Oil, 95%).

USCGC Mendota (WHEC-69) was an Owasco class high endurance cutter built for World War II service with the United States Coast Guard. The ship was commissioned three months before the end of the war and did not see combat action until the Vietnam War.

Mendota was built by the Coast Guard yard at Curtis Bay, Maryland, one of only two Owasco class vessels not to be built by Western Pipe & Steel. Named after Lake Mendota, Wisconsin, the ship was commissioned as a patrol gunboat with ID number WPG-69 on 2 June 1945. Her ID was later changed to WHEC-69 (HEC for "High Endurance Cutter" - the "W" signifies a Coast Guard vessel).

== Peacetime service ==
Mendota was stationed at Boston, Massachusetts, from April 1946 to January 1947. She was used for law enforcement, ocean station, and search and rescue operations. She was stationed at Wilmington, NC, from January 1947 to 29 February 1972 with the same duties assigned.

From 14 May to 23 July 1947, Mendota shared an International Ice Patrol with the cutter Spencer. Another International Ice Patrol was shared with the cutter Mocoma from 26 April to 3 July 1948. While serving on ocean station Charlie in early January 1949, Mendota had to leave early due to an acute case of appendicitis. From 28 to 31 March 1950, she towed the disabled MV Edison Mariner until a commercial tug arrived. On 21 and 22 August 1950, she towed the disabled MV South Bend Victory until relieved by a commercial tug. On 2 January 1952, she medevaced a crewman from FV Silver Bay at 44°47’N, 56°22’W. On 2 March 1952, she provided medical aid to MV Rachel Jackson at 37°30’N, 66°08’W. On 9 March 1952, she recovered a buoy and transferred it to the tender Madrona. On 12 and 13 March 1952, Mendota medevaced a crewman from MV Saxton Star and transferred him to MV Queen of Bermuda. On 18 September 1953, she medevaced a crewman from MV Government Camp.

From 15 to 17 March 1954, Mendota towed the disabled FV Eagle to Newfoundland. On 31 August 1954, she towed the disabled tug Ocean Prince until relieved. On 11 and 12 January 1955, she escorted the disabled MV Flying Cloud III to Frying Pan Shoals. On 13 January 1955, she assisted the disabled FV Stephen Margo 15 miles (24 km) northeast of Diamond Shoals. On 14 January 1955, she escorted an ammunition barge. On 15 and 16 August 1955, Mendota rescued 46 crew members and one dog from the Portuguese FV Ilhavense Segundo.

On 11 and 12 March 1957, Mendota assisted the disabled FV Stella Maris 63 miles (101 km) southwest of Louisbourg, Nova Scotia. On 25 January 1958, Mendota towed the disabled USN tug Sagamore and the destroyer escort Stewart to Southport, ME. On 22 May 1958, while serving on Ocean Station ECHO, she rescued the pilots from two USAF jets that had collided. On 6 January 1959, she assisted MV Hillcrest at 34°43’N, 62°30’W. From 1 to 22 August 1960, she was employed on the reserve cruise visiting Veracruz, Mexico. She paid an official visit to Curaçao from 18–21 August 1961.

On 15 November 1962, Mendota assisted the disabled schooner Curlew 90 miles (140 km) northwest of Bermuda. In March 1965, she served as on-scene commander following a mid-air collision of two USAF aircraft 200 miles (320 km) south of Cape Race, Newfoundland. The body of one of the pilots was recovered and returned to Argentia.

Mendota coordinated a search for the SV Stella Maris, a 26-foot (7.9 m) yacht with a single crew member sailing from Newport, Rhode Island, to Bermuda, in October 1966. The crewman refused assistance when found by Mendota, and Stella Maris later disappeared without a trace. Mendota participated in a medical emergency on board the SS Michelangelo in March, 1967 after Michelangelo was struck by a 110-foot (34 m) freak wave. On 24 April 1968, Mendota took on board 26 survivors from Irinis Luck. In the fall of 1968 Mendota coordinated the rescue of the Alberto Beneti during hurricane Helen.

== Vietnam war ==
After assignment to Coast Guard Squadron Three Mendota departed Wilmington on 27 January 1969, bound ultimately for the waters off the coast of Vietnam. Once in Vietnamese waters, Mendota conducted eight Operation Market Time patrols during which time she detected 1,550 vessels, inspected 825, and boarded 8. Mendota also participated in Special Operation SEALORD missions twice, Navy SEAL support missions three times and Operation Silver Mace once. Mendota acted as a troop transport, operational base, and rest stop for Cambodian and Chinese mercenaries and Hoi Chi troops on numerous occasions. The cutter steamed 29,288 miles (47,134 km) in the Western Pacific Ocean from March through October, 1969, and was underway 70-percent of that time.

Combat operations summary

Mendota also conducted naval gunfire support (NGS) missions during her tour. She participated in 31 NGS missions with her main battery, expending 2,527 rounds of ammunition. Additionally 731 rounds of 81 mm mortar were fired and 30,830 rounds of .50 caliber machine gun ammunition. Although many casualty results were not able to be confirmed, Army spotters and ground troops confirmed that Mendota's guns were responsible for 4 Viet Cong killed or wounded, while another 11 casualties were estimated. Mendota's guns also destroyed 20 structures, 6 bunkers, 3 sampans, and 9 bivouac areas, and damaged 27 structures and 10 bunkers.

Humanitarian missions

The crew of Mendota also participated in humanitarian missions while serving in Vietnam. These missions were concentrated on the village of Song Ông Đốc, on the Gulf of Thailand. The medical team conducted MEDCAPS (Medical Care of the Civilian Population), treating over 800 Vietnamese for every variety of medical malady during 14 visits to the village. The crew also helped rebuild a small dispensary. In addition, assistance was rendered to Vietnamese and Thai fishermen who were injured while fishing. U.S. and South Vietnamese forces were also treated by the medical personnel.

Logistics missions

Mendota was not only home to the 160 men who were permanently assigned as her crew. She also served as a "mother ship" to U.S. Navy "Swift" boats and their crews, and to a lesser degree the Coast Guard 82-foot patrol boats, which operated in the inner barrier closer to shore. Mendota serviced the 82-footers forty times during her stay while the "Swift" boats received logistic support daily, and the crews alternated being on board Mendota every other day. The medical staff also aided 51 men who had been wounded in action.

Hong Kong station ship

Mendota established an excellent record as Hong Kong station ship. For one month, from 6 May through 6 June 1969, CAPT C. S. Marple, USCG, the commanding officer of Mendota, was Senior Officer Present Afloat for Administration, or SOPA (ADMIN), Hong Kong, and the ship's personnel handled all administrative matters for U.S. naval vessels visiting Hong Kong. The crew also maintained a permanent Shore Party detachment to assist and supervise liberty visits ashore.

== Return to peacetime service ==
Mendota returned home to her homeport of Wilmington, NC, on 27 November 1969. During her mission to Vietnam and back Mendota steamed over 60,000 miles (97,000 km). She transited the Panama Canal in both directions, and visited Hawaii, Guam, Bangkok, Thailand, Kaohsiung, Formosa, and Subic Bay in the Republic of the Philippines.

== Decommissioning ==
Mendota was decommissioned on 1 November 1973. She was scrapped along with the others of the Owasco class in 1974.
