= USCGC Winnebago =

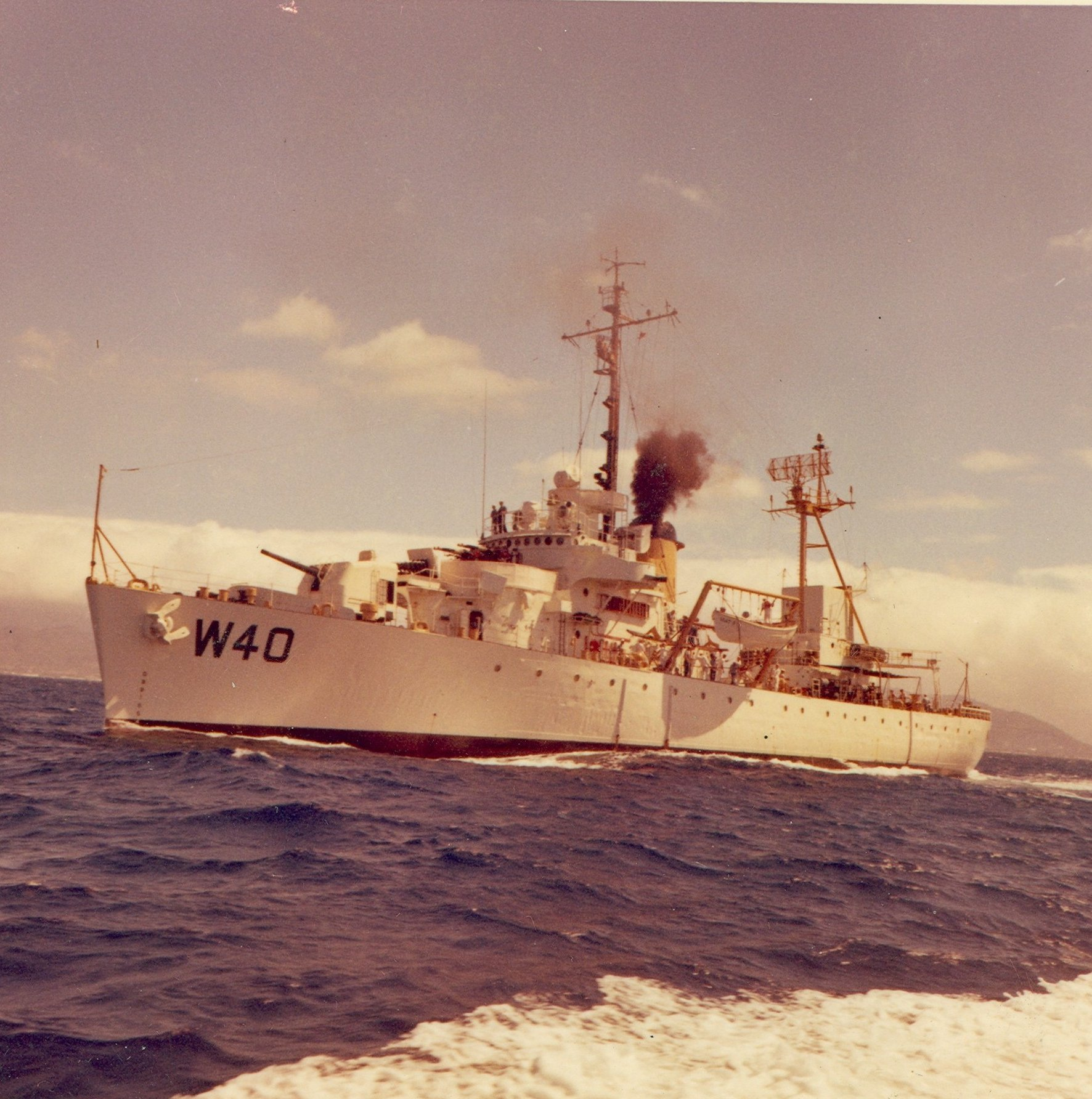
- USCGC Winnebago (WHEC-40)

History

United States
- Name: USCGC Winnebago
- Namesake: Lake Winnebago
- Owner: U.S. Coast Guard
- Builder: Western Pipe & Steel (WPS), Los Angeles, California
- Yard number: 146
- Launched: 2 July 1944
- Commissioned: 21 June 1945
- Decommissioned: 27 February 1973
- Identification: Hull numbers: WPG-40/WHEC-40; callsign: NRUB
- Nickname(s): "Winnnie", "Winnie Hoo Hoo", "4.O Winnie", "Wind Bag"
- Fate: Sold for scrap, 7 October 1974

General characteristics
- Type: Owasco-class cutter
- Displacement: 1,978 full (1966); 1,342 light (1966)
- Length: 254 ft (77.4 m) oa.; 245 ft (74.7 m) pp.
- Beam: 43 ft 1 in (13.1 m)
- Draft: 17 ft 3 in (5.3 m) (1966)
- Installed power: 4,000 shp (3,000 kW) (1945)
- Propulsion: 1 × Westinghouse electric motor driven by a turbine, (1945)
- Speed: 17 knots (31 km/h; 20 mph).
- Range: 6,157 mi (9,909 km) at 17 knots; 10,376 mi (16,699 km) at 10 knots (19 km/h; 12 mph) (1966)
- Complement: 10 officers, 3 warrants, 130 enlisted (1966)
- Sensors & processing systems: Detection Radar: SPS-23, SPS-29, Mk 26, Mk 27 (1966); Sonar: SQS-1 (1966)
- Armament: 1945: 2 × twin 5 in/38 cal. dual-purpose gun mounts; 2 × quad 40 mm AA gun mounts; 2 × depth charge tracks; 6 × "K" gun depth charge projectors; 1 × Hedgehog projector.; 1966: 1 × 5 in/38 cal. dual-purpose gun mount; 1 × Hedgehog projector
- Notes: Fuel capacity: 141,755 gal (Oil, 95%).

USCG Winnebago (WHEC-40) was an Owasco-class high endurance cutter which served with the United States Coast Guard from 1945 to 1973. Originally intended for World War II service, she was commissioned only weeks before the end of the war and consequently did not see combat until her deployment in the Vietnam War more than 20 years later.

Winnebago was built by Western Pipe & Steel (WPS) at the company's San Pedro shipyard. Named after Lake Winnebago, Wisconsin, she was commissioned as a patrol gunboat with ID number WPG-40 on 21 June 1945. In the postwar period, her ID was changed to WHEC-40 (HEC for "High Endurance Cutter" - the "W" signifies a Coast Guard cutter).

== Peacetime service ==
Winnebago was home ported in Miami, Florida, from 1945 to April 1946 and used for law enforcement, ocean station, and search and rescue operations. From April 1946 to February 1948 she was performing similar duties from her new base at Boston, Massachusetts. She was subsequently laid up at the Coast Guard Yard, Curtis Bay, Maryland, until September 1948. She was then stationed at U.S. Coast Guard Base Sand Island, Honolulu, Territory of Hawaii, later, the State of Hawaii from November 1949 to March 1972. In celebration of Hawaii statehood day, Winnebago in full dress, was open to the public. The ship's company paraded in downtown Honolulu for the celebration. She was again used for law enforcement, ocean station, and search and rescue operations. While on ocean station duty, the cutter's crew took hourly weather observations, provided communications, air navigation and meteorological information to commercial and military aircraft and merchant ships. She stood ready to respond to any requests for assistance from aircraft or ships in distress. Ocean Station Victor, her primary station, was located about half-way between Midway Island and Japan and covered 210 square miles (540 km^{2}). Typically Ocean Station patrols lasted 72 days. Four cutters alternated duty on the station. It took seven days to reach the station from Honolulu. After a 21-day patrol the cutter was relieved and then steamed to Yokosuka, Japan, for two weeks of rest and replenishment. She then returned to the ocean station for another 21-day patrol before returning to Honolulu.

On 26 March 1962 while making the entrance to Pearl Harbor Winnebago ran aground and became stranded on Tripod Reef. The cutter was extricated within a few days by Navy tugboats.

In November 1963, while serving on Ocean Station Victor, Winnebago steamed to the assistance of the disabled MV Green Mountain State. The cutter rendezvoused with the flooding merchantman and removed her crew. Winnebago's crew managed to stop the flooding and got the merchantman under tow. The cutter then towed the merchantman 810 miles (1,300 km) to Midway Island. For this rescue the crew was awarded the Coast Guard Unit Commendation. On 26 December 1964 the British MV Southbank was tossed by a 40-foot (12 m) wave onto a reef 400 yards (370 m) off Washington Island in the South Pacific. On board were two women, 57 crewmen, and 49 Gilbertese laborers bound for Fanning Island, 60 miles (97 km) distant. Using lifeboats the shipwrecked crew and passengers escaped safely to the beach where the Washington Island natives cared for them until they were rescued by Winnebago.

On 27 May 1965, Winnebago medevaced a disabled seaman from the Japanese FV Tsuru Maru No. 8 650 miles (1,050 km) south of Honolulu. In May 1966, her medical officer, a U.S. Public Health Service officer, performed an appendectomy on a Winnebago crewmen. Winnebago then rendezvoused with USS Navasota where Winnebago's medical officer performed another appendectomy on a Navasota crewman. Later in the same month, Winnebago rendezvoused with the Japanese MV Shoei Maru where the doctor amputated the foot of a 17-year-old seaman. In May 1967, she medevaced an injured crewman from Shoeu Maru and transferred him to Texas Maru.

== Vietnam War ==
Winnebago was assigned to Coast Guard Squadron Three, South Vietnam, from 20 September 1968 to 19 July 1969 as part of Operation Market Time. Her commanding officer during the deployment was CDR Bruce W. Dewing.

While serving in Vietnamese waters, Winnebago's gun crews destroyed or damaged 42 enemy bunkers, two observation towers, and a large base and several staging areas. In addition, her gunners hit an enemy "infiltration trail and a complex of enemy tunneling that connected underground storage facilities", that also caused heavy secondary explosions and fires. The cutter "investigated more than 1,500 vessels for infiltrators and enemy arms shipments". Her medical staff also treated over 50 South Vietnamese "for a variety of ailments". She participated in four search-and-rescue operations as well, including rescuing "eight Vietnamese, 17 Greeks, and 35 Filipinos" who were rescued from their "sinking ships" during the cutter's deployment.

== Return to peacetime operations ==
On 25 February 1970, Winnebago transferred a medical team to assist MV Sylvia Lykes near Midway Island. Eventually, Winnebago was stationed at Wilmington, North Carolina, from March 1972 to 27 February 1973 and used for law enforcement, ocean station, and search and rescue. She visited Curaçao from 6 to 8 March 1972 "for the purpose of goodwill and rest and recreation" while she was shifting her home ports.

== Decommissioning ==
Winnebago was decommissioned on 27 February 1973 and sold for scrap the following year.
