= USCGC Pontchartrain (WHEC-70) =

US Coast Guard vessel

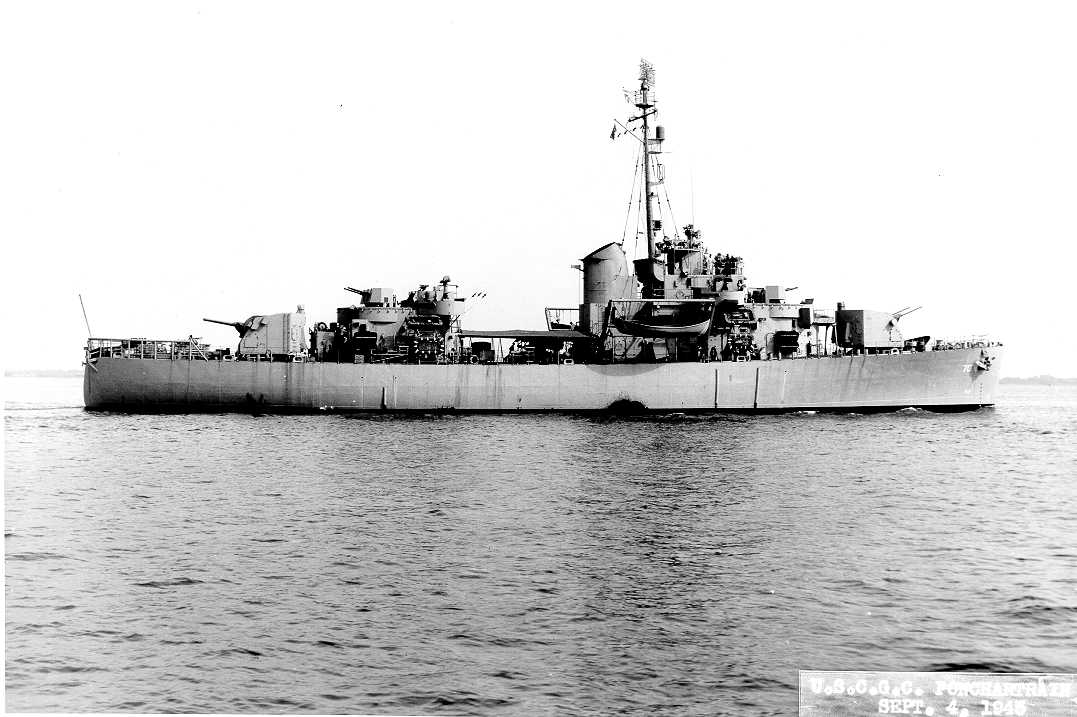
- USCGC Pontchartrain (WHEC-70), 1 September 1945. Her World War II armament of two twin dual-purpose 5"/38-caliber gun turrets is clearly visible here

History

United States
- Name: Pontchartrain
- Namesake: Lake Pontchartrain, Louisiana
- Operator: United States Coast Guard
- Builder: Coast Guard Yard, Curtis Bay, Maryland
- Launched: 29 February 1944
- Christened: Okeechobee
- Commissioned: 28 July 1945
- Decommissioned: 19 October 1973
- Reclassified: WPG-70 to WHEC-70
- Fate: Scrapped, 1974

General characteristics
- Type: Owasco-class cutter
- Displacement: 1,978 full (1966); 1,342 light (1966)
- Length: 254 ft (77.4 m) oa.; 245 ft (74.7 m) pp.
- Beam: 43 ft 1 in (13.1 m)
- Draft: 17 ft 3 in (5.3 m) (1966)
- Installed power: 4,000 shp (3,000 kW) (1945)
- Propulsion: 1 × Westinghouse electric motor driven by a turbine, (1945)
- Speed: 17 knots (31 km/h; 20 mph).
- Range: 6,157 mi (9,909 km) at 17 knots; 10,376 mi (16,699 km) at 10 knots (19 km/h; 12 mph) (1966)
- Complement: 10 officers, 3 warrants, 130 enlisted (1966)
- Sensors & processing systems: Detection Radar: SPS-23, SPS-29, Mk 26, Mk 27 (1966); Sonar: SQS-1 (1966)
- Armament: 1945: 2 × twin 5 in/38 cal. dual-purpose gun mounts; 2 × quad 40 mm AA gun mounts; 2 × depth charge tracks; 6 × "K" gun depth charge projectors; 1 × Hedgehog projector.; 1966: 1 × 5 in/38 cal. dual-purpose gun mount; 1 × Hedgehog projector
- Notes: Fuel capacity: 141,755 gal (Oil, 95%).

USCGC Pontchartrain (WHEC-70) was an Owasco class high endurance cutter built for World War II service with the United States Coast Guard. The ship was commissioned just days before the end of the war and thus did not see combat action until the Korean War.

Pontchartrain was built by the Coast Guard yard at Curtis Bay, Maryland, one of only two Owasco class vessels not to be built by Western Pipe & Steel. Named after Lake Pontchartrain, Louisiana, the ship was commissioned as a patrol gunboat with ID number WPG-70 on 28 July 1945. Her ID was later changed to WHEC-70 (HEC for "High Endurance Cutter"—the "W" signifies a Coast Guard vessel).

== Peacetime Service ==
Pontchartrain was originally named Okeechobee. She was stationed at Boston, Massachusetts, from 1 April 1946 to 17 October 1947 [there is conflicting data that indicates station at Boston until 23 August 1948] and was used for law enforcement, ocean station, and search and rescue operations. She was subsequently decommissioned and stored at the Coast Guard Yard, Curtis Bay, MD, until 5 September 1948. She was re-commissioned and homeported at Norfolk, Virginia, until 12 November 1949. From 12 November 1949 to sometime in 1972 she was stationed at Long Beach, California. During her last 18 months, until decommissioning 19 October 1973, she was home-ported in Wilmington, NC. She was used for law enforcement, ocean station, and search and rescue operations in the Pacific and Atlantic.

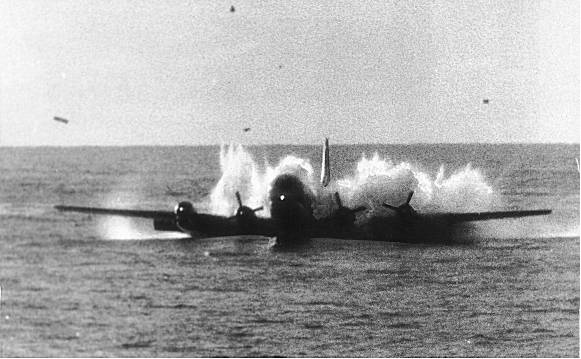
Pan Am Flight 6 ditching, photographed from Pontchartrain

On 4 May 1950, Pontchartrain assisted the disabled FV Eta near Catalina Island. On 20 August 1955, she escorted the disabled American MV John C. On 26 and 27 August 1955, she assisted the disabled FV Nina Ann. On 16 October 1956, she rescued all on Pan American Clipper 6, which ditched only 1/2 mile from the cutter's position at Ocean Station N. On 20 November 1956, Pontchartrain assisted LSM-455 aground on San Clemente Island. On 26 August 1957, she assisted the disabled FV Modeoday 2 miles north of North Point Pinos. On 22 November 1957, she assisted the disabled yacht Gosling at 33°59’N, 120°16’W.

On 25 February 1958, Pontchartrain assisted the disabled yacht Intrepid. From 11 to 21 August 1958, she served on a reserve training cruise. She patrolled the Ensenada Bay Race on 10 May 1959. On 10 July 1959, she assisted FV Carolyn Dee at 33°N, 120°W. On 13 and 14 July 1959, she assisted MV Mamie. On 17 August 1960, she patrolled the Acapulco Yacht Race. From 20 August to 3 September 1960, she served on a reserve training cruise. On 19 October 1959, she rescued three from the ketch Alpha at 30°21’N, 117°56’W. On 22 January 1961, she medevaced a patient from USNS Richfield. On 30 April 1963, Pontchartrain assisted the disabled FV Gaga 10 miles east of San Nicolas Island.

== Vietnam War ==
Pontchartrain was assigned to Coast Guard Squadron Three, South Vietnam, from 31 March to 9 November 1970.

== Decommissioning ==
Pontchartrain was decommissioned on 19 October 1973. She was scrapped with the rest of the Owasco class in 1974.
