= Owasco-class cutter =

American Coast Guard vessel

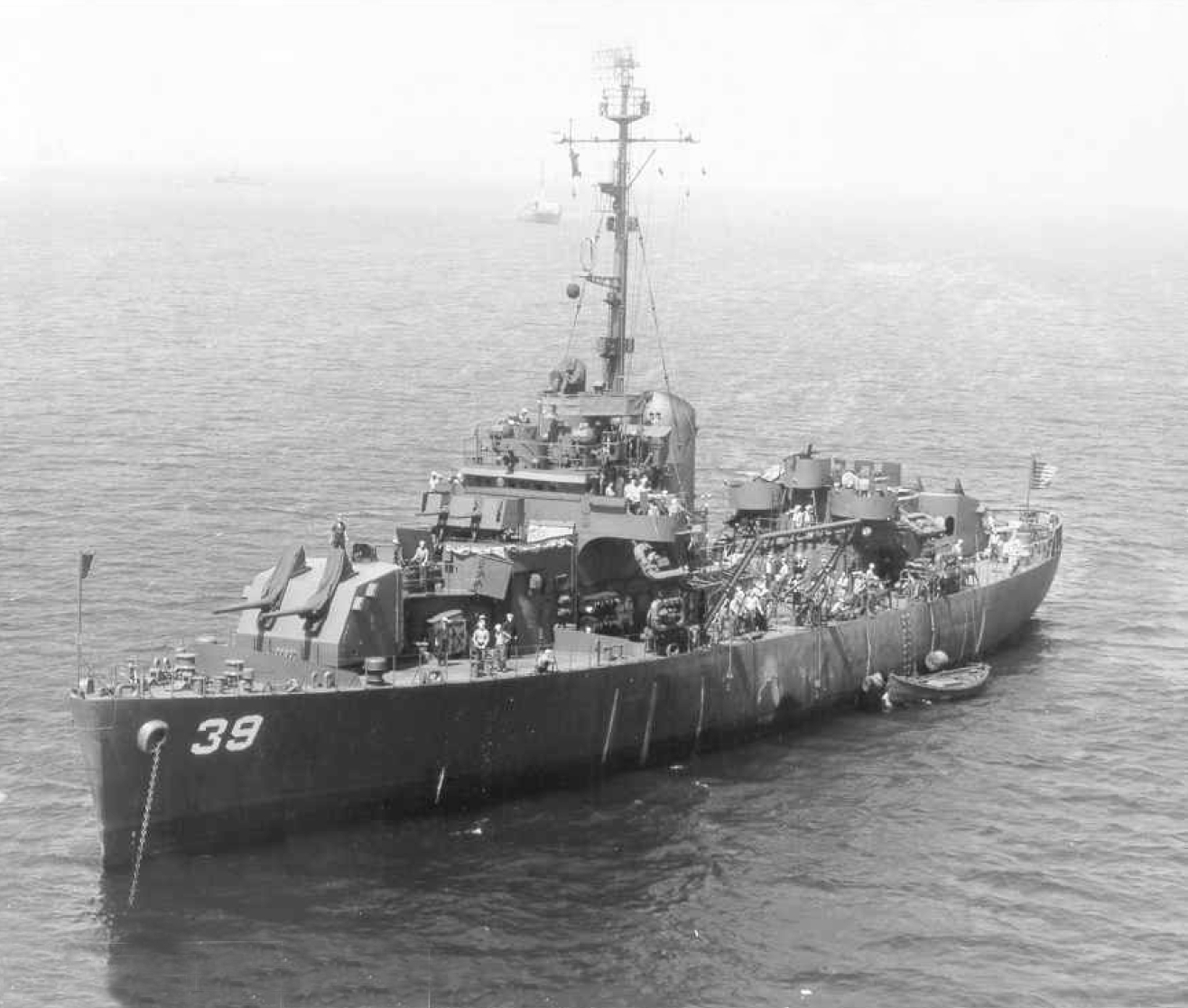
- USCGC Owasco (WPG-39), 1945. Her World War II armament of twin 5"/38 cal gun turrets is apparent here.

Class overview
- Name: Owasco class
- Builders: Western Pipe & Steel; US Coast Guard Yard
- Operators: United States Coast Guard
- Preceded by: Wind class
- Succeeded by: Hamilton class
- Built: 1944–1946
- In commission: 1945–1974
- Completed: 13
- Scrapped: 13

General characteristics
- Type: Cutter
- Displacement: 1,978 full (1966); 1,342 light (1966)
- Length: 254 ft (77.4 m) oa.; 245 ft (74.7 m) pp.
- Beam: 43 ft 1 in (13.1 m)
- Draft: 17 ft 3 in (5.3 m) (1966)
- Installed power: 4,000 shp (3,000 kW) (1945)
- Propulsion: 1 × Westinghouse electric motor driven by a turbine, (1945)
- Speed: 17 knots (31 km/h; 20 mph).
- Range: 6,157 mi (9,909 km) at 17 knots; 10,376 mi (16,699 km) at 10 knots (19 km/h; 12 mph) (1966)
- Complement: 10 officers, 3 warrants, 130 enlisted (1966)
- Sensors & processing systems: Detection Radar: SPS-23, SPS-29, Mk 26, Mk 27 (1966); Sonar: SQS-1 (1966)
- Armament: 1945: 2 × twin 5 in/38 cal. dual-purpose gun mounts; 2 × quad 40 mm AA gun mounts; 4 x 1 Oerlikon 20mm mounts; 2 × depth charge tracks; 6 × "K" gun depth charge projectors; 1 × Hedgehog projector.; 1966: 1 × 5 in/38 cal. dual-purpose gun mount; 1 × Hedgehog projector
- Notes: Fuel capacity: 141,755 gal (Oil, 95%).

The Owasco-class cutter was a 255-foot (78 m) cutter class operated by the United States Coast Guard. A total of thirteen cutters in the class were built, all named after lakes. Eleven were constructed by the Western Pipe & Steel Company at San Pedro, California, while the remaining two—Mendota and Pontchartrain—were constructed by the Coast Guard Yard at Curtis Bay, Maryland. Initially heavily armed for World War II service and designated patrol gunboats (WPG) under the United States Navy designation system, the vessels were stripped of much of their armament shortly after the war, and in 1965 were redesignated high endurance cutters (WHEC) after the Coast Guard adopted its own designation system.

== Design ==
=== Rationale ===
Myths have long shadowed the design history of the 255-foot (78 m) class. These cutters were to have been much larger ships, and two theories persist as to why they were shortened. The first is that they were built to replace the ships supplied to Great Britain under lend-lease, and Congress stipulated that the Coast Guard had to build these replacement cutters to the same size and character as those provided to the British. The second is that their length was determined by the maximum length that could pass through the locks of the Welland Canal from the Great Lakes to the St. Lawrence River. The Great Lakes shipbuilding industry brought pressure on Congress to ensure that it had the potential to bid on the contract. The first theory seems to be correct, but the second cannot be ruled out.

The Coast Guard had prepared a design for a 316-foot (96 m) cutter that was to have been an austere 327. This design was cut down into the 255-foot (78 m) ship. To accomplish this, everything was squeezed down and automated to a degree not before achieved in a turbo-electric-driven ship.

=== Machinery ===
The machinery design of the 255s was compact and innovative, but overly complex. It had pilothouse control, variable-rate (10 to 1) burners, and automatic synchronizing between the turbogenerator and the motor. Westinghouse engineers developed a system of synchronization and a variable-frequency drive for main-propulsion auxiliary equipment, which kept the pumps and other items at about two-thirds the power required for constant-frequency operation. The combined boiler room/engine room was a break with tradition.

The turbo-alternators for ship-service power exhausted at 20 psi gauge pressure instead of into a condenser. This steam was used all over the ship before finally going to a condenser. Space heating, galley, cooking, laundry, freshwater evaporation, fuel, and feed-water heating were all taken from the 20 psi back-pressure line.

=== Icegoing design features ===
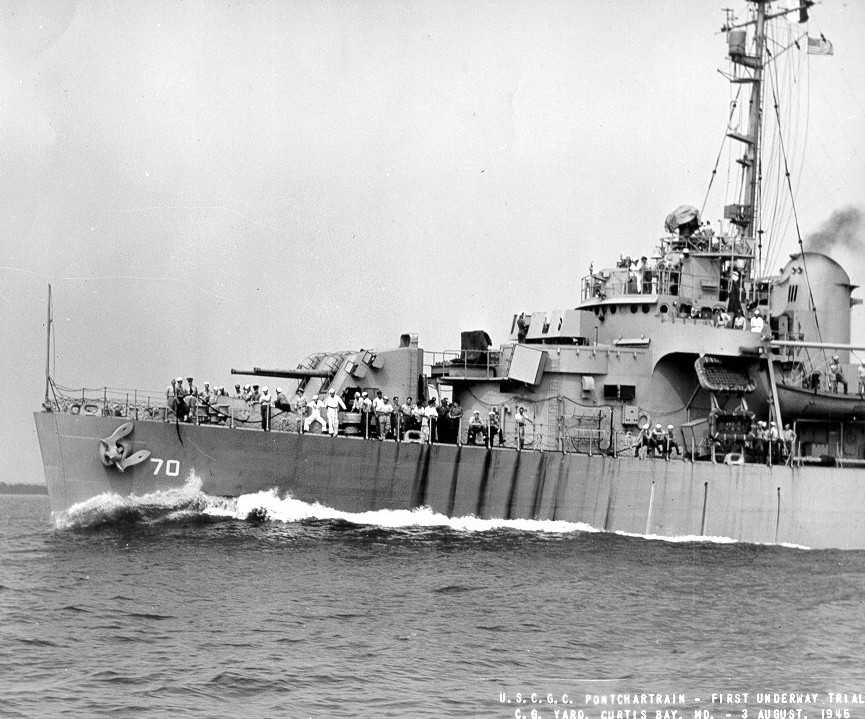
USCGC Pontchartrain (WPG-70).

The 255-foot (78 m) class was an ice-going design. Ice operations had been assigned to the Coast Guard early in the war, and almost all new construction was either ice-going or ice-breaking.

The hull was designed with constant flare at the waterline for ice-going. The structure was longitudinally framed with heavy web frames and an ice belt of heavy plating, and it had extra transverse framing above and below the design waterline. An enormous amount of weight was saved utilizing the technique of electric welding. The 250-foot (76 m) cutters' weights were used for estimating purposes. Tapered bulkhead stiffeners cut from 12" I-beams went from the main deck (4' depth of web) to the bottom (8" depth of web). As weight was cut out of the hull structure, electronics and ordnance were increased, but at much greater heights. This top weight required ballasting the fuel tanks with seawater to maintain stability both for wind and damaged conditions.

The superstructure of the 255s was originally divided into two islands in order to accommodate an aircraft amidships, but this requirement was dropped before any of the units became operational. Following completion of the preliminary design by the Coast Guard, the work was assigned to George G. Sharp of New York to prepare the contract design.

== Number ==
The number of ships in the class – thirteen in total – had an interesting origin. Three were to have been replacements for over-aged cutters, the Ossipee, Tallapoosa and Unalaga, and ten units were to be replacements for the 250-foot (76 m) class transferred to Great Britain under lend-lease. For economy, all thirteen units were built to the same design.

== Service ==
The class was initially heavily armed with World War II service in mind, but much of this armament was deemed unnecessary for peacetime and was removed in the postwar period. (Note: The USCG's article on Owasco, for example, states: "Initially fitted out as a gunboat, in 1946 she was converted to peacetime status, including the removal of much of her armament ... The work was completed in May, 1946." See also the specs in the same article. Basically, the ships had their two twin 5"/38 cal gun turrets, one fore and one aft, removed, and replaced with a single 5"/38 cal gun in the bow. The two twin 40 mm antiaircraft turrets were also removed, along with most of the antisubmarine weapons.) Construction of the class received a low priority, and consequently none of the cutters were commissioned in time to see action in WWII, but a number eventually saw combat in the Vietnam War. They were all however to provide many years of peacetime service in regular Coast Guard roles such as law enforcement, ocean station, and search and rescue operations.

Iroquois suffered major damage in a maritime incident in the 1950s and was cannibalized for parts for the other cutters before being scrapped in 1965. The remainder of the class was scrapped in 1974.

== Ships in Class ==
Ship Name	Hull ID	Commission	Fate
Owasco	WHEC-39	1945-1973	Scrapped, 7 October 1974
Winnebago	WHEC-40	1945-1973	Scrapped, 7 October 1974
Chautauqua	WHEC-41	1945-1973	Scrapped, 1974
Sebago	WHEC-42	1945-1972	Scrapped, 1974
Iroquois	WHEC-43	1946-1965	Scrapped, 1 June 1965
Wachusett	WHEC-44	1946-1973	Scrapped, 18 November 1974
Escanaba	WHEC-64	1946-1974	Scrapped, 1974
Winona	WHEC-65	1946-1974	Scrapped, 1974
Klamath	WHEC-66	1946-1973	Scrapped, 18 November 1974
Minnetonka	WHEC-67	1946-1974	Scrapped, 1974
Androscoggin	WHEC-68	1946-1973	Scrapped, 7 October 1974
Mendota	WHEC-69	1945-1973	Scrapped, 1974
Pontchartrain	WHEC-70	1945-1973	Scrapped, 1974
