= USCGC Androscoggin =

USCGC Androscoggin is the name of the following ships of the United States Coast Guard:

- USCGC Androscoggin, previously USRC Androscoggin
- USCGC Androscoggin (WHEC-68)

== See also ==
- Androscoggin (disambiguation)
- USS Androscoggin
