= Action of 1 March 1968 =

Military engagement during the Vietnam War

- Part of the Vietnam War
- Trawler locations on 1 March 1968
Date	1 March 1968
Location	South Vietnam
Result	United States/South Vietnamese victory

Belligerents
South Vietnam; United States	North Vietnam

Commanders and leaders
William H. Stewart	Unknown

Strength
Sea: 1 minesweeper 4 cutters 7 swift boats 2 junks 1 patrol boat Air: 3 aircraft	4 naval trawlers

Casualties and losses
None; 4 cutters damaged	~14 killed 2 naval trawlers sunk 1 naval trawler scuttled

The action of 1 March 1968 was a co-ordinated attempt by four North Vietnamese trawlers to resupply the Viet Cong and the efforts of Operation Market Time elements to stop them during the Vietnam War. On 28 February 1968, United States Navy SP-2H Neptune aircraft on routine patrol detected a North Vietnamese SL class naval trawler heading towards the South Vietnamese coast from north of the DMZ. By the next morning, three more trawlers were discovered and units of Operation Market Time were deployed for a surprise interception. The suspect trawlers did not fly flags so it was not until the start of the engagement that their origin was discovered. The trawlers were steel-hulled vessels, 100 feet long and armed with 57-millimeter recoilless rifles and machine guns. All four vessels were loaded with weapons and ammunition intended to be delivered to the Viet Cong. American and South Vietnamese forces that engaged in action included the United States Coast Guard cutters Androscoggin, Point Grey, Point Welcome, Winona, Point Grace, Point Hudson, Point Marone, the swift boats USS PCF-18, USS PCF-20, USS PCF-42, USS PCF-43, USS PCF-46, USS PCF-47 and USS PCF-48, two South Vietnamese navy junks and one patrol boat. Two U.S. Army helicopter gunships also participated in combat as well as aircraft used to fire flares.

== Background ==
The United States Navy, South Vietnamese navy, and the U.S. Coast Guard, operating under the authority of the South Vietnamese government, established a blockade of South Vietnam designated Operation Market Time to prevent infiltrations of personnel, munitions and equipment by the North Vietnamese government. A twelve mile wide restricted zone existed along the entire South Vietnamese coast and ships assigned to Market Time had the authority to stop and search any vessel within the zone for contraband material and check the identity papers of any person on a detained vessel.

== Action ==
=== Action off Bo De River ===
The trawler designated in U.S. Navy records as An Xuyen Province Trawler (map reference #1) was first sighted on 28 February approximately 150 miles east southeast of Vũng Tàu holding a southeasterly course. On the evening of the 29th she changed to a westerly course and USCGC Winona started a covert surveillance. The trawler crossed the 12-mile limit at 0120 1 March and began a run for the beach near the mouth of the Bo De River at 0200. A blocking force placed near the mouth of the river consisted of several Navy PCF's and the Coast Guard cutters Point Hudson, Point Grace, and Point Marone. Winona fired warning shots eight miles off the coast which were ignored so she opened up with her 5-inch/38 caliber gun after receiving return fire from the trawler. The trawler exploded in a huge fireball after taking several direct hits and sank approximately seven miles off the beach. Winona was struck by several pieces of debris from the explosion, however only minor injuries were sustained by the crew during the action.

=== Action off Nha Trang ===
The trawler designated Khánh Hòa Province Trawler (map reference #2) was first sighted by Market Time aircraft on 29 February approximately 90 miles east northeast of Nha Trang with a southwesterly course. Surveillance was continued by Market Time vessels until she crossed the 12-mile limit 28 miles northeast of Nha Trang. Ignoring warning to heave to for boarding, the trawler continued on towards the beach. A South Vietnamese Navy patrol boat opened fire on the trawler and it quickly changed course and returned fire. Assisted by a U.S. Air Force AC-47 gunship, swift boats PCF-42, PCF-43, PCF-46, PCF-47, PCF-48 and two SVN junks sortied to help the patrol craft chase the trawler to a cove where it ran aground in the Hon Heo Secret Zone At 0230, 1 March, five 81-millimeter mortar rounds from PCF-47 were direct hits and the trawler exploded with a massive explosion due to the munitions aboard. Fourteen dead North Vietnamese sailors were recovered the following morning. Rifles, machine guns and rocket launchers; along with considerable ammunition and explosives were recovered from the sunken trawler. The salvage operations extended over 12 days and included the recovery of a 14.5 millimeter antiaircraft gun and 68 cases of ammunition.

=== Action off Tha Cau River ===
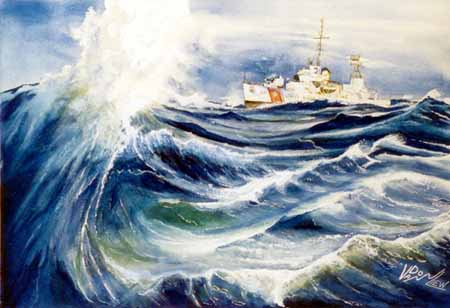
USCGC Androscoggin painting "Weather decks secure" by Don Van Liew

Forty miles from Chu Lai and six miles off the coast, (map reference #3) USCGC Androscoggin intercepted a third trawler designated in U.S. Navy records as the Quảng Ngãi Province Trawler. Androscoggin signaled the trawler to identify itself at 0112 but there was no response so Androscoggin shot 5-inch star shells into the air to illuminate the trawler. It was then that the trawler was positively identified as an SL class North Vietnamese trawler so the Androscoggin opened fire at 0120 with 5-inch high explosive naval gunfire and .50 caliber machine guns. The trawler returned fire with a recoilless rifle, laid a smoke screen and turned into Androscoggin's direction but one of the cutter's shells hit the after starboard side, so the trawler turned reversed course and headed for the shore. As a result of a civilian junk passing through the battle area the Market Time ships had to cease fire. Two United States Army helicopters were directed to engage the trawler with rockets and miniguns at 0129 and after their attack a reduction in the amount of fire coming from the trawler was noticed. At 0140 Point Grey, Point Welcome, PCF-18 and PCF-20 were ordered to take the trawler under fire with mortars and machine guns at close range because the trawler had moved too close to shore for Androscoggin to maneuver. Point Welcome struck the trawler twice with 81-millimeter rounds. The trawler then grounded 50 yards off the mouth of the Tha Cau River at 0210. At 0220, the North Vietnamese tried to scuttle their ship and failed but a second attempt at 0235 succeeded in destroying the vessel in a 500-foot fireball. The explosion caused some damage to the pilothouse of Point Welcome and the deck was littered with debris but no casualties were reported.

== Other action on 1 March ==
USCGC Minnetonka shadowed the trawler designated as the Bình Định Province Trawler (map reference #4) but soon after being detected, the trawler turned around and headed back out to sea without being engaged. It was apparently headed for the Lo Dien area 42 miles north of Qui Nhơn. The trawler never got any closer to the coast than 30 miles and after she reversed course was monitored by aircraft until she approached the coast of the People's Republic of China.

While on Market Time patrol duties on 1 March, USS Persistent discovered an abandoned junk at anchor 52 miles southeast of Da Nang. After a search of the area failed to locate persons in the water, the junk was boarded and items were found of a Communist Chinese origin including a Communist Chinese flag. The junk was hoisted on board Persistent and delivered to Da Nang for further inspection.

== Aftermath ==
The destruction of three of the four trawlers and the turning back of the fourth demonstrated that Operation Market Time was an effective net for the interception of supplies destined for resupply of the Viet Cong. Except for the 1 March trawlers and one other instance in the days after Tet 1968 no other trawlers were spotted between July 1967 and August 1969. The North Vietnamese were forced to use the Ho Chi Minh trail through Laos or the neutral port of Sihanoukville in Cambodia to ship supplies to the Viet Cong. With the closing of the port at Sihanoukville to Communist shipping in August 1969, attempted North Vietnamese trawler traffic into South Vietnam resumed. (Note: Cambodian Prince Norodom Sihanouk halted arms shipments through Cambodia in August 1969, effectively closing the port city of Sihanoukville to Communist shipping.) Of 15 trawlers detected by Market Time assets from August 1969 to late 1970, one was sunk, 13 were turned back and only one got through. In 1970, ten out of eleven trawlers were either sunk or were turned back.

== Notes ==
=== References cited ===
- Cutler, Thomas J. (2000). Brown Water, Black Berets: Coastal and Riverine Warfare in Vietnam. Naval Institute Press, Annapolis. ISBN 978-1-55750-196-7.
- Johnson, Robert Irwin (1987). Guardians of the Sea, History of the United States Coast Guard, 1915 to the Present. Naval Institute Press, Annapolis. ISBN 978-0-87021-720-3.
- Kelley, Michael P. (2002). Where We Were in Vietnam. Hellgate Press, Central Point, Oregon. ISBN 978-1-55571-625-7.
- Larzelere, Alex (1997). The Coast Guard at War, Vietnam, 1965-1975. Naval Institute Press, Annapolis. ISBN 978-1-55750-529-3.
- Naval Historical Center, U.S. Navy. "Vietnam Operational Archives". U.S. Navy. Archived from the original on 30 October 2020.
- Scotti, Paul C. (2000). Coast Guard Action in Vietnam: Stories of Those Who Served. Hellgate Press, Central Point, Oregon. ISBN 978-1-55571-528-1.
- Summers, Harry G. Jr. (1995). Historical Atlas of the Vietnam War. Houghton Mifflin Co., New York. ISBN 978-0-395-72223-7.
- Tulich, Eugene N. (1975). "The United States Coast Guard in South East Asia During the Vietnam Conflict" (asp). Coast Guard Historical Monograph. 1.
