= Joseph H. Underwood House =

Historic house in Maine, United States

- U.S. National Register of Historic Places
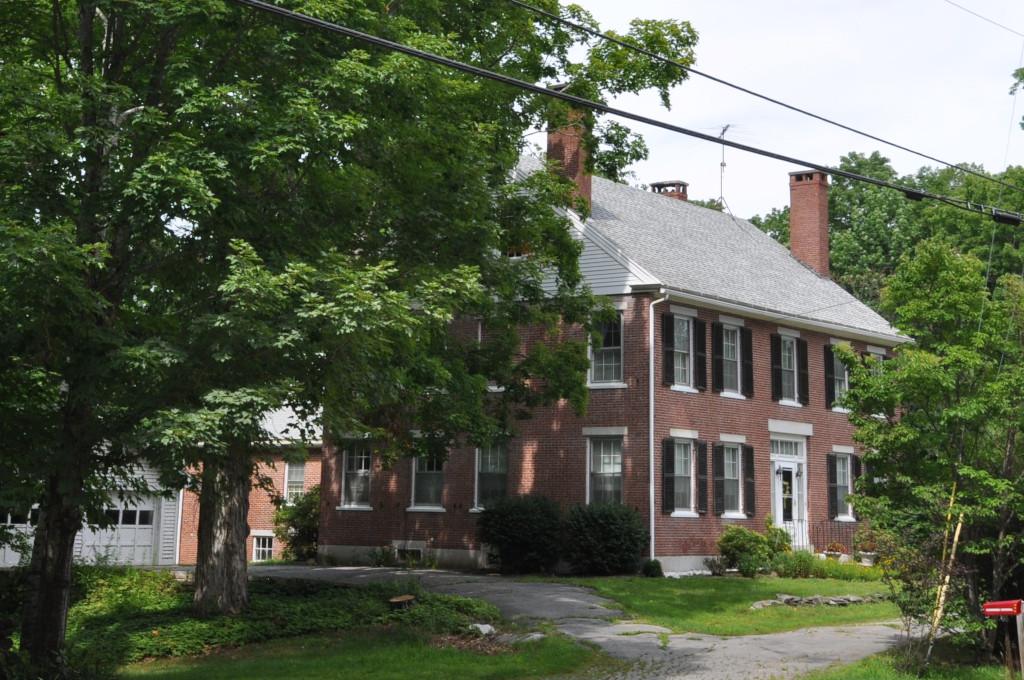

- Location within Maine Location within the United States
- Location: 1957 Main St., Fayette, Maine
- Coordinates: 44°24′33″N 70°2′2″W
- Area: 7.5 acres (3.0 ha)
- Built: 1837
- Architectural style: Greek Revival
- NRHP reference No.: 05001470
- Added to NRHP: December 28, 2005

The Joseph H. Underwood House is a historic house at 1957 Main Street in Fayette, Maine. Built in 1837, this large brick house was built for Joseph H. Underwood, one of the small community's leading businessmen and politicians of the first half of the 19th century. Underwood owned a mill and other local business, and served in town offices and the state legislature. His house was listed on the National Register of Historic Places in 2005.

== Description and history ==
The Joseph H. Underwood House stands on the north side of Main Street (Maine State Route 17) at its junction with North Wayne Street, in what is now a quiet and dispersed rural village. It is a 2 1/2-story brick structure, with a gable roof and end chimneys, and a single-story ell extending northward from the rear. The walls consist of brick laid in running bond, while the gable ends are framed in wood and finished in vinyl siding. The front facade is five bays wide, with the openings framed by granite sills and lintels. Windows are six-over-six sash, while the centered entrance has flanking sidelights and a wide multilight transom above. The front yard is handsomely landscaped, with a semicircular drive, and stone steps leading from the street to the drive in front of the house.

Joseph Underwood was born in New Hampshire, and moved to Fayette about 1807, where he soon afterward purchased the local general store. He reportedly owned the store for 55 years, expanding his business interests to include real estate and agriculture. He was one of the first people documented to breed Hereford cattle in the state, and was at his death in 1867 by far the wealthiest man in the small community. Underwood also served as a town selectman, and in the state legislature. This house, one of three he occupied in the town, was built for him in 1837.

== See also ==
- National Register of Historic Places listings in Kennebec County, Maine
