= Androscoggin =

Androscoggin may refer to:

- Androscoggin people, an Abnaki tribe who lived in what is now Maine and New Hampshire in the US
- Androscoggin County, Maine
- Androscoggin Lake
- Androscoggin Mill, Jay, Maine
- Androscoggin River in New Hampshire and Maine
- Camp Androscoggin, a summer camp in Wayne, Maine
