= Androscoggin Yacht Club =

- U.S. National Register of Historic Places
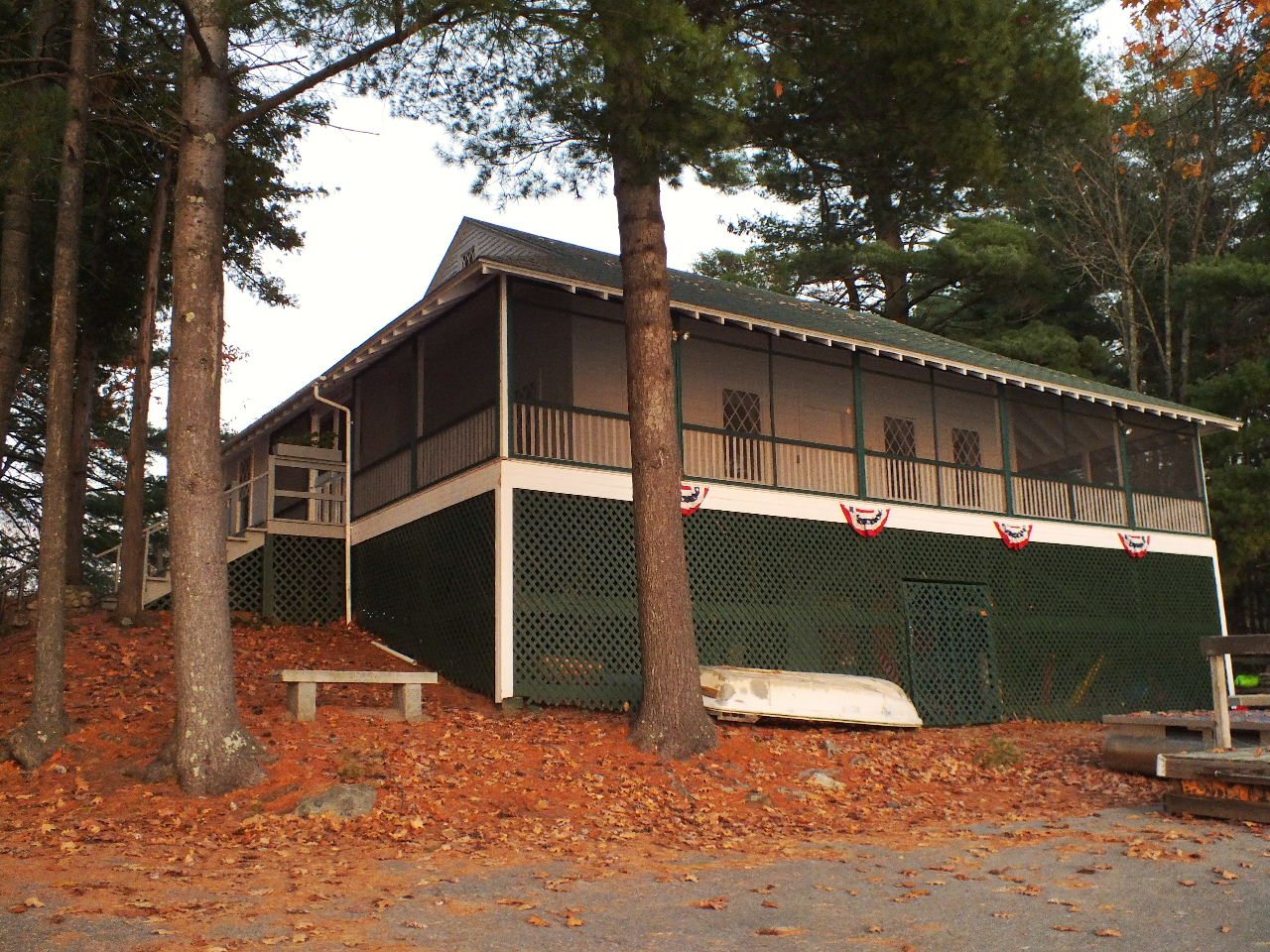

- Location within Maine Location within the United States
- Location: 22 Lake St. Wayne, Maine
- Coordinates: 44°20′52″N 70°4′8″W
- Area: 1.25 acres (0.51 ha)
- Built: 1912
- Architect: Carl W. Davis
- Architectural style: Vernacular; Craftsman
- NRHP reference No.: 12000893
- Added to NRHP: October 13, 2012

The Androscoggin Yacht Club is a private recreational and social club at 22 Lake Street in Wayne, Maine, on the shore of Androscoggin Lake. Founded in 1909, the club provides access to a beach and docks, and has a clubhouse available for the use of its members. The clubhouse was listed on the National Register of Historic Places in 2012, for its architecture and for the role the club played in the development of the region as a summer tourist destination.

== Description and history ==
The village center of Wayne is set between Androscoggin Lake to the south and Pocasset Lake to the north. The Androscoggin Yacht Club is located on the south side of the village, on a cove at the northeast end of the lake. The clubhouse is set on a high stone foundation, which has views of the lake. The clubhouse is a single story frame structure, with a stone chimney, gabled roof, and a three-sided wraparound porch. The exterior is clapboarded, and the interior is rustically finished. It is basically vernacular in design, but has diamond-pane windows and exposed rafter ends in the overhanging roof eaves, both Craftsman features. The bulk of the building interior is taken by the main club room, with smaller spaces set off for the kitchen, storage, and restrooms.

The club was founded in 1909 by a small group of summer residents, but quickly broadened its base to include a number of townspeople, who recognized the value of such an organization as a local social venue. The clubhouse was opened in 1912, designed by Carl Fuller Davis of Bridgeport, Connecticut. In its early years, the club sponsored regattas on the lake, and hosted dances and other social events. It continues to play a role in the social life of the community.

== See also ==
- National Register of Historic Places listings in Kennebec County, Maine
