= Kent Burying Ground =

Cemetery in Maine, USA

- U.S. National Register of Historic Places
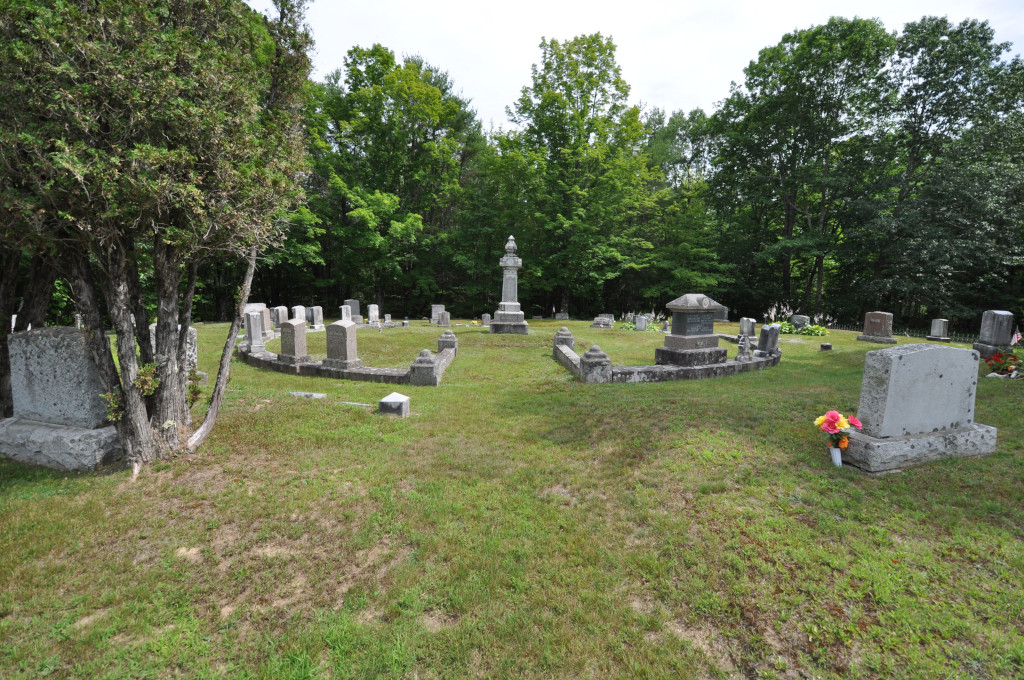

- Location within Maine Location within the United States
- Location: NE corner of Fayette Corner Rd. and Oak Hill Rd., Fayette, Maine
- Coordinates: 44.42013°N 70.07153°W
- Area: 0.4 acres (0.16 ha)
- Built: 1880
- Architect: Kent, Elias H.
- NRHP reference No.: 08001254
- Added to NRHP: December 31, 2008

Kent Burying Ground is a historic cemetery at the corner of Fayette Corner Road and Oak Hill Road in Fayette, Maine. Established in 1880 by Elias Kent, it is unusual for its layout of concentric rings around a central monument, only known in one other cemetery in the state, the Wing Family Cemetery in nearby Wayne. The cemetery was listed on the National Register of Historic Places in 2008.

== Description and history ==
The Kent Burying Ground is located in what is now a rural part of Fayette, where Fayette Corner Road bends from west to north, and Oak Hill Road continues east. The cemetery is located just northeast of this threeway junction, occupying a rectangular parcel of slightly more than one-third of an acre. It is laid out as a series of concentric circular paths, separated by earthen berms retained by low granite walls, on which the grave markers are placed. At the center of the cemetery is a memorial marker labeled "Kent", which serves not as a burial marker but as the cemetery's focal point. The cemetery is ringed by an original cast-iron picket fence, with a gate supported by slender granite posts and topped by an arch. Marked graves date from 1833 to the 21st century.

The cemetery was established about 1880 by Elias Kent, who was from a local family. At the time, Fayette Corner was the civic hub of the rural community. It is unclear why Kent chose the unusual layout. It is reminiscent of the rural cemetery style which was popular in urbanized areas during the mid-to-late 19th century, albeit on a much smaller scale. Kent may have been influenced by the Wing Family Cemetery, about 52 miles away in Wayne, which was established in 1867 and has a nearly identical plan.

== See also ==
- National Register of Historic Places listings in Kennebec County, Maine
