= Annie Louise Cary =

American opera singer

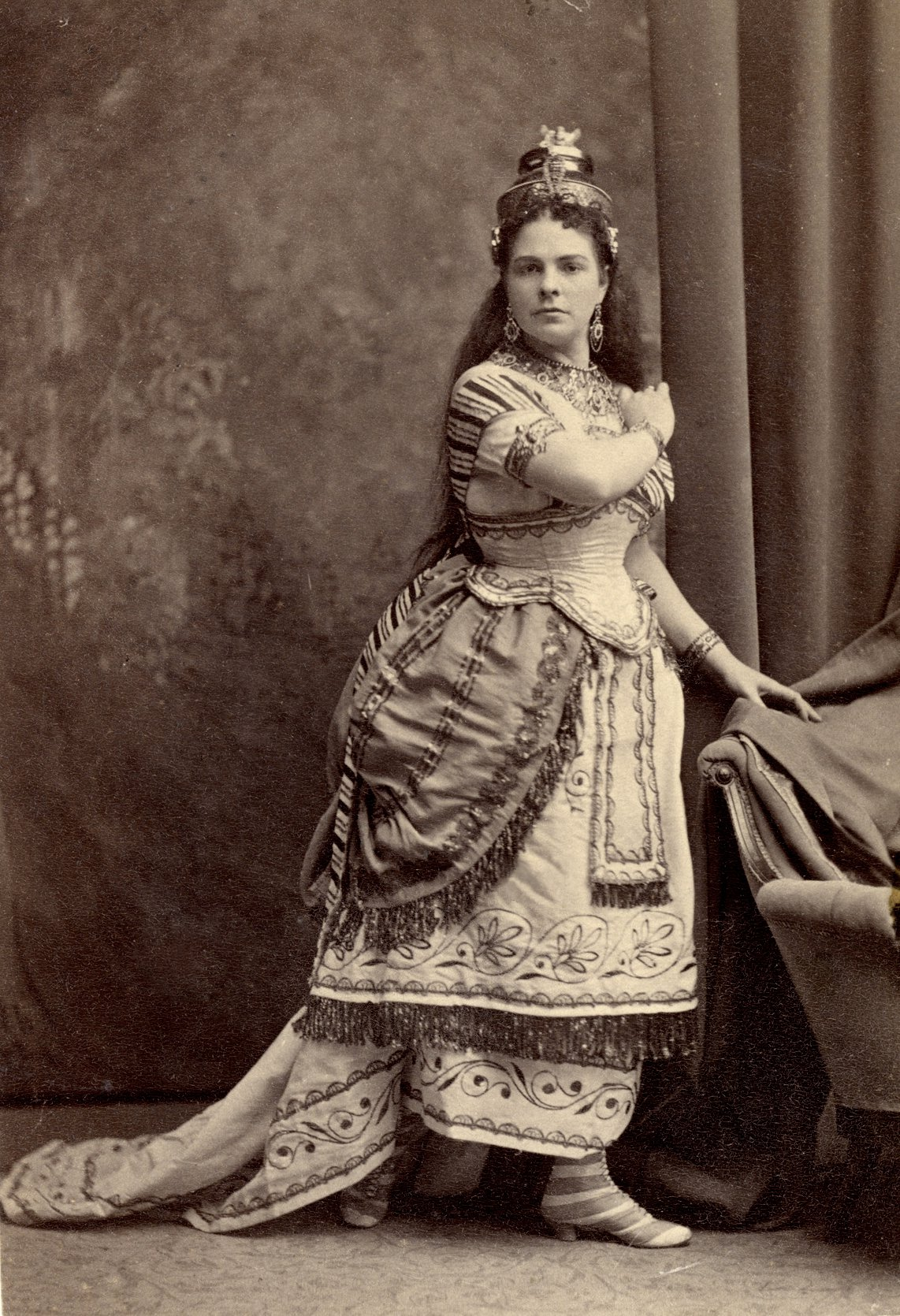

Signature
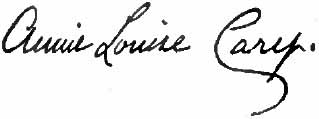

Annie Louise Cary (October 22, 1842 – April 3, 1921) was an American opera singer whose rich dramatic voice, three-octave range, and command of the grand style made her the foremost American contralto for a decade in the late 19th century.

== Origins and education ==
She was born in Wayne, Maine, the daughter of Nelson Howard Cary and his wife, Maria Stockbridge. After an early education in the common schools, she attended the female seminary at Gorham, Maine, and graduated in 1862. In 1866, her natural gifts as a singer becoming evident, she went to Italy and studied in Milan with Giovanni Corsi until January 1868. That year, she made her debut in Italian opera as a profundo contralto in Copenhagen under the direction of Achille Lorini.

== Operatic career ==
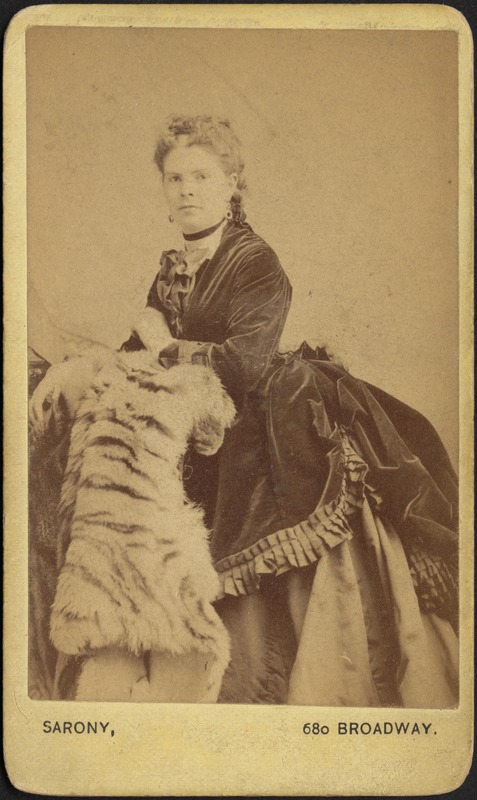
A. L. Cary, ca. 1859-1870. Carte de Visite Collection, Boston Public Library

The following summer was spent at Baden-Baden in study with Pauline Viardot, and in the autumn she began an engagement for Italian opera at Stockholm under the direction of Ferdinand Strakosch. After two months, she was engaged to sing at the Royal Swedish Opera, and sang her part in Italian to the Swedish of the other artists. The following summer she spent in Paris, studying with Giovanni Bottesini, a conductor and contra-bassist. In the autumn she went to Brussels to sing in Italian opera, and there made a contract with Messrs. Maurice and Max Strakosch for three years in the United States. In the winter of 1869/70 she studied in Paris, and during the spring in London with Henry C. Deacon, and sang at Drury Lane Theatre.

She made her first New York appearance in September 1870 in concert at Steinway Hall with Nilsson, Vieuxtemps, and Brignoli. For twelve years from that time she was constantly engaged for opera or concerts, appearing with Carlotta Patti, Mario, Albani, and others in America, until the winter of 1875/76, when she visited Moscow and St. Petersburg, and repeated the tour in the following winter.

Returning to America for the seasons of 1877-78 and 1878–79, she sang in opera with Clara Louise Kellogg and Marie Rose, under the management of director Strakosch. The three seasons following were given to opera with the Mapleson company, and to concerts and festivals in great variety. During the most active part of her professional career she sang at all the festivals given in New York, Boston, Cincinnati, Chicago, and Worcester. She also sang frequently in oratorio, and regularly participated in the concerts of the Brooklyn Philharmonic Society.

== Retirement ==
She married Charles Monson Raymond on June 29, 1882, and after that only sang in private or for charity; and occasionally she assisted the choir at her church. At the time she retired, she was the most popular singer in America.

She died at her home in Norwalk, Connecticut on April 3, 1921.
