= USCGC Point Welcome =

United States Coast Guard cutter

USCGC Point Welcome (WPB-82329)
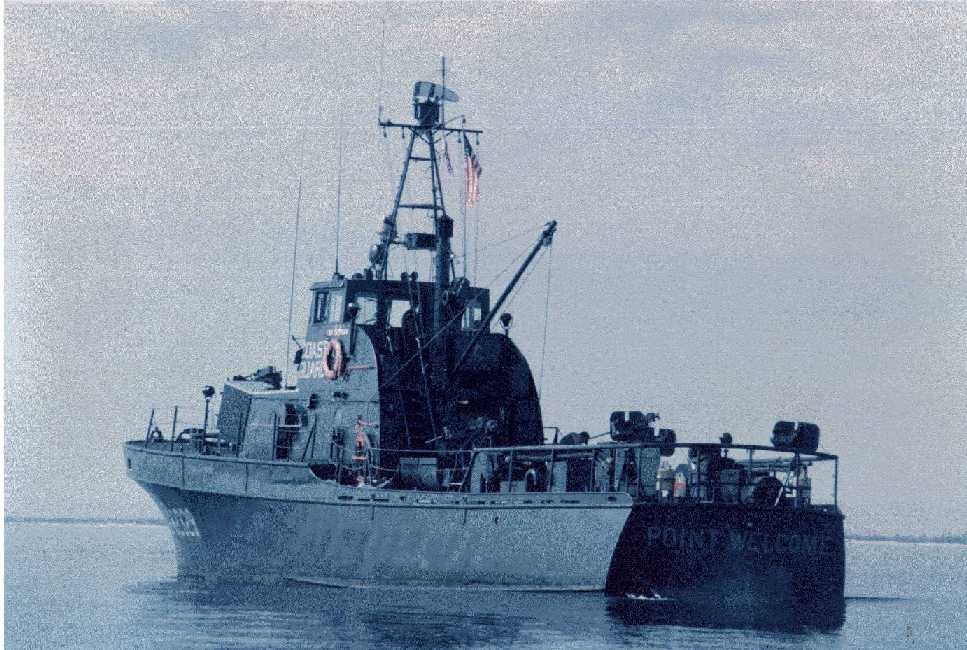
- USCGC Point Welcome on patrol in Vietnamese waters

History

United States
- Name: USCGC Point Welcome (WPB-82329)
- Namesake: Point Welcome, Aleutian Islands, Alaska, U.S.
- Owner: United States Coast Guard
- Builder: Coast Guard Yard, Curtis Bay, Maryland, U.S.
- Commissioned: 14 February 1962
- Decommissioned: 29 April 1970
- Honors and awards: Navy Unit Commendation; Meritorious Unit Commendation (Navy); Vietnam Service Medal with 2 silver; and 1 bronze service stars
- Fate: Transferred to Republic of Vietnam as RVNS Nguyễn Hấn (HQ-717), 29 April 1970

General characteristics
- Type: Patrol Boat (WPB)
- Displacement: 60 tons
- Length: 82 ft 10 in (25.25 m)
- Beam: 17 ft 7 in (5.36 m) max
- Draft: 5 ft 11 in (1.80 m)
- Propulsion: 2 × 600 hp (447 kW) Cummins diesel engines
- Speed: 16.8 knots (31.1 km/h; 19.3 mph)
- Range: 577 nmi (1,069 km) at 14.5 kn (26.9 km/h; 16.7 mph); 1,271 nmi (2,354 km) at 10.7 kn (19.8 km/h; 12.3 mph)
- Complement: Domestic service : 8 men; Vietnam service : 2 officers, 8 men
- Armament: 1962; 1 × Oerlikon 20 mm cannon; Vietnam service; 5 × M2 Browning machine guns; 1 × 81 mm M29 mortar

USCGC Point Welcome (WPB-82329) was an 82-foot (25 m) Point-class cutter constructed at the Coast Guard Yard at Curtis Bay, Maryland in 1961 for use as a law enforcement and search and rescue patrol boat.

Coast Guard policy in 1962 was not to name cutters under 100 feet (30 m) in length, so she was designated as WPB-82329 when commissioned and renamed Point Welcome in January 1964 when the Coast Guard began naming cutters longer than 65 feet (20 m). She was notable for being the victim of a friendly fire incident during the Vietnam War.

== Construction and design details ==
Point Welcome was built to accommodate an 8-man crew. She was powered by two 600 hp (447 kW) VT600 Cummins diesel main drive engines and had two five-bladed 42 in (1.1 m) propellers. The main drive engines were later replaced by 800 hp (597 kW) VT800 Cummins engines. Water tank capacity was 1,550 U.S. gallons (5,900 L) and fuel capacity was 1,840 U.S. gallons (7,000 L) at 95% full. Engine exhaust was ported through the transom rather than through a conventional stack permitting a 360 degree view from the bridge a useful feature in search and rescue work.

She had a steel hull, an aluminum superstructure with a longitudinally framed construction to save weight. Controls were located on the bridge which allowed one-man operation and eliminated an engineer watch in the engine room. For short periods, a crew of four men could operate the cutter, however, the need for rest brought the practical crew to eight for normal service. The screws were designed for ease of replacement and could be changed without removing the cutter from the water. A clutch-in idle speed of three knots helped to conserve fuel on lengthy patrols and she had an eighteen knot maximum speed.

Interior access was through a watertight door on the starboard side aft of the deckhouse, which contained the cabin for the officer-in-charge and the executive officer, a small arms locker, scuttlebutt, desk and head. Access to the lower deck and engine room was via a ladder, at the bottom of which was the galley, mess and recreation deck. A watertight door at the front of the mess bulkhead led to the crew quarters which was ten feet long with six stowable bunks, three on each side. Forward of the bunks was the crew's head with sink, shower and commode, interior spaces were air-conditioned. Accommodation for a 13-man crew were installed for Vietnam War service.

== History ==
After delivery in 1962, Point Welcome was assigned a homeport of Everett, Washington, where she served as law enforcement and search and rescue patrol boat.

In April 1965, at the request of the United States Navy, she was tasked for service in South Vietnam and assigned to Coast Guard Squadron One in support of Operation Market Time, along with 16 others of her class. While the crew completed overseas training and weapons qualifications at Coast Guard Island and Camp Parks, California, Point Welcome was loaded onto a merchant ship, and transported to Subic Bay, Philippines in May 1965. She was refitted for combat service with the installation of single-sideband radio, additional floodlights, phone circuits and four M2 machine guns. The original bow-mounted machine gun was replaced with a combination over-under .50 caliber machine gun/81mm trigger-fired mortar, developed by the Coast Guard for service in South Vietnam. For service in Vietnam, two additional commissioned officers were added to the crew to add seniority in the mission of interdicting vessels at sea.

Point Welcome was assigned to Division 12 of Squadron One to be based at Da Nang, along with USCGC Point Arden, USCGC Point Caution, USCGC Point Dume, USCGC Point Ellis, USCGC Point Gammon and USCGC Point Orient. After sea trials, the Division left Subic Bay for Da Nang on 16 July 1965 in the company of USS Snohomish County, as a temporary support ship. After almost two weeks at sea, they arrived at their new duty station on 20 July and began patrolling the coastal waters near Danang. Duty consisted of boarding Vietnamese junks to search for weapons and checking the identification papers of those on board. Permanent engineering and logistic support of Division 12 was provided by the US Navy non-self-propelled floating workshop, YR-71. During this time, the WPB's were directed to paint the hulls and superstructures formula 20 deck gray to cover the Coast Guard's normal white paint to increase the effectiveness of night patrols.

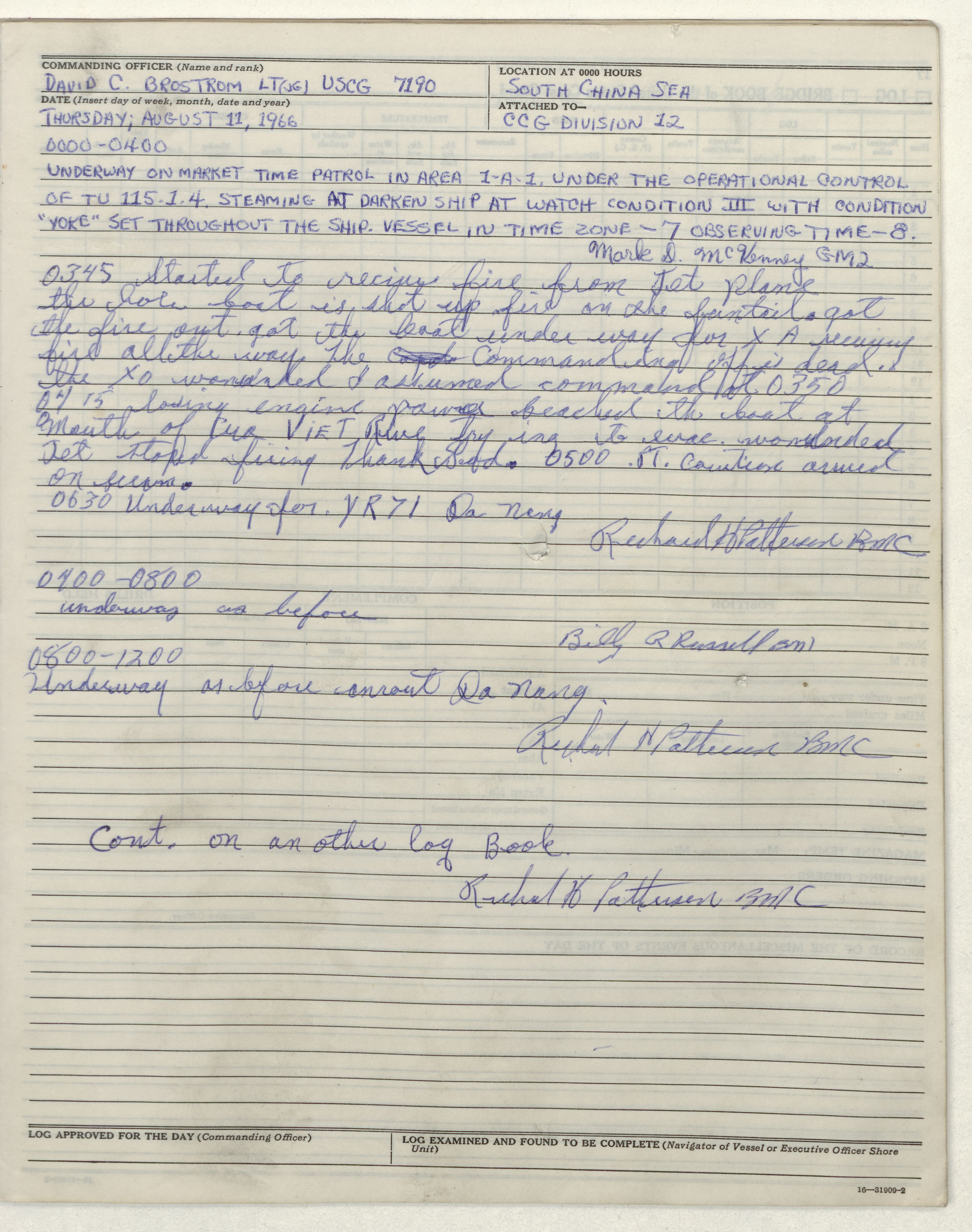
Logbook page from the day of the friendly fire incident

=== Friendly fire ===
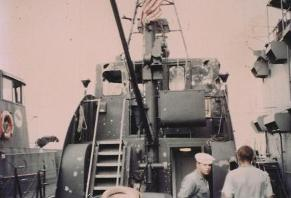
Aft view of the bridge of Point Welcome after the friendly fire incident of 11 August 1966

Point Welcome was about three-quarters of a mile south of the 17th parallel, in the limits of the Vietnamese Demilitarized Zone (DMZ), when she was attacked in the pre-dawn hours of 11 August 1966 by three U.S. Air Force aircraft while on patrol in the waters near the mouth of the Cửa Việt River. Her commanding officer, Lieutenant Junior Grade (LTJG) David Brostrom, and Engineman Second Class Jerry Phillips, were killed, two of seven Coast Guardsmen killed in action during the Vietnam War. The ship's executive officer, LTJG Ross Bell was severely wounded and several of the crew injured, leaving Chief Boatswain's Mate Richard Patterson in command. A South Vietnamese liaison officer, LTJG Do Viet Vien, and civilian journalist Tim Page, were also aboard.

Patterson saved the cutter and the surviving crew at great risk to himself. He was awarded a Bronze Star with the combat "V" device for his actions that were described in his award citation:

"The first attack caused a blazing gasoline fire on the fantail of the cutter that threatened to engulf the entire after section of the vessel. Chief Patterson, displaying the finest qualities of bravery and leadership, took charge of the situation and using a fire hose, forced the flaming liquid over the side, thus extinguishing the fire. Even as he was accomplishing this task, he saw the second aircraft attack rip through the pilothouse killing the cutter's commanding officer and seriously wounding the executive officer and the helmsman. Unhesitatingly, and with complete disregard for his personal safety, Chief Patterson climbed to the bridge and took command. He ordered the crew to carry the wounded to the comparative safety of the below decks area. Alone on the bridge, he then maneuvered the cutter at high speed to avoid subsequent attacks. When it became apparent that he could not successfully evade the attacking aircraft, he ran the cutter close ashore and directed the crew to abandon ship. Under his composed leadership, the wounded were wrapped in life jackets and paired with the able-bodied before going over the side. Chief Patterson kept his crew calm and organized while they were in the water and until they were picked up by rescue craft."

Point Caution came to the assistance of the Point Welcome and along with other units, rescued those in the water. Then Patterson and those of his crew who were not seriously wounded returned to their cutter and sailed Point Welcome back to Da Nang under her own power. She was repaired and after a three-month overhaul, returned to service. Investigations by the Military Assistance Command Vietnam (MACV) involving 37 witnesses were conducted from 15 to 23 August 1966 and concluded with a statement to the Commandant of the Coast Guard that: In 1966 the board of investigation issued its 159-page record and recommendations, including "That no disciplinary action be taken against any personnel involved in the incident." And further:

"It is evident from the record that there was a lack of coordination between different component forces operating in the same area, and that existing orders and instructions pertaining to identification and recognition of friendly forces were not observed."

=== Tet 1968 action ===
On 29 February and 1 March 1968, Point Welcome assisted in the destruction of an SL-class North Vietnamese trawler near Cu Lao Re island, 70 miles (110 km) southeast of Da Nang. On the afternoon of 29 February, the USCGC Androscoggin took the trawler under surveillance after it was detected by a P-2 Neptune aircraft 150 miles (240 km) south of the DMZ. Point Welcome and USCGC Point Grey, with two U.S. Navy Patrol Craft Fast (PCFs), waited close to shore as the trawler approached, with Androscoggin trailing.

In the early morning of 1 March 1968 as the trawler closed to within seven miles (11 km) of the coast, Androscoggin closed and challenged the vessel. After receiving no response, Androscoggin illuminated the target with 5-inch (130 mm) star shells. The trawler, positively identified as a North Vietnamese SL-class vessel, opened fire on the cutter with recoilless rifle and machine gun fire. Androscoggin returned fire with her 5-inch (130 mm) guns, scoring one hit on the trawler's "aft starboard side." As the trawler headed for the beach, two helicopters took it under fire while the Point Welcome, Point Grey and PCFs closed. Point Welcome fired 81-mm mortar illumination rounds, while Point Grey and the swift boats engaged with .50 caliber machine guns. The North Vietnamese vessel grounded 50 yards (46 m) from the mouth of the Cầu River. Point Welcome hit the target with two 81mm mortar rounds and the trawler exploded. The cutters were struck by debris but suffered no casualties.

=== Vietnamization ===
She was transferred to the Republic of Vietnam Navy as RVNS Nguyễn Hấn (HQ-717), 29 April 1970.
