= Wing Family Cemetery =

- U.S. National Register of Historic Places
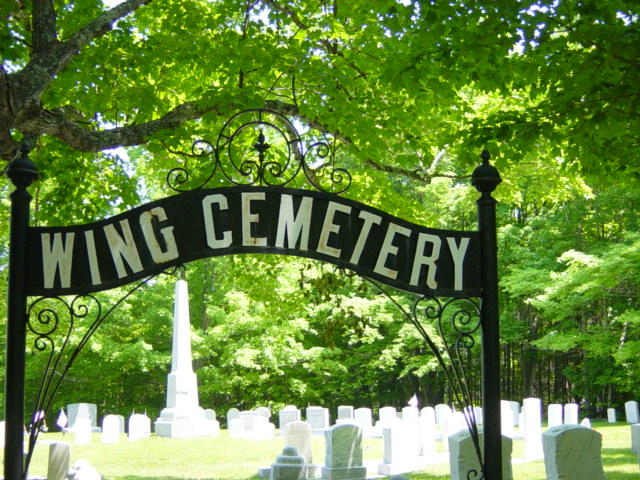
- Wing "Ring" Cemetery in Wayne, Maine

- Location within Maine Location within the United States
- Location: Eastern side of Pond Rd., north of its junction with SR 133, Wayne, Maine
- Coordinates: 44.37038°N 70.06626°W
- Area: 0.4 acres (0.16 ha)
- Built: 1867
- Architect: Alonzo Wing; James Norris Wing, builder
- NRHP reference No.: 91001514
- Added to NRHP: October 16, 1991

Wing Family Cemetery is a historic cemetery in Wayne, Maine. Established as a family cemetery in 1867, it is one of the state's most distinctive small cemeteries, organized with concentric circles around a central monument. The cemetery was added to the National Register of Historic Places in 1991.

== Location ==
The Wing Family Cemetery is located in a rural setting north of Wayne's village center, on the east side of Pond Road near Pocasset Lake. It occupies a square parcel, which is ringed by a cut granite stone wall. A line of maple trees separates the street from the westernmost wall.

== History ==
The Wing "Ring" Cemetery was founded by the descendants of the seven sons of Simeon Wing & Mary Allen. The seven sons (Thomas, Ebenezer, Dr. Moses, Aaron, Allen, Simeon & William) emigrated from Sandwich (Pocasset, now Bourne), Barnstable Co., Massachusetts to what was originally called New Sandwich at the end of the Revolutionary War. The brothers settled around the body of water originally called Wing Pond, but now known as Lake Pocasset.

Originally, the family had a traditional "burying place" on the homestead of the youngest son, William (as the parents lived with William for the last years of their lives). In 1867, descendants of the brothers formed a Wing Cemetery Corporation for the purpose of creating a new memorial to their deceased members. They leveled off the top of a hill, dug down several feet to remove all of the larger rocks, and graded the lot. Alonzo Wing of Wisconsin drafted the "ringed" formation, aligning the stones in concentric circles around a central obelisk. James Norris Wing learned the trade of stone-cutting and supervised the creation of curved granite footings to form the base of the concentric circles (upon which the gravestones would be placed).

The process took several years, and hundreds of dollars (which was privately financed by the Cemetery Corporation through donations from family members). The cemetery was finally completed about 1871.

== See also ==
- Kent Burying Ground, also a concentric ring cemetery
- National Register of Historic Places listings in Kennebec County, Maine
