= Richard H. Patterson =

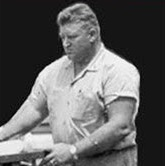
- Born: November 6, 1931; Florida
- Died: April 12, 2010 (aged 78)
- Other name: Richard "Pat" Patterson
- Occupation: Coast Guardsman
- Known for: taking control of a damaged ship

Richard H. Patterson (November 6, 1931 – April 12, 2010) was a chief petty officer in the United States Coast Guard, decorated for saving the crew of his vessel, USCGC Point Welcome after the skipper and executive officer became casualties during a 1966 friendly fire attack, in Vietnam.

Patterson was born in 1931 and grew up in Florida. He enlisted in the Coast Guard as a young man, and by the mid-1960s he was a chief boatswain's mate.

== Attack on Point Welcome ==
U.S. Coast Guard cutter Point Welcome was on a three-day patrol, near Vietnam's demilitarized zone when, in the early morning of August 11, 1966, she was attacked by a United States Air Force Martin B-57 Canberra, in a case of friendly fire. Standard procedure for small vessels, like Point Welcome, was to run without lights, in areas where enemy vessels might be encountered.

The first strafing run ignited a fuel can on the vessel's fantail, which Patterson extinguished. The second run hit the bridge, killing the ship's captain, Lieutenant Junior Grade (LTJG) David Brostrom, and Engineman Second Class Jerry Phillips, two of seven Coast Guardsmen killed in action during the Vietnam War. The ship's executive officer, LTJG Ross Bell was severely wounded and several of the crew injured. Patterson proceeded to the bridge and took control of the cutter, executing a series of evasive maneuvers that prevented the B-57 from hitting her again. As the rudder was damaged he steered by controlling the cutter's two propellers.

When the B-57 abandoned its attack, after running out of ammunition, he proceeded to the nearest base, until more USAF aircraft arrived to continue the attack. Patterson grounded the vessel and ordered the crew to abandon ship, ensuring the wounded had life jackets and were with someone able-bodied.

Patterson was awarded a Bronze Star for his actions.

== Legacy ==
- In 2002 the Coast Guard named the recreation center at Training Center Petaluma near Petaluma, California after Patterson.
- In 2007 he was inducted in the Surface Navy Hall of Fame.
