= USCGC Winona =

United States Coast Guard cutter

Coordinates: 48°22′N 134°26′W

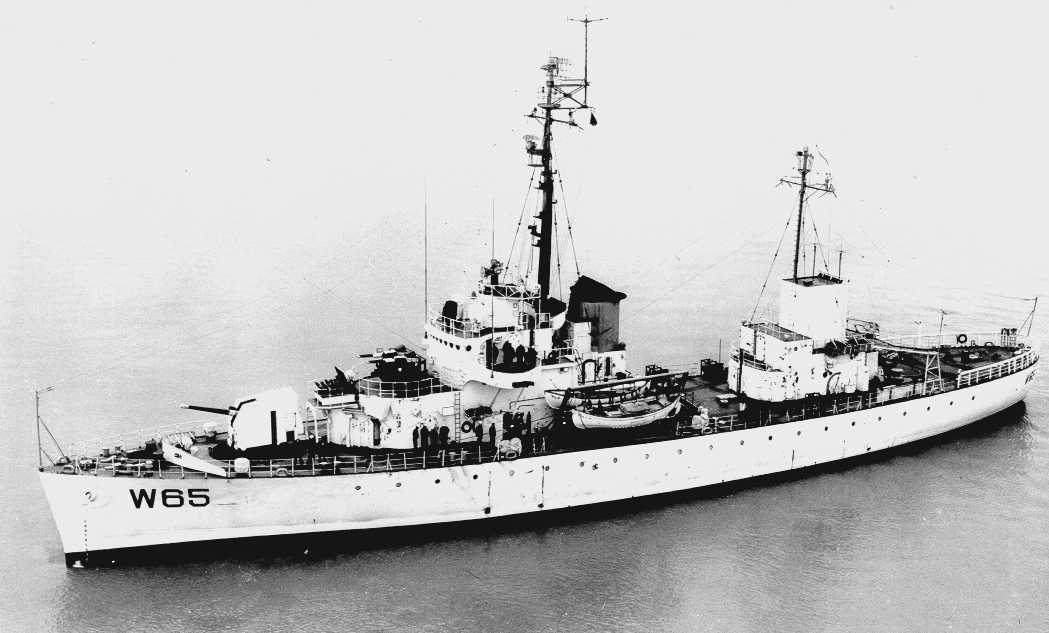
- USCGC Winona (WHEC-65), circa 1965

History

United States
- Owner: US Coast Guard
- Builder: Western Pipe & Steel
- Cost: $4,239,702 (hull and machinery)
- Laid down: 8 November 1944
- Launched: 22 April 1945
- Christened: Winona
- Commissioned: 19 April 1946
- Decommissioned: 31 May 1974
- Reclassified: WPG-65 to WHEC-65
- Fate: Scrapped, 1974
- Notes: WPS Hull No. 152.

General characteristics
- Type: Owasco-class cutter
- Displacement: 1,978 full (1966); 1,342 light (1966)
- Length: 254 ft (77.4 m) oa.; 245 ft (74.7 m) pp.
- Beam: 43 ft 1 in (13.1 m)
- Draft: 17 ft 3 in (5.3 m) (1966)
- Installed power: 4,000 shp (3,000 kW) (1945)
- Propulsion: 1 × Westinghouse electric motor driven by a turbine, (1945)
- Speed: 17 knots (31 km/h; 20 mph).
- Range: 6,157 mi (9,909 km) at 17 knots; 10,376 mi (16,699 km) at 10 knots (19 km/h; 12 mph) (1966)
- Complement: 10 officers, 3 warrants, 130 enlisted (1966)
- Sensors & processing systems: Detection Radar: SPS-23, SPS-29, Mk 26, Mk 27 (1966); Sonar: SQS-1 (1966)
- Armament: 1945: 2 × twin 5 in/38 cal. dual-purpose gun mounts; 2 × quad 40 mm AA gun mounts; 2 × depth charge tracks; 6 × "K" gun depth charge projectors; 1 × Hedgehog projector.; 1966: 1 × 5 in/38 cal. dual-purpose gun mount; 1 × Hedgehog projector
- Notes: Fuel capacity: 141,755 gal (Oil, 95%).

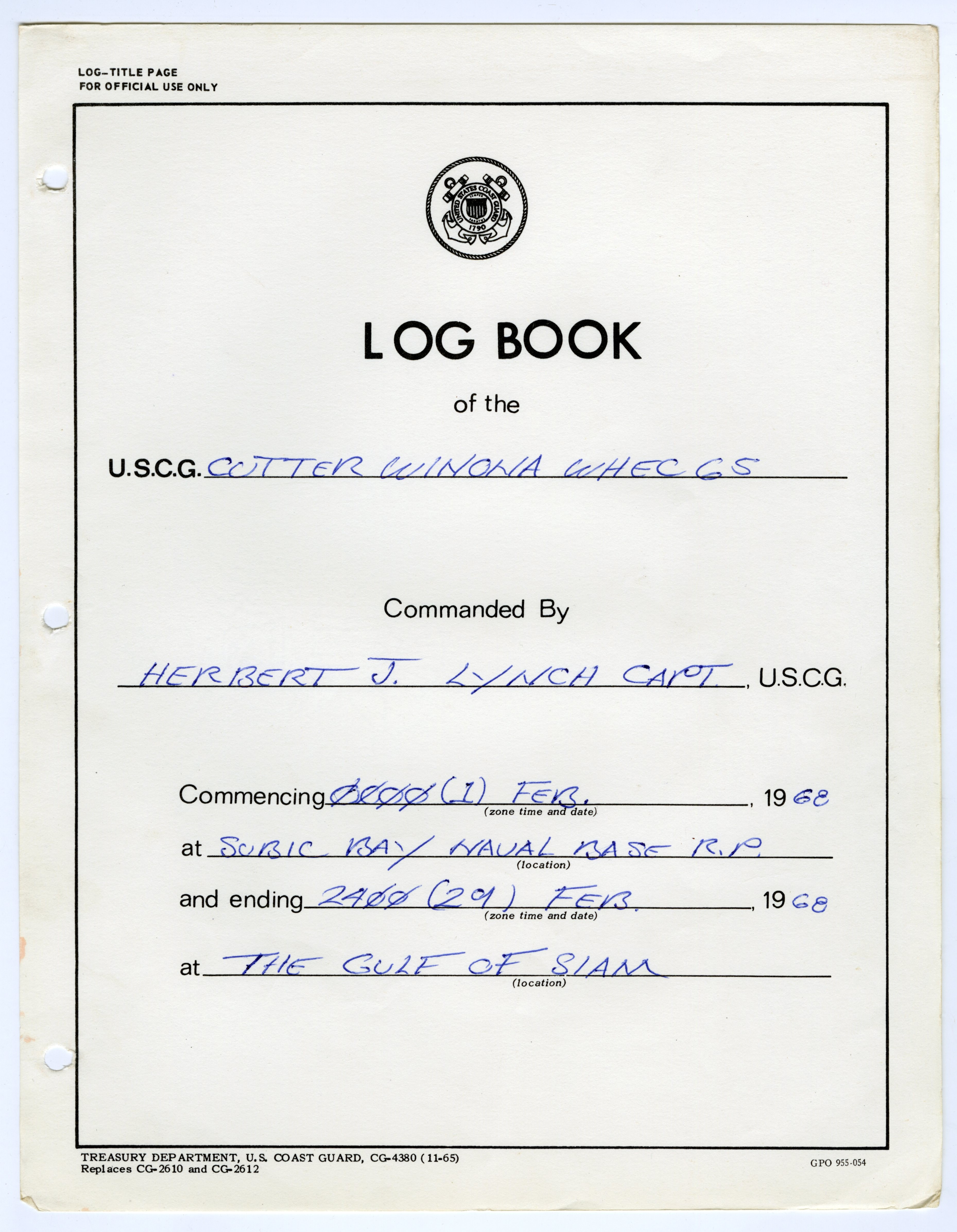
USCG Winona Logbook February 1–29, 1968 - Cover

USCGC Winona (WHEC-65) was an Owasco class high endurance cutter built for World War II service with the United States Coast Guard. The war ended before the ship was completed and consequently she did not see wartime service until the Vietnam War.

Winona was built by Western Pipe & Steel at the company's San Pedro shipyard. Named after Winona Lake, Indiana, she was commissioned as a patrol gunboat with ID number WPG-65 on 19 April 1946. Her ID was later changed to WHEC-65 (HEC for "High Endurance Cutter" - the "W" signifies a Coast Guard vessel)

== Peacetime service ==
From 15 August 1946 to 11 September 1947, Winona was stationed at San Pedro, California, and used for law enforcement, ocean station, and search and rescue operations. She was subsequently homeported at Port Angeles, Washington, until 31 May 1974.

On 17 November 1948, she towed the disabled MV Herald of Morning. On 10 June 1949, she assisted FV Alice B 2 miles off South Amphitrite Point. On 13 February 1950, she towed the disabled MV Edgecombe to Seattle, Washington. On 16 June 1951, she escorted FV Sea Lark to Ketchikan, Alaska. On 18 and 19 March 1952, she assisted the disabled MV Darton until relieved by a commercial tug. From 23 to 25 December 1952, she assisted MV Maple Cove at 48°22’N, 134°26’W. On 13 February 1954, she assisted FV Western Fisherman. On 20 December 1954, she medevaced a crewman from MV General Pope. She patrolled the Gold Cup Races at Seattle, Washington, on 7 August 1955. Winona served on Bering Sea patrol from July to September 1956. She was back performing that same task from 20 July to 21 September 1963.

== Vietnam War ==
Winona was assigned to Coast Guard Squadron Three, South Vietnam, from 25 January to 17 October 1968. On 1 March the Winona sank a North Vietnamese trawler designated T-A. Damage controlman first class Thomas Lisk was on board at the time, and reported that a round penetrated the hull and bounce repeatedly around the room but fortunately neither he nor any shipmates were injured.

== Return to peacetime duties ==
On 31 January 1969, Winona stood by MV Belmona following a fire 15 miles southwest of Cape Flattery until commercial tugs arrived. On 20 July 1969, she assisted in the operations following the sinking of a barge loaded with diesel fuel near Admiralty Inlet. On 28 October 1970, she provided medical assistance to Urea Maru 300 miles off San Francisco.

== Decommissioning ==
The ship was decommissioned on 31 May 1974 and was laid-up at the US Coast Guard Base, Alameda, California until she was scrapped in late 1976.

== See also ==
- Action of 1 March 1968
