= USCGC Androscoggin (WHEC-68) =

Former ship of the United States Coast Guard

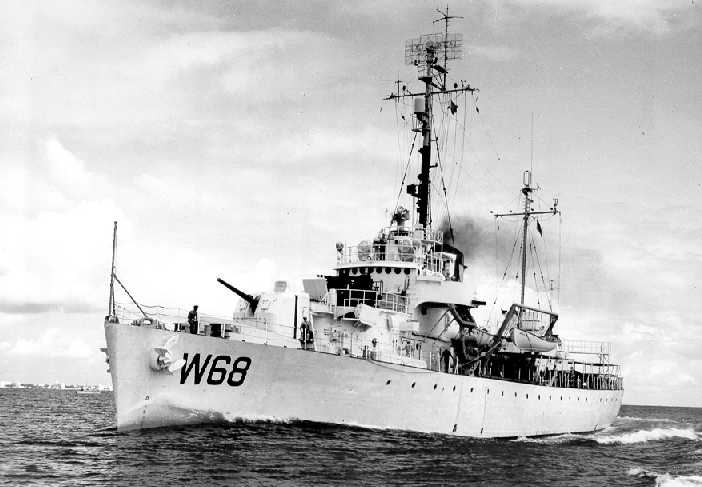
- USCGC Androscoggin (WHEC-68), in the Gulf of Mexico, 13 August 1958

History

United States
- Name: Androscoggin
- Operator: United States Coast Guard
- Builder: Western Pipe & Steel
- Cost: US$4,239,702 (hull and machinery)
- Launched: 16 September 1945
- Acquired: 26 September 1946
- Commissioned: 26 September 1946
- Decommissioned: 27 February 1973
- Fate: Sold for scrap, 7 October 1974

General characteristics
- Type: Owasco-class cutter
- Displacement: 1,978 full (1966); 1,342 light (1966)
- Length: 254 ft (77.4 m) oa.; 245 ft (74.7 m) pp.
- Beam: 43 ft 1 in (13.1 m)
- Draft: 17 ft 3 in (5.3 m) (1966)
- Installed power: 4,000 shp (3,000 kW) (1945)
- Propulsion: 1 × Westinghouse electric motor driven by a turbine, (1945)
- Speed: 17 knots (31 km/h; 20 mph).
- Range: 6,157 mi (9,909 km) at 17 knots; 10,376 mi (16,699 km) at 10 knots (19 km/h; 12 mph) (1966)
- Complement: 10 officers, 3 warrants, 130 enlisted (1966)
- Sensors & processing systems: Detection Radar: SPS-23, SPS-29, Mk 26, Mk 27 (1966); Sonar: SQS-1 (1966)
- Armament: 1945: 2 × twin 5 in/38 cal. dual-purpose gun mounts; 2 × quad 40 mm AA gun mounts; 2 × depth charge tracks; 6 × "K" gun depth charge projectors; 1 × Hedgehog projector.; 1966: 1 × 5 in/38 cal. dual-purpose gun mount; 1 × Hedgehog projector
- Notes: Fuel capacity: 141,755 gal (Oil, 95%).

USCGC Androscoggin (WHEC-68) was an Owasco-class high endurance cutter built for World War II service with the United States Coast Guard. The war ended before the ship was completed and consequently Androscoggin did not see wartime service until the Vietnam War.

Androscoggin was built by Western Pipe & Steel at the company's San Pedro shipyard. Named after Androscoggin Lake, Maine, she was commissioned as a patrol gunboat with ID number WPG-68 on 26 September 1946. Her ID was later changed to WHEC-68 (HEC for "High Endurance Cutter" - the "W" signifies a Coast Guard vessel).

== Service history ==
Androscoggin was stationed at Boston, Massachusetts, in 1947 and 1948. She was used primarily on ocean station duty in the North Atlantic. From 1948 to 3 July 1949, she was stationed at New York City. She was decommissioned and stored at the Coast Guard Yard, Curtis Bay, Maryland, from 31 October 1949 to 8 May 1950. On 8 May 1950, Androscoggin received the crew from USCGC Mocoma, was recommissioned, and stationed at Miami Beach, Florida.

Androscoggin was subsequently used primarily for law enforcement and search and rescue operations, but also served several ocean station tours. On 29 and 30 May 1952, she towed a disabled U.S. Navy PBM Mariner aircraft 60 miles (97 km) southeast of Miami to Miami, Florida. In 1956, she served on Campeche Patrol. In April and May 1956, she was assigned special duty relating to Loran-C testing and visited Ecuador, Jamaica, Colombia, and Panama. In July 1956, she served on the annual reserve cruise to San Juan, Puerto Rico, and Port-au-Prince, Haiti. From 17 April to 4 July 1959, she shared International Ice Patrol duty with USCGC Acushnet. She sailed to Reykjavík, Iceland, in January 1960 on a special mission.

In November 1961, she took part in a special mission involving the USAF and the Air National Guard relating to the Berlin crisis. In 1962, the Androscoggin served as Coast Guard schoolship at the U.S. Navy Fleet Sonar School, Key West, Florida.

In late August 1965, she evacuated Cuban refugees from Cay Sal to Key West. During November 17, 19, and 20, 1965, the cutter held movie operations in support of the film, Assault on a Queen. On 10 January 1966, she rescued the crew from the sinking MV Lampsis and unsuccessfully attempted to save the vessel. On 3 February 1966, she stood by the distressed MV Aroin until a commercial tug arrived. On 19 February 1966, she rescued three Cuban refugees from Anguila Cay and transported them to Miami. On 25 May 1966, she embarked 12 Cuban refugees from Cay Lobos and transported them to Key West.

=== Vietnam War ===
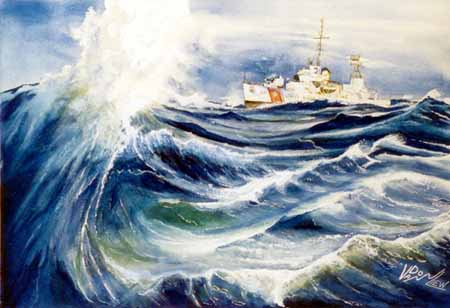
Weather decks secure by Don Van Liew

Androscoggin was assigned to Coast Guard Squadron Three, South Vietnam, from 4 December 1967 to 4 August 1968 in direct support of Operation Market Time. On 1 March 1968, she assisted in the destruction of an enemy steel trawler in a gun battle at the mouth of the Song Cau River. In May 1968, she rescued 27 Vietnamese from the South China Sea.

=== Return to peacetime duties ===
In 1969, Androscoggin assisted the Dutch MV Alida Gothern. On 19 February 1970, she stood by the disabled MV Stellanova until a commercial tug arrived. On 29 April 1970, she provided medical assistance to USS Dahlgren off Bermuda.

She was decommissioned on 27 February 1973, and sold for scrap on 7 October 1974.
