= Fayette, Maine =

Town in Maine, United States

- Town
- Location in Kennebec County and the state of Maine
- Coordinates: 44°27′38″N 70°05′52″W
- Country: United States
- State: Maine
- County: Kennebec
- Incorporated: February 28, 1795
- Villages: Fayette; North Fayette

Area
  - Total: 31.51 sq mi (81.61 km^{2})
  - Land: 29.17 sq mi (75.55 km^{2})
  - Water: 2.34 sq mi (6.06 km^{2})
- Elevation: 584 ft (178 m)

Population (2020)
  - Total: 1,160
  - Density: 40/sq mi (15.4/km^{2})
- Time zone: UTC-5 (Eastern (EST))
  - Summer (DST): UTC-4 (EDT)
- ZIP Code: 04349
- Area code: 207
- FIPS code: 23-24950
- GNIS feature ID: 582475
- Website: www.fayettemaine.org

Fayette is a town in Kennebec County, Maine, United States. The population was 1,160 as of the 2020 census. A popular recreation spot in central Maine, Fayette is part of the Winthrop Lakes Region.

== History ==
Fayette was first settled as Sterling (or Starling) Plantation in 1781, and became incorporated as the town of Fayette on February 28, 1795. Other sources state that Starling Plantation was first settled in 1779 on 7,000 acres granted by the State of Massachusetts to "Robert Paige and associates." Further publishings indicate that one Asa Wiggin laid claim to clearing the first land in Starling Plantation in the year 1779. Fayette was named for the Marquis de Lafayette, the French nobleman who offered his services to the Americans during the Revolution. Kent Burying Ground, which was built in 1880, is located in Fayette.

== Geography ==
According to the United States Census Bureau, the town has a total area of 31.51 square miles (81.61 km^{2}), of which 29.17 square miles (75.55 km^{2}) is land and 2.34 square miles (6.06 km^{2}) is water. Fayette is home to nine lakes and ponds, which are all popular sites for recreation.

List of Lakes and Ponds in Fayette
Name of Lake or Pond	Area in Acres	Adjoining Towns or Cities
Basin Pond	27	None
Burgess Pond	24	None
David Pond	284	Chesterville
Echo Lake	1185	Mt. Vernon, Readfield
Hales Pond	82	None
Lovejoy Pond	372	Readfield, Wayne
Mosher Pond	76	None
Parker Pond	1610	Vienna
Tilton Pond	114	None

== Demographics ==
Historical population
Census	Pop.	Note	%±
1800	532		—
1810	804		51.1%
1820	824		2.5%
1830	1,049		27.3%
1840	1,016		−3.1%
1850	1,085		6.8%
1860	910		−16.1%
1870	900		−1.1%
1880	765		−15.0%
1890	649		−15.2%
1900	560		−13.7%
1910	533		−4.8%
1920	523		−1.9%
1930	396		−24.3%
1940	438		10.6%
1950	397		−9.4%
1960	328		−17.4%
1970	447		36.3%
1980	812		81.7%
1990	855		5.3%
2000	1,040		21.6%
2010	1,140		9.6%
2020	1,160		1.8%
U.S. Decennial Census

=== 2010 census ===
As of the census of 2010, there were 1,140 people, 491 households, and 330 families living in the town. The population density was 39.1 inhabitants per square mile (15.1/km^{2}). There were 813 housing units at an average density of 27.9 per square mile (10.8/km^{2}). The racial makeup of the town was 97.6% White, 0.4% African American, 0.1% Native American, 0.5% Asian, 0.1% Pacific Islander, 0.2% from other races, and 1.1% from two or more races. Hispanic or Latino of any race were 0.8% of the population.

There were 491 households, of which 24.6% had children under the age of 18 living with them, 57.2% were married couples living together, 7.1% had a female householder with no husband present, 2.9% had a male householder with no wife present, and 32.8% were non-families. 25.1% of all households were made up of individuals, and 9% had someone living alone who was 65 years of age or older. The average household size was 2.32 and the average family size was 2.75.

The median age in the town was 48 years. 18.2% of residents were under the age of 18; 4.9% were between the ages of 18 and 24; 21.1% were from 25 to 44; 40.6% were from 45 to 64; and 15.2% were 65 years of age or older. The gender makeup of the town was 49.1% male and 50.9% female.

=== 2000 census ===
As of the census of 2000, there were 1,040 people, 417 households, and 296 families living in the town. The population density was 35.6 inhabitants per square mile (13.7/km^{2}). There were 690 housing units at an average density of 23.6 per square mile (9.1/km^{2}). The racial makeup of the town was 98.46% White, 0.10% Native American, 0.58% Asian, 0.19% from other races, and 0.67% from two or more races. Hispanic or Latino of any race were 0.38% of the population.

There were 417 households, out of which 32.9% had children under the age of 18 living with them, 61.9% were married couples living together, 6.2% had a female householder with no husband present, and 28.8% were non-families. 21.1% of all households were made up of individuals, and 6.2% had someone living alone who was 65 years of age or older. The average household size was 2.49 and the average family size was 2.92.

In the town, the population was spread out, with 24.4% under the age of 18, 4.9% from 18 to 24, 29.8% from 25 to 44, 29.8% from 45 to 64, and 11.1% who were 65 years of age or older. The median age was 40 years. For every 100 females, there were 101.2 males. For every 100 females age 18 and over, there were 99.0 males.

The median income for a household in the town was $40,000, and the median income for a family was $46,500. Males had a median income of $37,321 versus $23,750 for females. The per capita income for the town was $17,903. About 5.4% of families and 9.4% of the population were below the poverty line, including 14.3% of those under age 18 and 8.1% of those age 65 or over.

== Education ==
Fayette Central School is located in Fayette. Michael Cormier is the Superintendent of Schools. Fayette Central School received an A in Governor Lepage's Maine DOE Report Cards in 2014. Children who live in Fayette attend Fayette Central School through grade 5 and are sent to either Spruce Mountain, Winthrop, or Maranacook school districts on tuition for secondary education.

== Portland street name ==
Fayette Street, a cul-de-sac off Veranda Street in Portland, Maine, is named for the town.
