= Bồ Đề River =

River in Vietnam

The Bồ Đề River (Vietnamese: Sông Bồ Đề) is a river of Cà Mau province, Vietnam. It flows for 10 kilometres.
