= USCGC Acushnet =

The following ships of the United States Coast Guard have borne the name USCGC Acushnet;

- USCGC Acushnet (1908), a former Revenue Cutter, in service from 1915 to 1917 and again from 1919 to 1936
- USCGC Acushnet (WMEC-167), formerly USS Shackle of the United States Navy, the ship was in service from 1946 to 2011
