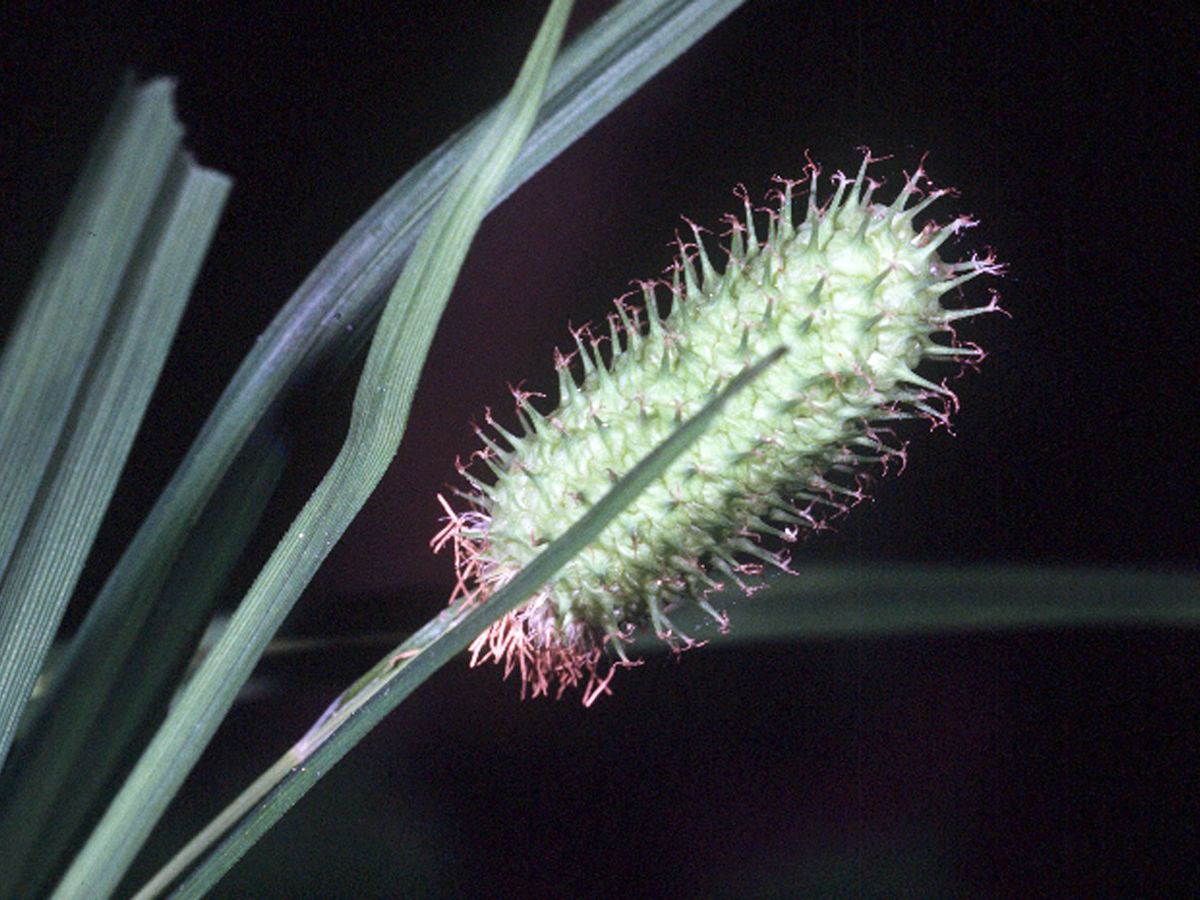
- Carex typhina

Scientific classification
- Kingdom: Plantae
- Clade: Tracheophytes
- Clade: Angiosperms
- Clade: Monocots
- Clade: Commelinids
- Order: Poales
- Family: Cyperaceae
- Genus: Carex
- Species: C. typhina

Binomial name
- Carex typhina Michx.

= Carex typhina =

Species of grass-like plant

Carex typhina, often called the cattail sedge, is a rare species of Carex known to grow in wetlands. It is native to North America.

== Conservation status ==
It is listed as a special concern species in Connecticut, possibly extirpated in Maine, threatened in Massachusetts, Michigan, and New York (state), and endangered in Pennsylvania.

== Physical description ==
Carex Typhina can grow to heights of 30 to 80 centimeters with a reddish-brown hue at the base of the stem. Their heads feature multiple erect spikes
