= Wayne, Maine =

Town in Maine, United States

- Town
- Seal

- Location in Kennebec County and the state of Maine
- Coordinates: 44°21′45″N 70°05′25″W
- Country: United States
- State: Maine
- County: Kennebec
- Villages: Wayne; North Wayne

Area
  - Total: 25.63 sq mi (66.38 km^{2})
  - Land: 19.26 sq mi (49.88 km^{2})
  - Water: 6.37 sq mi (16.50 km^{2})
- Elevation: 285 ft (87 m)

Population (2020)
  - Total: 1,129
  - Density: 59/sq mi (22.6/km^{2})
- Time zone: UTC-5 (Eastern (EST))
  - Summer (DST): UTC-4 (EDT)
- ZIP Codes: 04284 (Wayne); 04265 (North Monmouth)
- Area code: 207
- FIPS code: 23-80880
- GNIS feature ID: 582796
- Website: www.waynemaine.org

Wayne is a town in Kennebec County, Maine, United States. Wayne is included in the Lewiston-Auburn, Maine metropolitan New England city and town area. The population was 1,129 at the 2020 census. The town was named after Revolutionary War General Anthony Wayne. During the summer, Wayne is home to Camp Androscoggin. A popular recreation spot in central Maine, Wayne is part of the Winthrop Lakes Region. The town is included in the Augusta, Maine micropolitan New England City and Town Area. and included in the Lewiston-Auburn, Maine metropolitan New England city and town area.

== Geography ==
According to the United States Census Bureau, the town has a total area of 25.63 square miles (66.38 km^{2}), of which 19.26 square miles (49.88 km^{2}) is land and 6.37 square miles (16.50 km^{2}) is water. The Androscoggin Yacht Club is located in Wayne on Androscoggin Lake, at the foot of the road over Morrison Heights.

== Demographics ==
Historical population
Census	Pop.	Note	%±
1800	500		—
1810	819		63.8%
1820	1,051		28.3%
1830	1,153		9.7%
1840	1,201		4.2%
1850	1,367		13.8%
1860	1,194		−12.7%
1870	938		−21.4%
1880	950		1.3%
1890	775		−18.4%
1900	707		−8.8%
1910	595		−15.8%
1920	458		−23.0%
1930	464		1.3%
1940	463		−0.2%
1950	459		−0.9%
1960	498		8.5%
1970	577		15.9%
1980	680		17.9%
1990	1,029		51.3%
2000	1,112		8.1%
2010	1,189		6.9%
2020	1,129		−5.0%
U.S. Decennial Census

=== 2010 census ===
As of the census of 2010, there were 1,189 people, 514 households, and 358 families living in the town. The population density was 61.7 inhabitants per square mile (23.8/km^{2}). There were 848 housing units at an average density of 44.0 per square mile (17.0/km^{2}). The racial makeup of the town was 98.9% White, 0.2% Asian, 0.7% from other races, and 0.3% from two or more races. Hispanic or Latino of any race were 0.8% of the population.

There were 514 households, of which 24.9% had children under the age of 18 living with them, 58.9% were married couples living together, 6.8% had a female householder with no husband present, 3.9% had a male householder with no wife present, and 30.4% were non-families. 24.1% of all households were made up of individuals, and 9.9% had someone living alone who was 65 years of age or older. The average household size was 2.31 and the average family size was 2.68.

The median age in the town was 49.1 years. 19.3% of residents were under the age of 18; 5.3% were between the ages of 18 and 24; 18.1% were from 25 to 44; 40.6% were from 45 to 64; and 16.7% were 65 years of age or older. The gender makeup of the town was 50.5% male and 49.5% female.

=== 2000 census ===
As of the census of 2000, there were 1,112 people, 467 households, and 330 families living in the town. The population density was 57.8 inhabitants per square mile (22.3/km^{2}). There were 753 housing units at an average density of 39.2 per square mile (15.1/km^{2}). The racial makeup of the town was 98.56% White, 0.27% African American, 0.09% Asian, and 1.08% from two or more races. Hispanic or Latino of any race were 0.18% of the population.

There were 465 households, out of which 30.5% had children under the age of 18 living with them, 60.2% were married couples living together, 6.0% had a female householder with no husband present, and 29.0% were non-families. 22.8% of all households were made up of individuals, and 9.9% had someone living alone who was 65 years of age or older. The average household size was 2.39 and the average family size was 2.80.

In the town, the population was spread out, with 23.5% under the age of 18, 4.5% from 18 to 24, 24.9% from 25 to 44, 30.6% from 45 to 64, and 16.5% who were 65 years of age or older. The median age was 44 years. For every 100 females, there were 104.0 males. For every 100 females age 18 and over, there were 93.8 males.

The median income for a household in the town was $45,625, and the median income for a family was $54,632. Males had a median income of $40,625 versus $29,659 for females. The per capita income for the town was $26,015. About 3.9% of families and 5.9% of the population were below the poverty line, including 4.7% of those under age 18 and 8.3% of those age 65 or over.

== Notable people ==
- T. Brigham Bishop (1835–1905), American composer of popular music
- John Emory Bryant, Union Army Civil War veteran, Freedman Bureau official in Georgia
- Annie Louise Cary (1842–1921), popular American singer
- Robert B. Charles, American lawyer and military officer
- Allen P. Lovejoy, Wisconsin politician

== See also ==
- Wing Family Cemetery
- Camp Androscoggin
