= Camp Androscoggin =

Summer camp in Wayne, Maine

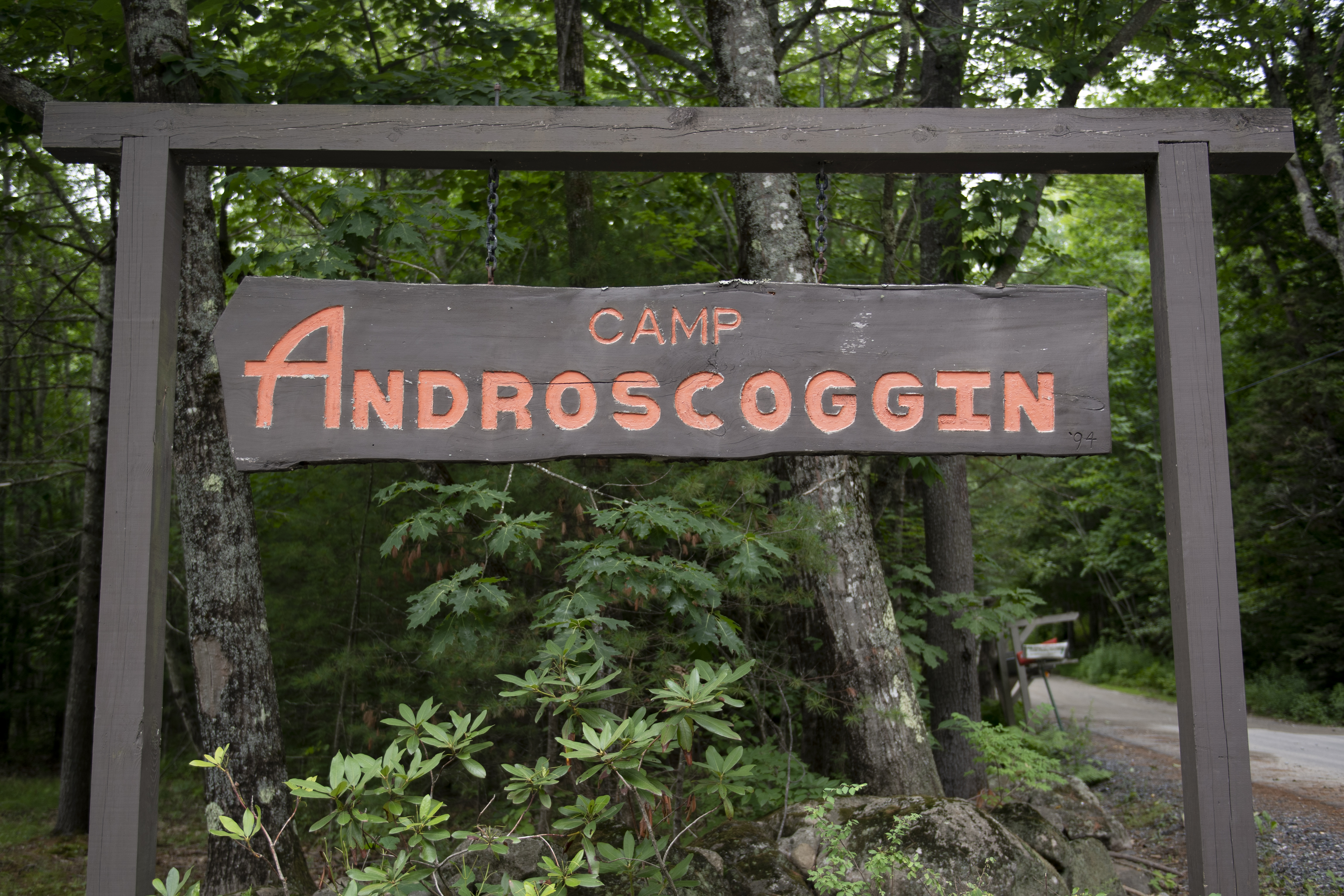

- Seal
- Nickname: Camp Andro
- Motto: Help the Other Fellow
- Location within the state of Maine
- Coordinates: 44°20′58″N 70°3′25″W
- Country: United States
- State: Maine
- County: Kennebec
- Founded: 1907
- Elevation: 299 ft (91 m)

Population
  - Total: About 275 campers
- Time zone: UTC-5 (Eastern (EST))
  - Summer (DST): UTC-4 (EDT)
- ZIP code: 04284
- Area code: 207
- FIPS code: 23-80880
- GNIS feature ID: 0582796

Camp Androscoggin is an all-boys summer camp in Wayne, Maine, and one of the oldest in the state. It is ACA (American Camp Association) accredited. It was founded in 1907 by Edward M. Healy, a Department Head at the Pratt Institute in Brooklyn, New York. Healy became President of the American Camping Association (ACA) in 1916 shortly before his death.

The camp has an average intake of between 250 and 280 boys aged 8 to 15 years, and takes enrollments nationally and internationally.

== History ==
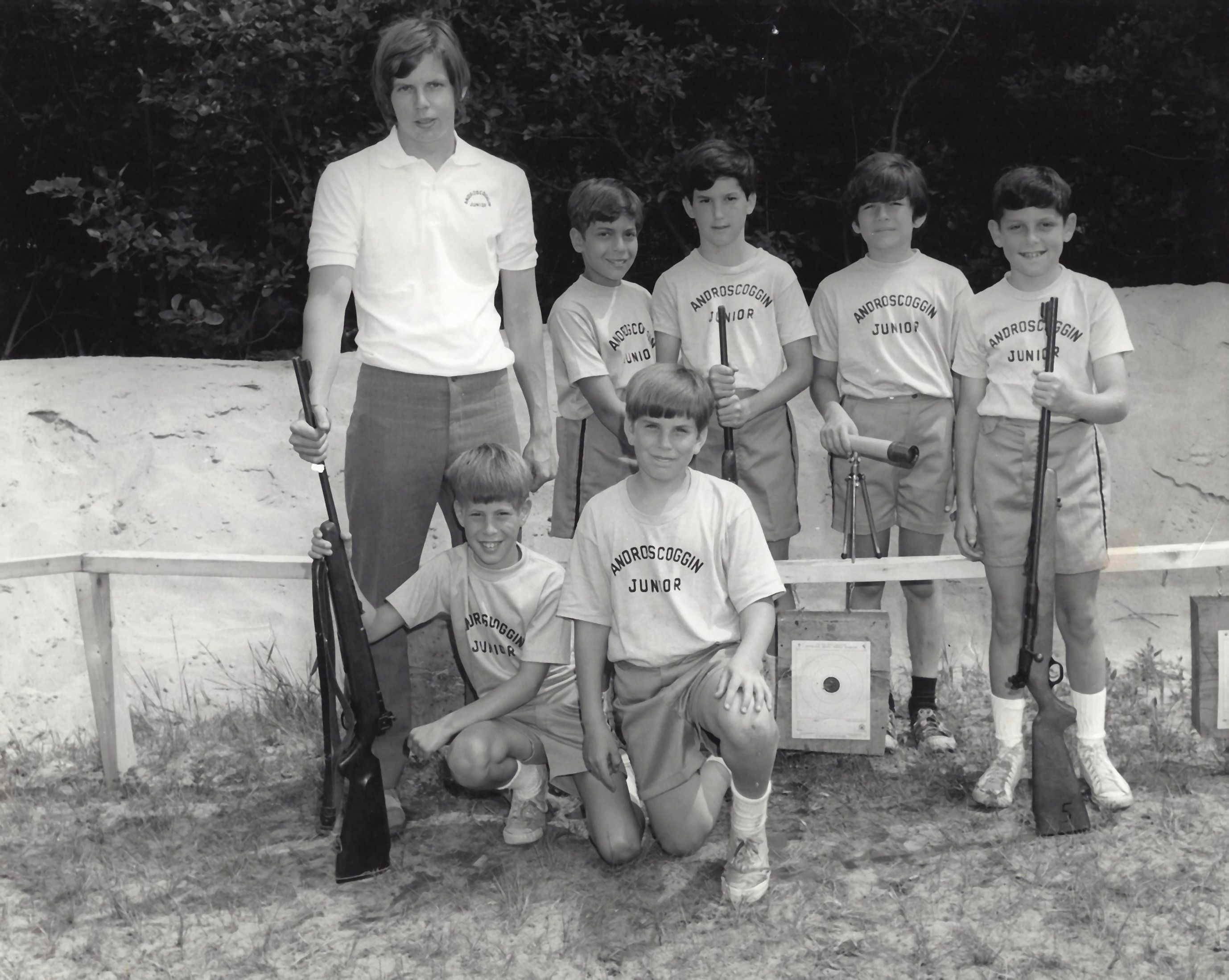
Camp Androscoggin riflery program in 1971

Camp Androscoggin was established in 1907 on Sans Souci Island, renamed "Androscoggin Island" over a century ago, in Lake Androscoggin. During the camp's inaugural summer, only 7 campers were enrolled. In 1937, a new "Junior Camp" was added on the lake's shore, which was initially for campers aged 8 to 11 years. The two camps briefly combined during World War II due to a fuel shortage, and combined permanently inland in 1972 after a fire. Androscoggin was the site of the third and fourth Seeds of Peace camps in 1995–96.

Camp Androscoggin has had many notable campers including Stephen Sondheim, Alan Jay Lerner, Tom Lehrer, William Zeckendorf, Curtis Schenker, Craig Effron, and Si Newhouse.

Jeffrey Lurie, owner of the Philadelphia Eagles and Robert Kraft, owner of the New England Patriots, both attended Camp Androscoggin, meaning that both team owners in Super Bowl XXXIX and Super Bowl LI are alumni, and, combined, Androscoggin alumni have won seven Super Bowls as NFL team owners.

== Activities ==
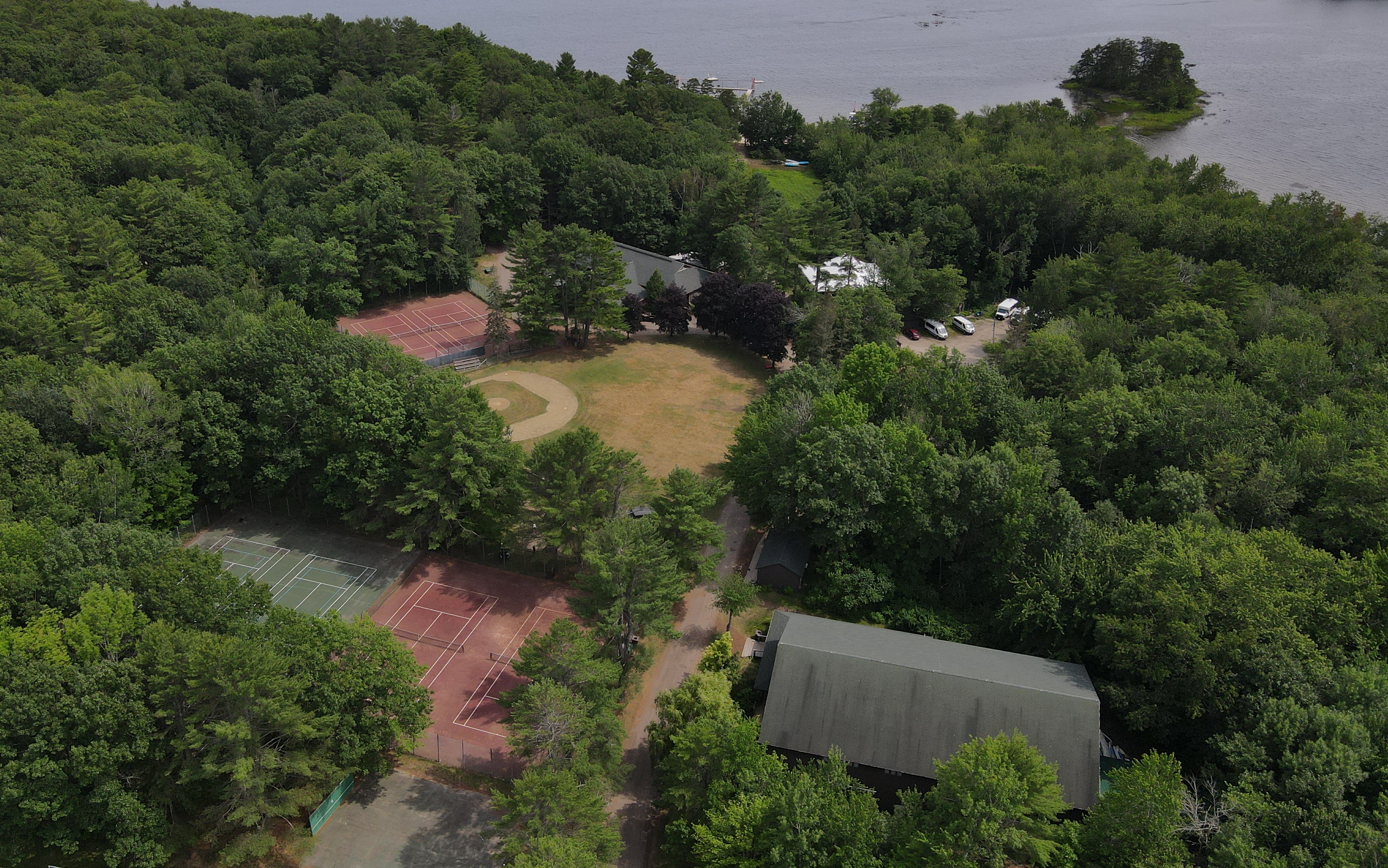
An aerial view of Camp Androscoggin located on Lake Androscoggin taken in July 2021.

Camp Androscoggin is part of the Central Maine Camp League (CMCL), competing with Camps Cobbossee, Caribou, Manitou, and others camps in sports, including baseball, soccer, tennis, basketball, archery, and swimming.

Land sports take place on its two baseball fields, two soccer fields, three basketball courts, twelve tennis courts, archery and rifles ranges, and a climbing wall. A recent addition to sport facilities is the Foster Fieldhouse, with a high school regulation-sized basketball court.

Water sports use a 2,000-foot-long (610 m) shoreline for competitive and instructional swimming, sailing, fishing, canoeing, kayaking, windsurfing, waterskiing and wakeboarding.

Arts and crafts, pottery, woodworking, photography, video, and animation take place in an arts center and a media center, and a theater holds musical talent shows and plays, and the final event of the camp's four-week long Color War, during which campers sing Alma Mater and fight songs.

Twenty network ID's for Nickelodeon have been produced here in 1988, along with "Toon Break", a series of shorts for Toon Disney.

Androscoggin also has an overnight and day-trip program, including trips to Mt. Washington, Mount Katahdin, the Allagash River, the Kennebec River, and Montreal.

The camp colors are black and orange.

== Notable alumni ==
- Robert Kraft
- Jeffrey Lurie
- Tom Lehrer
- Stephen Sondheim
- Alan Jay Lerner
- William Zeckendorf
- Si Newhouse
