= Androscoggin Lake =

Body of water in Maine, U.S.

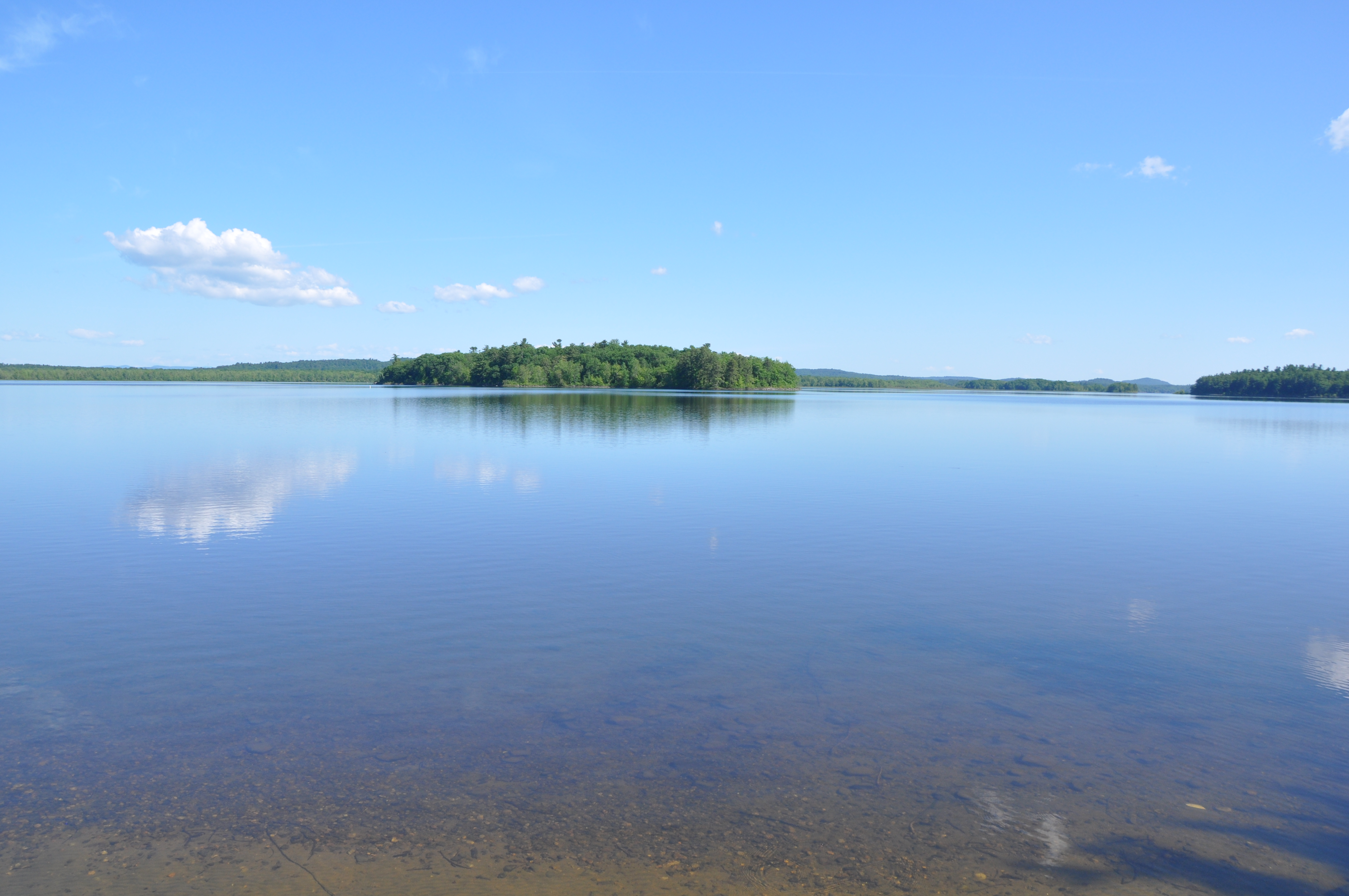

- Location within Maine
- Location: Androscoggin and Kennebec County, Maine
- Coordinates: 44°19′27″N 70°05′04″W
- Basin countries: United States
- Max. length: 4.5 mi (7.2 km)
- Max. width: 2.8 mi (4.5 km)
- Surface area: 3,826 acres (1,548 ha)
- Average depth: 15 ft (4.6 m)
- Max. depth: 38 ft (12 m)
- Water volume: 23,892 acre⋅ft (29,470,000 m^{3})
- Surface elevation: 269 ft (82 m)
- Islands: Androscoggin Island, Blodgett Island, Lothrop Island, Norris Island
- Settlements: Wayne and Leeds, Maine

Androscoggin Lake is a body of water located in the towns of Wayne and Leeds, Maine. The surface area of the lake is 3,826 acres (1,548 ha). Its greatest length is 4.5 mi (7.2 km) and its greatest width is 2.8 mi (4.5 km). The lake is very shallow with a mean depth of 15 ft (4.6 m) and maximum depth of 38 ft (12 m). The lake temperature is therefore quite warm during summer, and the temperature is the same on the bottom as it is on the top, making it a homothermous body of water. There are 4 islands on the lake: Androscoggin Island, Blodgett Island, Lothrop Island and Norris Island. Norris Island has a cabin that can be reserved for free on tklt.org. The islands support a diverse assemblage of rare species and natural communities. The most extensive areas are along and around the Dead River, which connects the lake to the Androscoggin River. The islands also provide important nesting habitat for bald eagles, ospreys and great blue herons. Lothrop Island's black sand beaches are of geological interest and are also home to several rare plants.

== Development ==
Androscoggin is relatively undeveloped. The towns of Wayne and Leeds have populations of less than 2,500 people each. There is a public boat landing located off of Rt. 133 in Wayne. This is the only public access to the lake. The northern and eastern shores are part of the Winthrop Lakes Region. Androscoggin is the main water source for Camp Androscoggin, a boys' summer camp located on the lake shore and formerly located on Androscoggin Island. Another summer camp, Camp Tekakwitha, is located at the southern tip of the lake in Leeds. The lake's purity is sustained by the Androscoggin Lake Dam located at the end of the Dead River in Leeds. The dam was built in 1940 to keep out water contaminated by waste from the surrounding towns.

== Fishing and wildlife ==
Many different species of fish inhabit Androscoggin Lake. The most common species are large-mouth bass, small mouth bass, chain pickerel and brown trout. Other fish less commonly found in the lake include yellow and white perch, redbreast sunfish, pumpkinseed sunfish, and the american eel. Fishing is permitted year-round with the proper permit.

The cattail sedge is a plant found on Androscoggin Lake. The lake is the only place in Maine where this rare and endangered plant has been found. The exact location where the plant was discovered is unknown.
