= Al Başrah Oil Terminal =

Iraqi oil terminal

Coordinates: 29°47′00″N 48°48′25″E

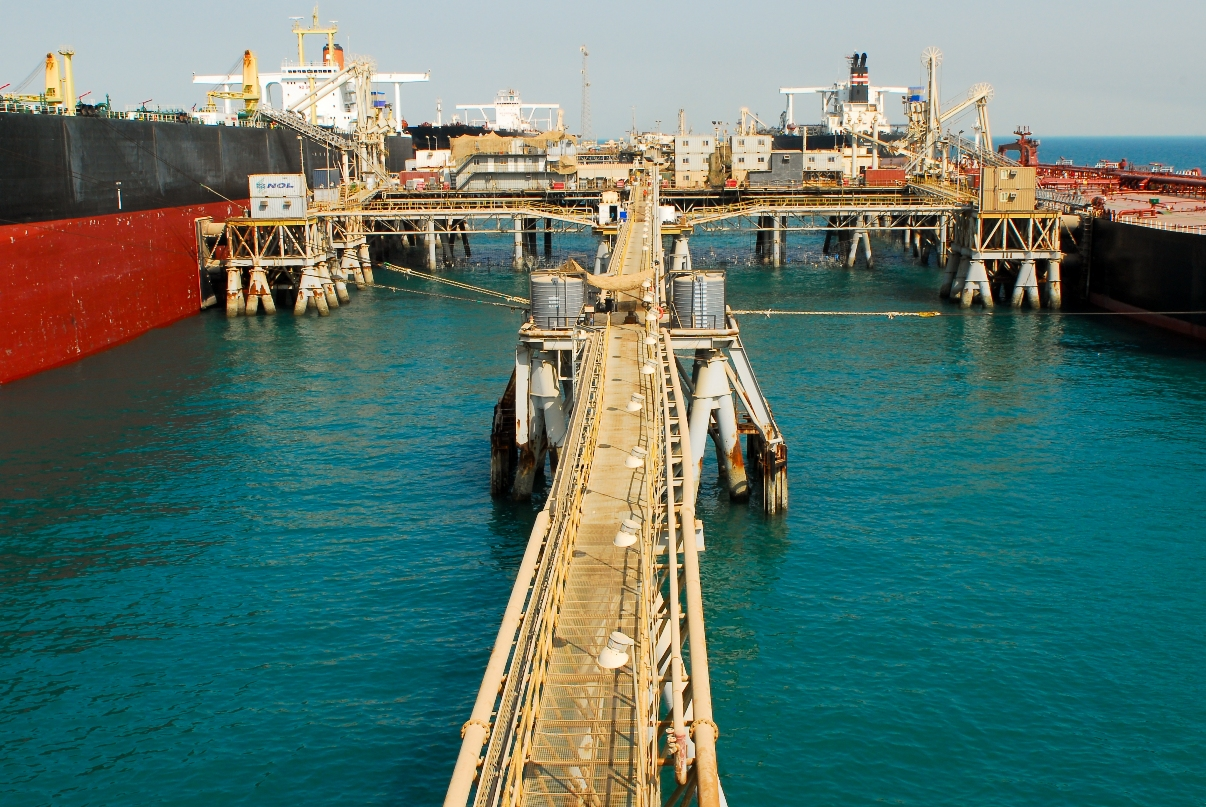
Three supertankers filling at ABOT. The leftmost ship has just started filling; when full, the red portion of the hull will be below the waterline like the ship on the right.

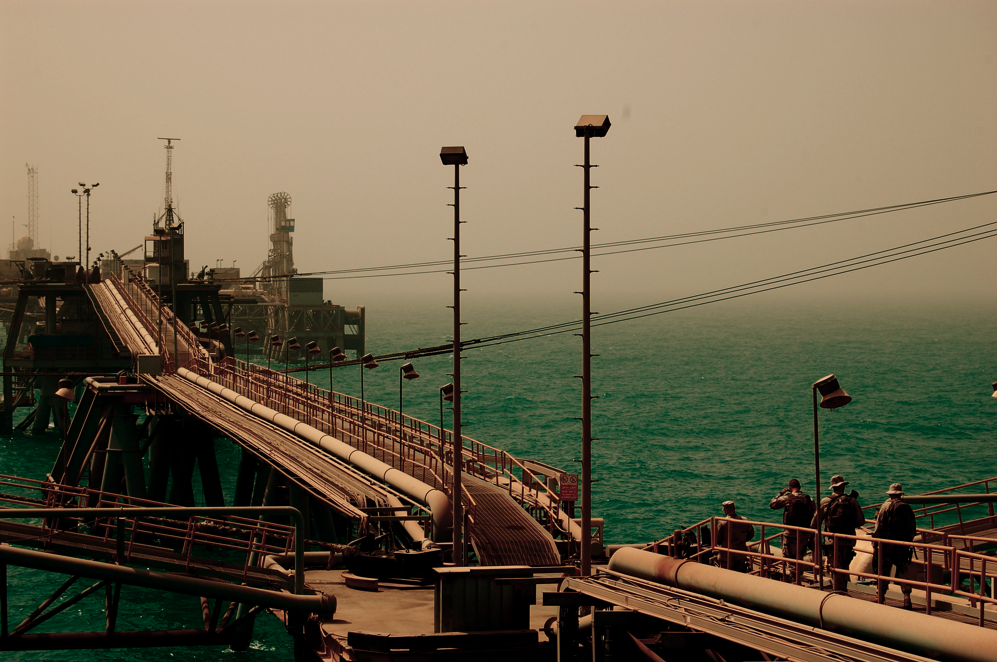
MESD 823 personnel onboard ABOT, 2009

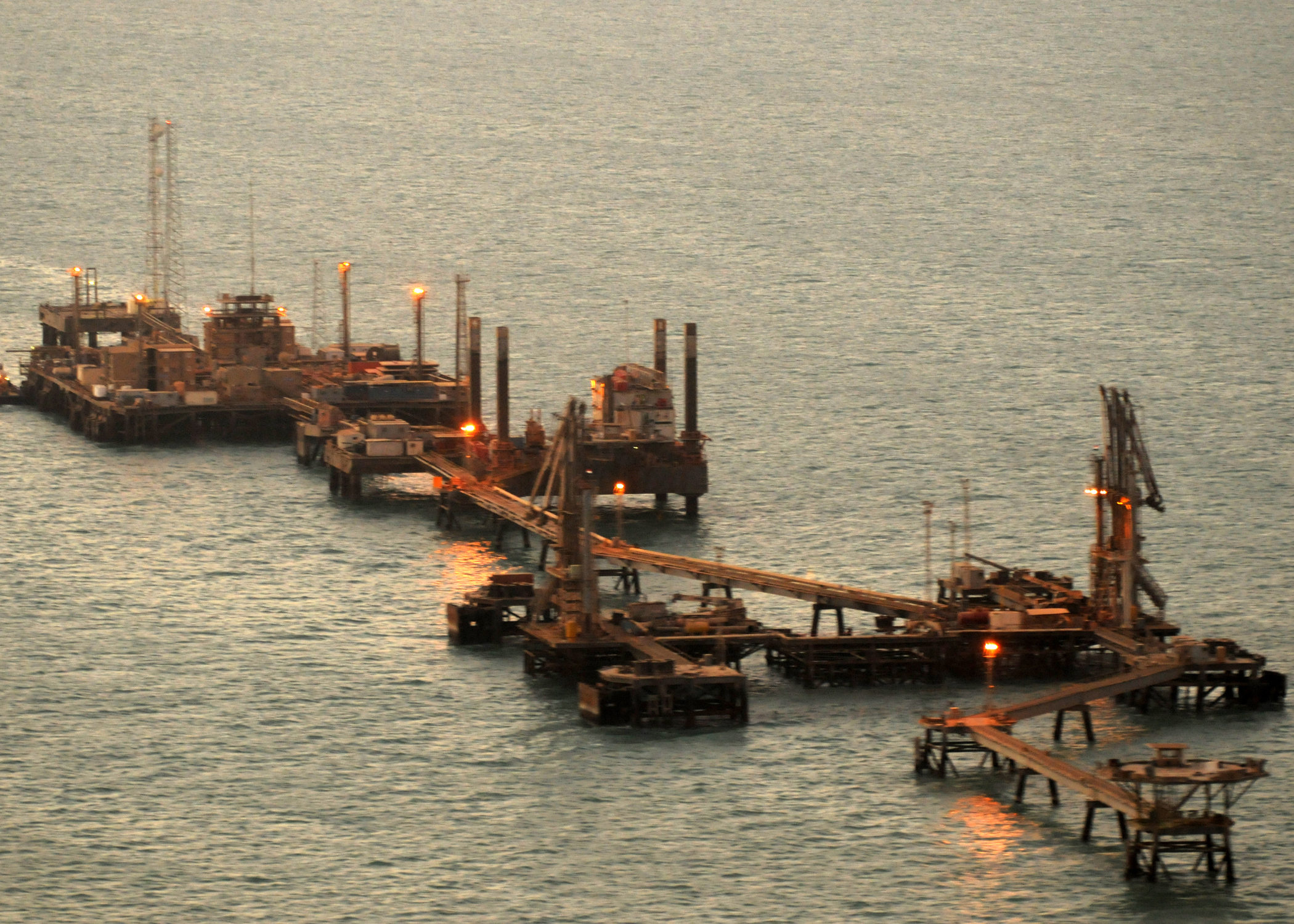
An aerial view of KAAOT just after sunrise

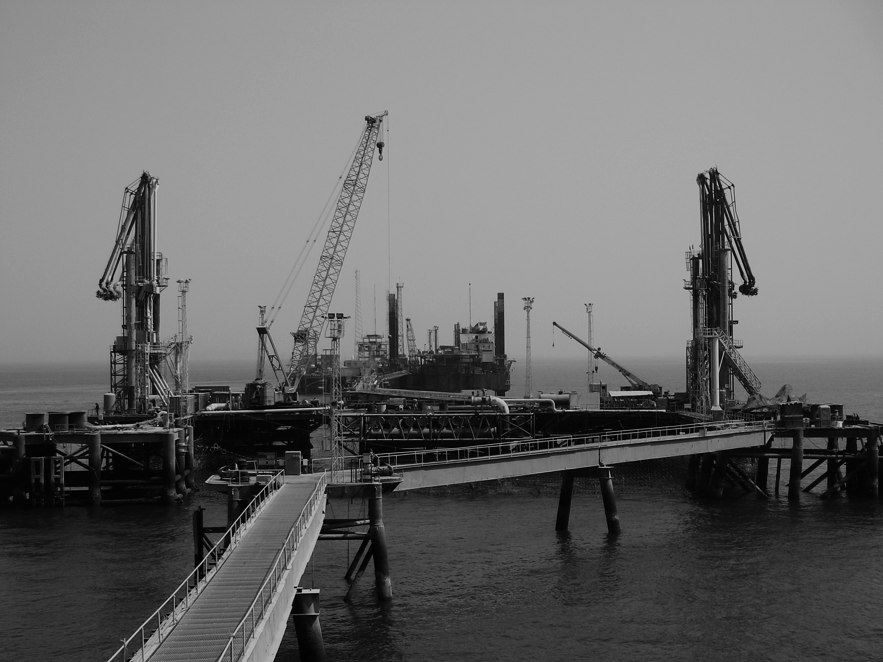
Iraqi sailors and marines guard KAAOT in its entirety with minimal support.

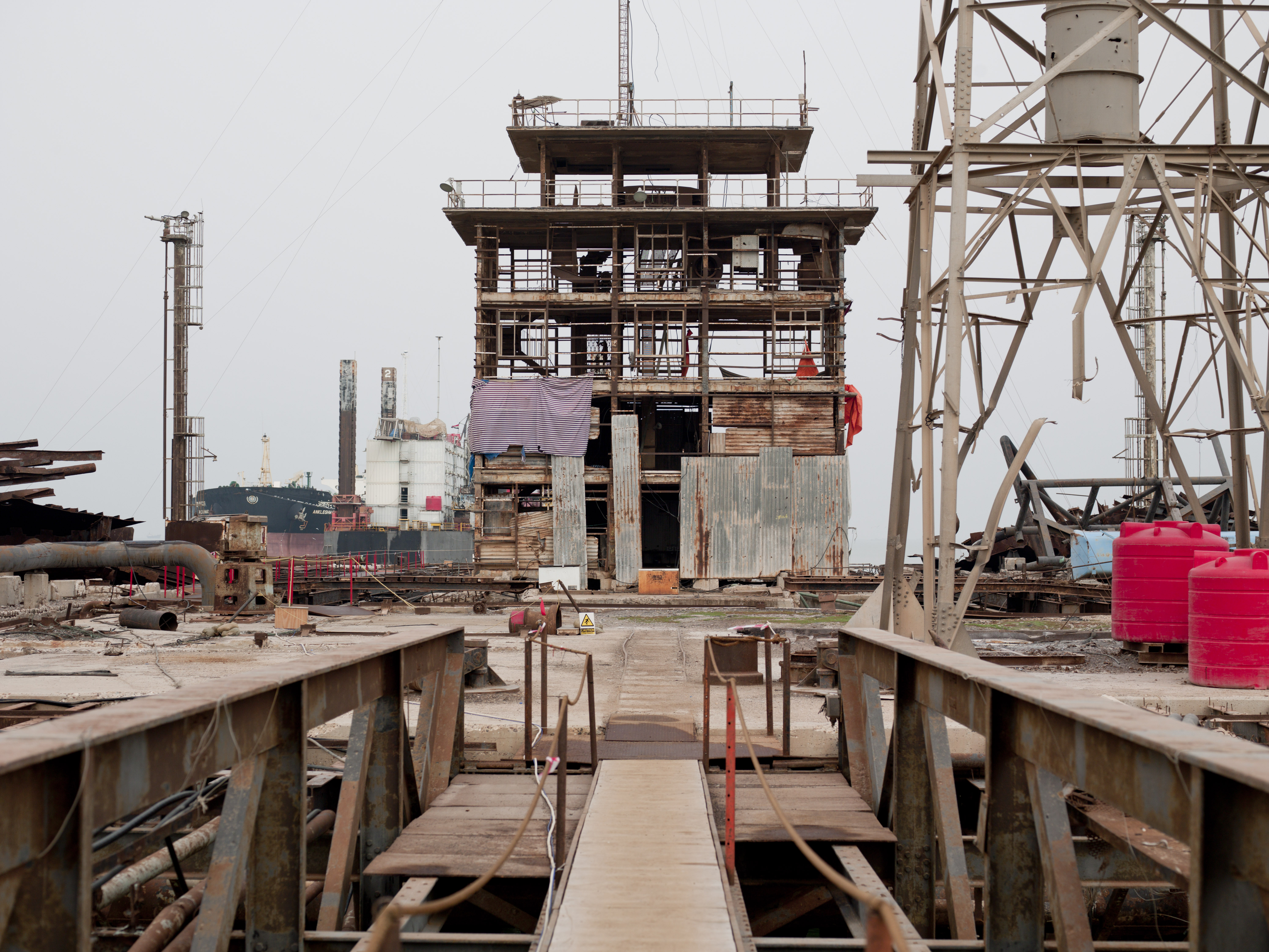
KAAOT from ground level in Feb, 2007.

Al Başrah Oil Terminal, commonly referred to as ABOT, is a strategically critical Iraqi offshore, deep sea crude oil marine loading terminal that lies approximately 50 km (31 mi) southeast of the Al-Faw Peninsula in the Persian Gulf. Along with its sister terminal, the Khawr al ‘Amīyah Oil Terminal (ميناء خور العمية, alt. Khor al-Amaya Oil Terminal, KAAOT), the terminals provide the principal point of export for more than eighty percent of Iraq's gross domestic product as of 2009, and all of the oil from the southern Başrah refinery.

Crude oil produced for export from the southern Iraqi oilfields is carried through three 48 in (1.2 m) diameter pipelines to the southern tip of the al-Faw Peninsula and then undersea to the ABOT^{()} platform. One 48 in (1.2 m) and two 32 in (0.81 m) pipelines supply the KAAOT^{()} platform.

The ABOT facilities can transfer up to 3 million barrels (480,000 m^{3}) (Mbbl) of oil per day when all four of its supertanker berths operate at maximum capacity and has a maximum draft of 21 m (69 ft). Three single-point mooring systems (SPM) were added in 2012, each with a design rating of 800 thousand barrels (130,000 m^{3}) (kbbl) of oil per day, and two more SPMs are planned to be operational by 2013 to increase total loading capacity to 6.4–6.6 Mbbl (1,020,000–1,050,000 m^{3}) of oil per day.

The KAAOT facility has a shallower depth and its two berths can accommodate Suezmax oil tankers with capacities up to 1 Mbbl (160,000 m^{3}) or 200,000 DWT and has the capacity to transfer about 240 kbbl (38,000 m^{3}) of oil daily.

== History ==
ABOT was originally named Mīnā' al-Bakr Oil Terminal and was designed and commissioned into service by Brown & Root in 1974 with a design lifetime, with proper maintenance, of 20 years. In 2003, the current name ABOT was adopted. The facility was constructed with four berths capable of handling very large crude carrier type vessels (VLCC) and offloading 300–400 kbbl (48,000–64,000 m^{3}) per day through each of the berths. The ABOT suffered significant damage during the 1980-1988 Iran-Iraq War; however, it remained in service until 1989, when Brown & Root attempted to refurbish it after the conclusion of that war. Work was stopped when Iraq invaded Kuwait in 1990 and the facility was inflicted with further damage during the ensuing Gulf War. In addition, the platform was operated under the Oil-for-Food Programme for several years thereafter with minimal maintenance.

The Mīnā' Khawr al ‘Amīyah Oil Terminal (KAAOT) was built in 1958 and had fallen into extreme disrepair and would require wholesale reconstruction to restore full capabilities as of 2007. The shallow draft of its location, however, makes a reconstruction effort of questionable economic value.

=== Operation Iraqi Freedom ===
After the terminal was secured by SOCOM forces, defense of the platform throughout OIF was provided by USMC, USN, and USCG forces in conjunction with the Iraqi military.

The United States Navy's Maritime Expeditionary Security Force, which falls under the Naval Expeditionary Combat Command, was responsible for the primary defense of the platforms, as well as the training and deployment of Iraqi Marines on board.

While under US control, the US units enforcing the 3 km (1.9 mi; 1.6 nmi) warning and 2 km (1.2 mi; 1.1 nmi) exclusion zones around ABOT and KAAOT including Maritime interdiction operations were conducted primarily by Patrol Forces Southwest Asia a component of the United States Coast Guard comprising Island class cutters and United States Navy Patrol craft coastal. United States Coast Guard Port Security Units were assigned to assist the Task Force with the security of these facilities for Coalition partners.

=== Refurbishment Under Coalition Forces ===
In 2004, the ABOT platform was refurbished and upgraded under contract W9126G-04-D-0002, an indefinite delivery, indefinite quantity (IDIQ), cost-plus award fee with an estimated not-to-exceed value of US$800 million. The contract was between the United States Army Corps of Engineers (USACE) of Fort Worth and Parsons Iraqi Joint Venture (PIJV), Houston. ABOT's capacity was more than doubled to offload up to 3 Mbbl (480,000 m^{3}) of oil per day. Practical constraints in the upstream refinery and oil fields limit actual delivery below the designed maximum.

Despite the work conducted, the dilapidated and fragile nature of the terminal was featured in an NPR story on June 20, 2009, and again on October 4, 2010. Engineers interviewed said that "they didn't even know just how bad the condition of the pipeline is; they didn't dare run it at full pressure for fear it would burst, and they didn't dare shut down the flow to fix it for fear that the weight of the ocean would implode it"; the most recent capacity tests were conducted nearly two decades earlier in 1991.

=== Iraq Ministry of Oil Master Plan 2007 ===
The Iraqi Ministry of Oil (MoO) Master Plan 2007 included the Iraq Crude Oil Export Expansion Project (ICOEEP) to expand the South Oil Company's export capacity from 1.75 Mbbl (278,000 m^{3}) of oil per day (MMBOPD) to 4.5 Mbbl (720,000 m^{3}) of oil per day by 2014.

==== Iraq Crude Oil Export Expansion Project (ICOEEP), Phase 1 ====
On July 13, 2010 Foster Wheeler was awarded the front-end engineering & management contract for Phase 1 of the ICOEEP, Leighton Offshore was then awarded a US$733 million EPC contract with work commencing in November, 2010 for delivery in March, 2012 for a scope of work to include:

- Installation of two parallel, 48 in (1.2 m) outside diameter pipelines running 10 km (6.2 mi) onshore, through an onshore crossing, and then 40 km (25 mi) offshore to link with new single point mooring systems (SPM)
- A third onshore crossing for future expansion
- Installation of three SPMs with nameplate ratings of 900 kbbl (140,000 m^{3}) per day along with manifolds and subsea pipelines capable of servicing VLCCs - two operational and one spare
- Fabrication and installation of a 600 metric tons (660 short tons) subsea valve manifold
- Dredging to bury the pipelines and to provide adequate depth for VLCCs
- Construction of onshore metering and manifold facilities at the FAO storage facility

The "first oil ready for start-up" milestone was celebrated on February 12, 2012, with Iraq Prime Minister Nuri al-Maliki in attendance. The milestone marked the addition of 800 kbbl (130,000 m^{3}) barrels per day of export capacity via 130 km (81 mi) of onshore pipelines from the Al-Zubair pumping station to the FAO storage facility where eight new crude oil storage tanks, each with a capacity of 350 kbbl (56,000 m^{3}), were brought online with another eight tanks close to operational; these 16 storage tanks represent 25% of the 64 tanks planned for in the ICOEEP. The crude oil then flows offshore through the new twin 48" pipelines to the new 600 MT subsea valve manifold for distribution to two single point mooring systems. Phase 1 completion will increase overall exports by 1.8 MMBOPD when both SPMs and all sixteen storage tanks are operational. In November, 2012 Leighton Offshore transferred operations of the completed ICOEEP installations. On March 7, 2012, the first tanker was berthed and loaded from one of the 900,000 bpd SPMs installed during Phase 1 of the ICOEEP.

==== Iraq Crude Oil Export Expansion Project (ICOEEP), Phase 2 ====
The second phase of the ICOEEP added a central metering and management platform (CMMP), brought three SPMs online, and installed a fourth SPM. The scope of work included:

- Central Metering and Manifold Platform (CMMP)
- A 3.5 km (2.2 mi), 48 in (1.2 m) diameter pipeline near-shore
- One additional single-point mooring system
- Conversion of an existing spare SPM buoy to operational status
- Replacement of the spare SPM buoy
- Installation of a pig launcher

The EPC contract for Phase 2's Central Metering and Manifold Platform (CMMP) was awarded to Italy's Saipem in October, 2011 with delivery expected in the fourth quarter of 2013; other Phase 2 facilities include connecting the ABOT platform to the new pipelines via the CMMP.

==== Iraq Crude Oil Export Facility Reconstruction Project (COEFRP), aka JICA Sealine Project ====
The Iraq Crude Oil Export Facility Reconstruction Project (COEFRP) was funded by the Japan International Cooperation Agency and includes work to add a third 48 in (1.2 m) diameter pipeline running from shore to the ABOT valve station. New pipelines will also be run from the ABOT valve station to the KAAOT valve station to supply a fifth SPM and the KAAOT loading facilities. In October, 2011, the South Oil Company awarded two contracts worth US$518 million and US$79.85 million to Leighton Offshore for delivery in January, 2013 with a scope of work running in parallel with Phase 1 that includes:

- A third 75 km (47 mi), 48 in (1.2 m) diameter pipeline connecting onshore facilities to the offshore valve stations
- Two offshore valve station platforms, one at ABOT and a second at KAAOT
- One additional single-point mooring system

== Strategic role ==
ABOT and KAAOT are major players in Iraq's eventual economic stability and therefore are considered one of the top terrorist targets in the world due to their strategic importance.

On April 30, 2009, the Iraqi Navy assumed control of the Khawr al ‘Amīyah Oil Terminal and on July 26, 2011, they assumed control of ABOT as well.

== See also ==
- List of ports in Iraq
- Oil reserves in Iraq
- Petroleum industry in Iraq
