= USCGC Steelhead =

United States Coast Guard patrol boat

- Steelhead arriving in Fort Macon.

History

United States
- Name: Steelhead
- Namesake: Steelhead trout
- Operator: United States Coast Guard
- Builder: Bollinger Shipyards, Lockport, Louisiana
- Completed: 2000
- Commissioned: December 13, 2000
- Home port: Port Aransas, Texas (from 2000); Fort Macon, North Carolina (2021–)
- Identification: Hull number: WPB-87324
- Status: In active service
- Badge

General characteristics
- Class & type: Marine Protector-class patrol boat
- Length: 87 ft (27 m)

USCGC Steelhead (WPB-87324) is an 87-foot (27 m) Marine Protector-class of the United States Coast Guard. Built in 2000, it was first assigned to Port Aransas, Texas, on the Texas Gulf coast. In August 2021 it moved to Fort Macon, North Carolina, where it patrols from the mouth of Chesapeake Bay to the South Carolina border. Its missions include search and rescue, law enforcement, fisheries patrols and drug and migrant interdiction up to 200 miles (320 km) offshore.

== Design ==
Steelhead is one of the Marine Protector-class coastal patrol boats built for the Coast Guard by Bollinger Shipyards of Lockport, Louisiana, under a contract first awarded on March 13, 1996. The class replaced the older 82-foot Point-class cutters. It entered service in a special commissioning on September 5, 2000, and was officially commissioned on December 13, 2000.

== Service history ==
After it was built, Steelhead was assigned to Port Aransas, where its primary missions were law enforcement, search and rescue and homeland defense.

Steelhead arrived at its new homeport of Fort Macon, North Carolina, on August 6, 2021, joining the cutters Maple, Bayberry, Smilax, Richard Snyder and Nathan Bruckenthal. Captain Matt Baer, commander of Coast Guard Sector North Carolina, said the cutter would carry out law enforcement and search and rescue along the entire North Carolina coast.

== See also ==
- Marine Protector-class patrol boat
- List of United States Coast Guard cutters
