= USCGC Adak =

United States Coast Guard cutter

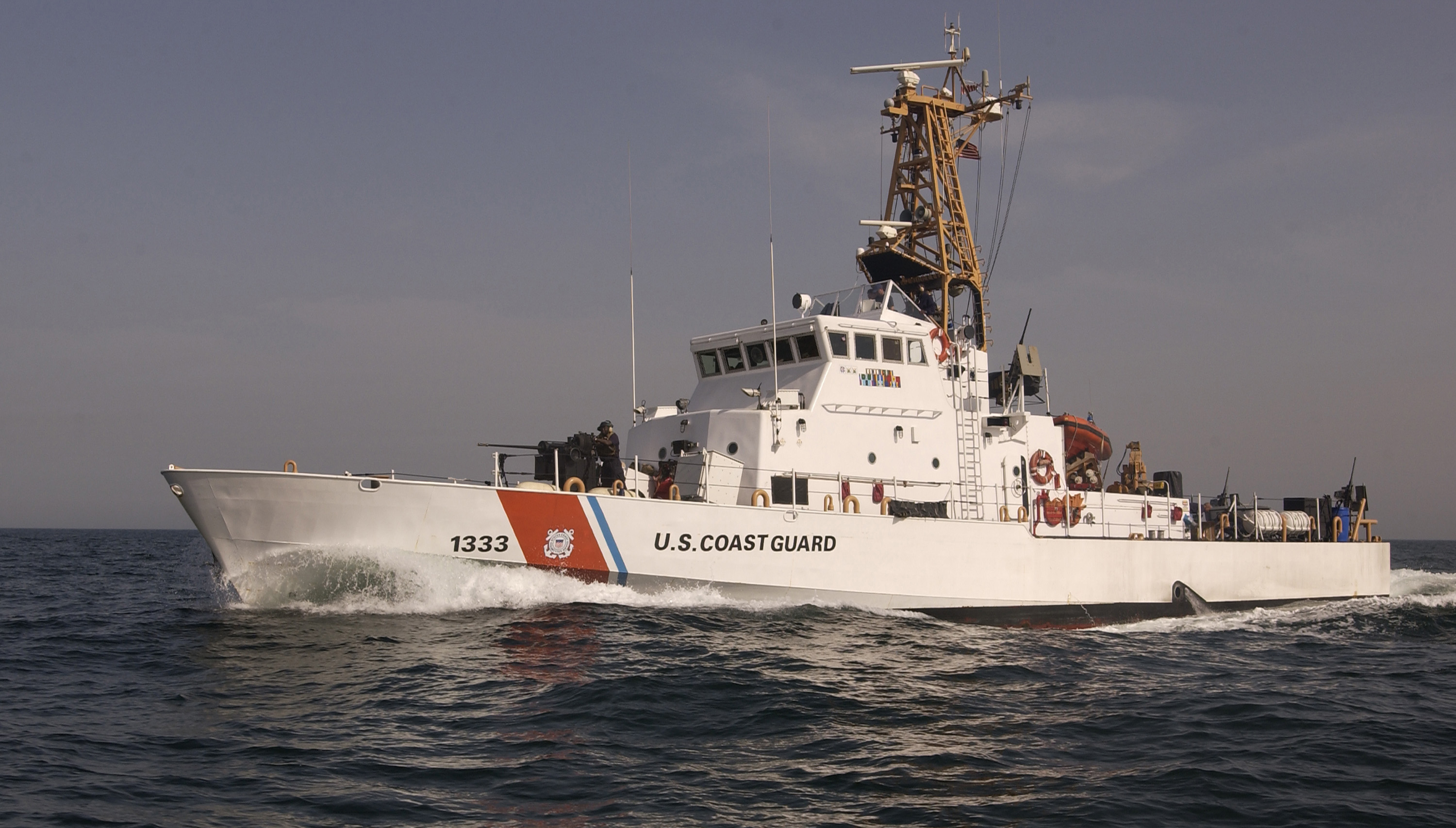
- Adak underway off the coast of Iraq in support of Operation Iraqi Freedom

History

United States
- Name: Adak
- Namesake: Adak Island, Alaska, US
- Builder: Bollinger Shipyard
- Cost: Approx. $7 Million
- Laid down: 16 October 1988
- Launched: 30 June 1989
- Sponsored by: Marlyn Thorsen
- Commissioned: 18 August 1989
- Decommissioned: 15 June 2021
- Home port: Manama, Bahrain
- Nickname(s): The Grizzly of the Gulf
- Fate: Transferred to Greece, 3 July 2023
- Status: In service with Greek Navy

General characteristics
- Class & type: Island-class patrol boat
- Displacement: 164 tons
- Length: 113 ft (34 m)
- Beam: 21 ft (6.4 m)
- Draft: 6.5 ft (2.0 m)
- Propulsion: Twin Paxman Valenta 16-CM RP-200M
- Speed: 30+ knots
- Range: 9,900 miles
- Endurance: 6 days
- Boats & landing craft carried: 1 – RHI (90 HP outboard engine)
- Complement: 22 personnel (3 officers, 19 enlisted)
- Armament: 25 mm Mk 38 machine gun; 5 × .50 caliber machine guns; 1 × MK 19 40MM Grenade Launcher Various Small Arms
- Notes: International radio call sign: NZRW Communications: VHF and HF

USCGC Adak (WPB-1333) was a United States Coast Guard cutter that received her name from Adak Island in the Aleutian Islands of Alaska. Built at Bollinger Shipyard in Lockport, Louisiana, Adak was placed in commission on 18 August 1989 in New Jersey and decommissioned on 30 June 2021 in Manama, Bahrain after almost 32 years of service.

== Service history ==
Her keel was laid on 16 October 1988 and she was launched on 30 June 1989.

Adak was originally stationed in Sandy Hook, New Jersey. Before Adak's commissioning ceremony in August 1989 in New Jersey, however, Adak had already completed six maritime rescues.

After stopping F/V Hunter off the coast of New York in 1991, Adak's boarding team found 10,771 lb (4,886 kg) of cocaine worth over $861 million at the time. This was the third largest cocaine bust up to that date.

On the evening of September 18, 1992, Adak rescued a missing diver off the coast of Shinnecock, Long Island. During her search for the missing diver from dive boat Captain Midnight, the crew saw a dim light, which upon investigation turned out to be the flashlight of the missing diver. The diver had been lost for five hours at that point.

In August 1994, Adak took part in Operation Able Vigil, an effort made up of over 50 U.S. Coast Guard cutters and Navy ships, and many other varied assets, making up the largest Coast Guard led naval operation since World War II. From August 19 to September 23, 1994, Operation Able Vigil forces rescued over 29,000 Cuban migrants from unsafe rafts and makeshift craft. For her part in the operation Adak earned the Coast Guard Unit Commendation.

In April 1996, while on patrol off Puerto Rico, Adak rescued 118 Dominican Republic migrants from two dangerously overloaded and unseaworthy boats.

Adak was witness to the crash of TWA Flight 800 off the coast of Long Island, New York, on July 17, 1996. The cutter was only 15 nmi (28 km; 17 mi) away when the crash occurred and immediately headed to the scene. Adak served as the On-Scene Commander for almost 100 rescue craft for the first eight hours of the search and recovery effort. For her actions responding to the TWA Flight 800 crash Adak received the Coast Guard Unit Commendation.

During Adak's stateside service she conducted many successful fisheries patrols, enforcing maritime laws and treaties, and ensuring the safety of fishermen. In August 1999, she received the Coast Guard Meritorious Unit Commendation for her work from June 1997 to June 1999, doing living marine resources patrols. During this time Adak issued eleven Magnuson Fishery Conservation Act violations, five of those resulting in catch seizures that, together, totalled over $160,000.

After the attacks on the World Trade Center towers on September 11, 2001, the Coast Guard tug Hawser, homeported in Bayonne, New Jersey, was the first on scene in New York Harbor and acted as On-Scene Commander. Adak arrived on scene an hour later and took over On-Scene Commander responsibilities. For hours Adak coordinated the evacuation of civilians, transport of firefighters and rescue personnel, and the establishment of security zones to protect other high valued assets from further attack. For her part in the response to the attacks of September 11, Adak received the Secretary of Transportation Outstanding Unit Award.

=== Operation Iraqi Freedom ===
The maritime conditions of Iraq and the Northern Persian Gulf can greatly limit the operations of large naval vessels and warships. Due to this and the Navy's lack of in-shore patrol craft, a large part of the US Navy's request for Coast Guard assistance in Operation Iraqi Freedom (OIF) centered on the service's shallow-draft patrol boats. Cutters of the 110-foot Island class, also known as WPBs, would serve as the mainstay of shallow-water operations. The deployment of the 110-foot patrol boat Adak serves as a snapshot of WPB operations in OIF. Deployment of the WPBs overseas would represent the first combat deployment of Coast Guard patrol boats since the Vietnam War, even though other Coast Guard assets had served in operations Desert Shield and Desert Storm in the 1990s.

In early February 2003, the Coast Guard's Atlantic Area Command deployed to the Persian Gulf the WPBs Adak, Aquidneck, Baranof, and Wrangell. The 110s arrived in Bahrain, at the beginning of March, having ridden on board MV Industrial Challenger for thirty-five days. On March 5, a heavy-lift crane off-loaded the WPBs taking only six hours to set all four in the water. Adak ran through sea trials for two days and on 9 March, Adak and sister ship Aquidneck deployed to the Persian Gulf followed by Baranof and Wrangell on March 12.

In the days leading up to combat operations, Adak focused on maritime interdiction operations. Coalition vessels had restricted passage of local watercraft out of the Khawr Abd Allah (KAA) Waterway, thinking that these vessels might carry mines or escaping Iraqi officials. By mid-March, local watercraft had attempted several breakouts with fleets of dhows and small boats and, on March 17, a large breakout consisting of sixty Iraqi watercraft attempted to evade Coalition units. With the vessels scattering in all directions, Adak, Wrangell, and their small boats, aided by other Coalition units, managed to corral all of the Iraqi watercraft and board them. None of the vessels carried escaping Iraqi leaders and all had discharged any illegal cargoes typical of small smuggling vessels. After boarding teams had thoroughly searched the dhows, Adak and the other patrol vessels allowed the watercraft to proceed along a specific route into the northern area of the Persian Gulf.

In the early morning hours of March 20, Coalition forces initiated combat operations with air attacks against key military targets in Baghdad. The Adak and Aquidneck enforced a security zone while the USS Higgins launched Tomahawk Land Attack Missiles into Iraq. In addition, Coalition forces had to secure Iraq's Khor al-Amaya Oil Terminal and Mina al Bakr Oil Terminal to prevent environmental attack by the Iraqi regime. On the evening of Marc 20th, SEAL teams supported by Polish Special Forces personnel, stormed the oil facilities. During the operation, Adak, along with Baranof, maintained security around the terminals to prevent reinforcement or escape by Iraqi military forces. After the SEALs cleared the terminals of Iraqi personnel, weapons and explosives, Coast Guard personnel from Port Security Units 311 and 313 arrived to secure the facilities.

Next Adak received orders to patrol the KAA Waterway, so by the early morning hours of March 21, Adak had steamed up the KAA to serve as a guard ship. In fact, of the 146 Coalition naval units in the Persian Gulf, Adak stationed itself deepest in enemy territory and served as the "tip of the spear" for Coalition naval forces. During its early morning patrol, Adak and navy patrol Chinook surprised and stopped two down-bound Iraqi tugboats, including one towing a barge, and ordered them to anchor. At first, the vessels raised no suspicions for they ordinarily serviced tankers and smaller watercraft that plied local waters. But the two patrol vessels continued guarding the tugs and a special boarding team composed of Australian and American explosives experts searched the tugs and barge and found concealed within them a total of seventy contact and acoustic mines. Had they been released, the mines could have sunk or heavily damaged Coalition naval vessels operating in the Persian Gulf. The team secured the tugs and Chinook transported the tug crews back to a Coalition naval vessel for processing. The captain of one of the mine-laying tugs admitted that the sight of the "white patrol boat" had prevented him from deploying his deadly cargo.

Throughout March 21, the captain and crew of Adak experienced a great deal of excitement. At 06:00, Australian and British frigates began naval fire support operations in what became known as "Five-Inch Friday". The warships poured nearly 200 rounds of four-and-a-half-inch (114 mm) and five-inch (127 mm) shells into the Iraqi defenses while Adak screened the vessels to ensure that no unauthorized watercraft approached. During this time, Mackenzie and his men felt buffeting from the explosions of hundreds of bombs and shells lobbed on shore. British Royal Marines, supported by US Navy and Royal Navy hovercraft, commenced the amphibious assault on the Al-Faw Peninsula; the largest amphibious operation carried out since the Korean War.

During the landings, an Iraqi PB-90 patrol boat had been cruising upstream on the KAA Waterway and positioned itself where it could threaten low-flying Coalition helicopters and provide early warning reports to land-based Iraqi forces on the Al Faw Peninsula. To engage the PB-90, the Coalition command center vectored in an AC-130 gunship, which destroyed the Iraqi vessel. Afterward, a Coalition helicopter spotted three surviving crewmembers floating down the KAA and notified Adak of their location. Adak conducted Combat Search and Rescue (CSAR) operations, recovered three hypothermic Iraqis at 8:30, and transferred the prisoners to an Australian naval vessel for processing. Coalition experts later identified the men as warrant officers from Iraq's Republican Guard.

After Coalition forces wrapped up the initial phase of combat operations, Coalition planners focused on opening the KAA Waterway to vessel traffic. Wrecks from the Iran–Iraq War and the First Gulf War still littered the KAA and its shores, but mines proved a greater concern. Some mines still remained in the waterway from Operation Desert Storm. Minesweeping operations began on March 22, with navy Sea Dragon helicopters towing minesweeping sleds along the waterway. Mackenzie received orders for Adak to join sister ship Wrangell, and navy patrol craft Chinook and Firebolt to escort US Navy and Royal Navy minesweepers up the KAA. The process proved slow as the minesweepers proceeded at a rate of three knots (5.6 km/h; 3.5 mph) up the forty-mile (64 km) channel to the Iraqi port of Umm Qasr. The patrol boats had to stand off 1,000 yd (914 m) from the minesweeping vessels and they often had to station themselves upriver from the minesweepers. On several occasions, the minesweepers located mines in waters previously navigated by the WPBs and, on one occasion, Adak's crew listened as the patrol boat contacted a mine that came to the surface and failed to detonate.

It took about a week to complete mine-clearing operations on the KAA and with Umm Qasr in Coalition hands, cargo vessels could begin steaming into the Iraqi port. Naval combat operations concluded near the end of March, but Adak joined the other WPBs to continue their force protection role and served as escorts while the navy salvage vessel Grapple and the tugboat Catawba removed obstructions in the waterway. On March 28, Coalition forces sent the first shipload of humanitarian aid into Umm Qasr on board the shallow draft Royal Fleet Auxiliary Sir Galahad under the escort of Adak, Wrangell, a minesweeper and patrol craft Firebolt. Adak and its crew continued escort duties along the KAA into early April. On April 11, Adak escorted Iraq's first commercial shipment on board MV Manar, which carried 700 tons of Red Crescent Society aid of food, water, medical supplies and transport vehicles. Meanwhile, Adak received orders to return to base and, on April 12, Adak redeployed to Bahrain after completing a thirty-five-day non-stop deployment to the NAG.

On April 9, organized resistance had ceased in Baghdad, followed in mid-April by a cessation of resistance in most other Iraqi cities. On May 1, President George Bush announced the end of combat operations in Iraq and the Coalition's offensive operations came to a close. During OIF, Adak, its sister ships and their crews brought many vital capabilities to the theater of operations. The patrol boats operated for many hours without maintenance in waters too shallow for most naval vessels and served as the fleet's workhorses in boarding, escort duty, force protection and maritime interdiction operations. The characteristic white hulls of the WPBs also provided a less antagonizing presence in a highly volatile region. As in past Coast Guard combat missions, such as Vietnam, Coast Guard patrol boats and personnel exceeded all expectations in shallow-water and in-shore maritime operations. Given the frequency that hostilities erupt in the world's littoral regions, shallow-draft Coast Guard units and their specialized personnel will continue to play an important part in future naval operations.

=== Operations Enduring Freedom and Inherent Resolve ===
In a historical twist, the Adak, Aquidneck, and Higgins found themselves working together again. During the 2018 missile strike against Syria, the Higgins launched 23 TLAMs into Syria while Adak and Aquidneck enforced a security zone for her.

== Gallery ==
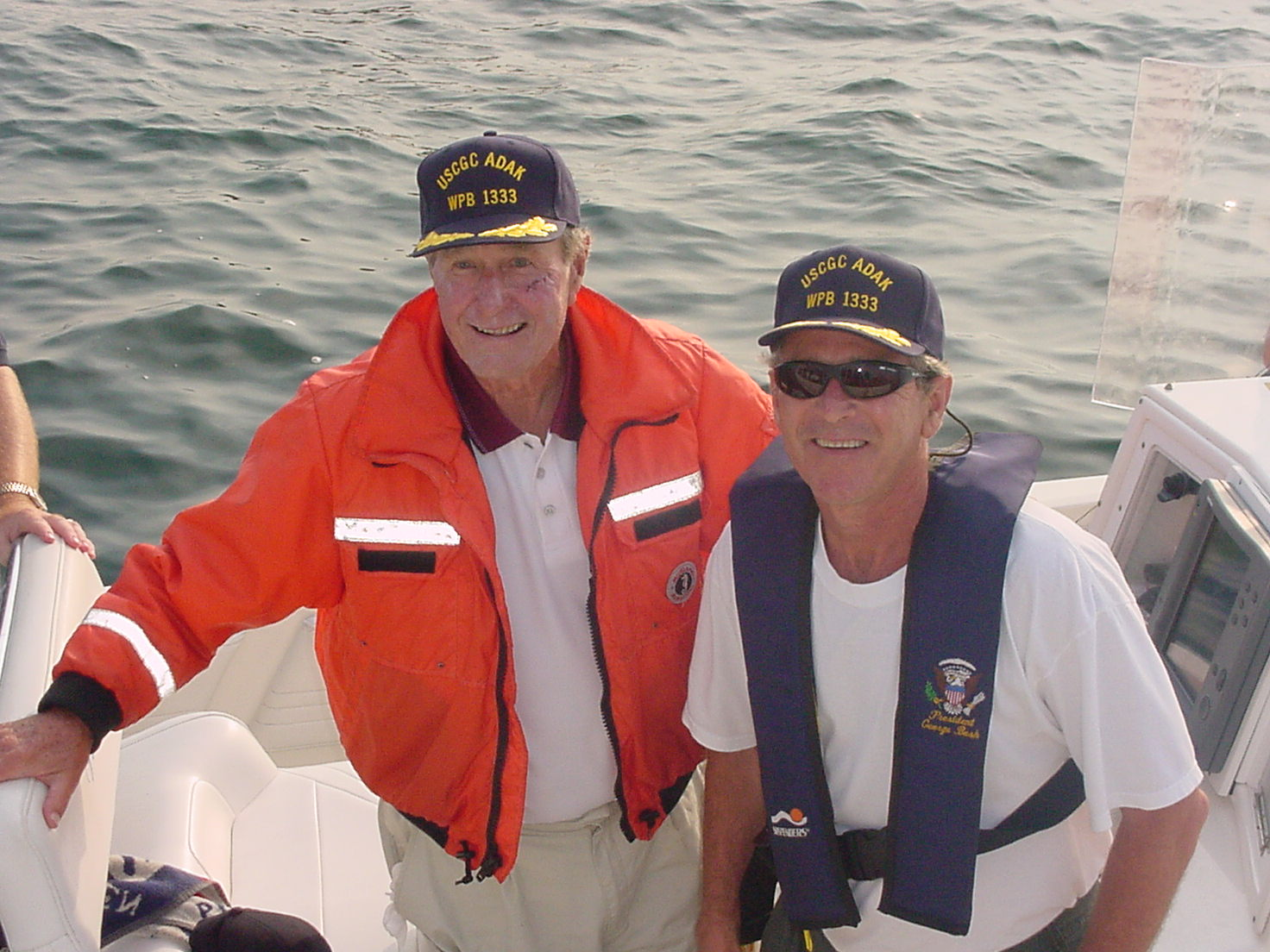
Former Presidents visiting Adak.

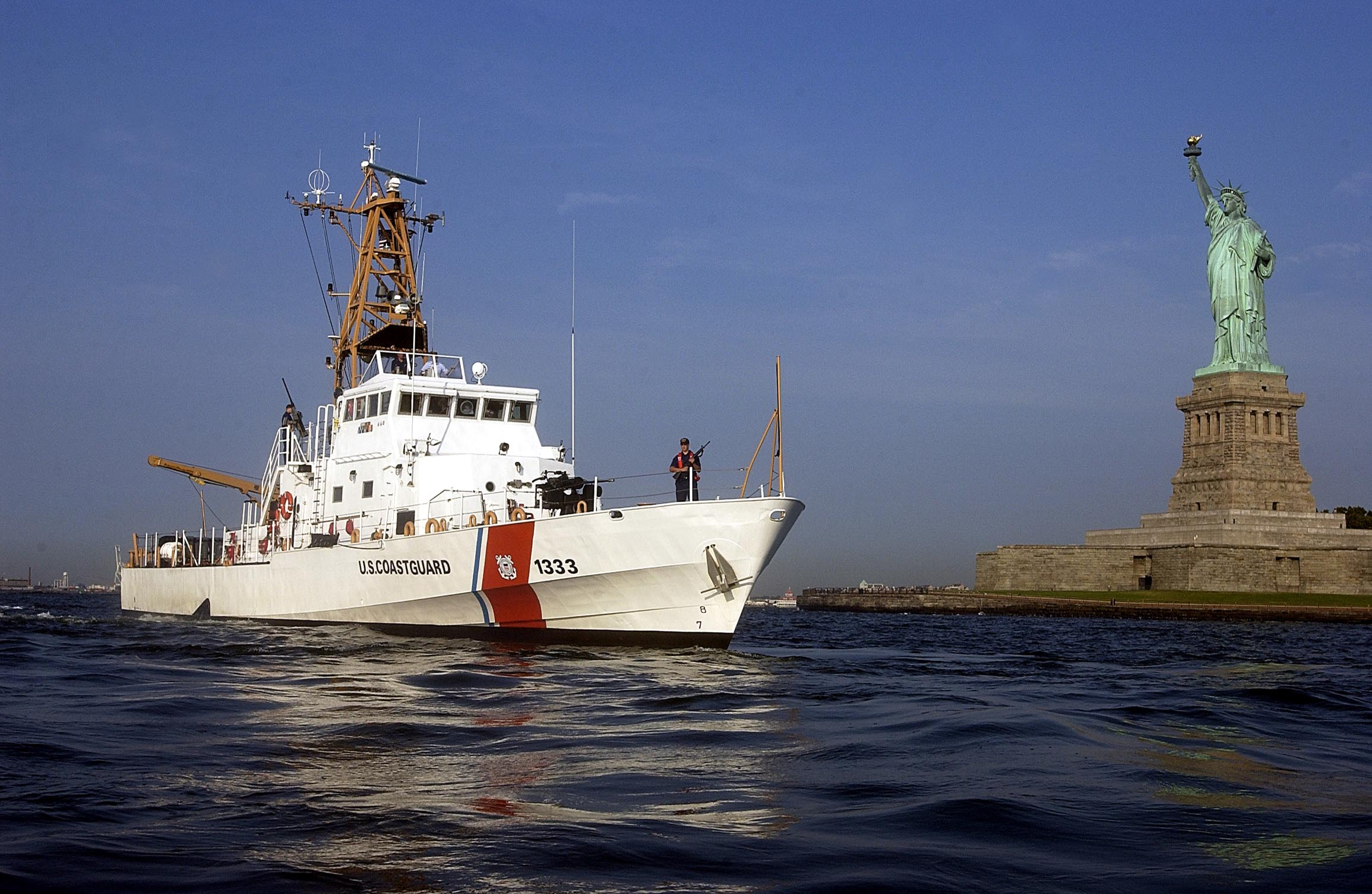
Adak standing watch over New York Harbor.

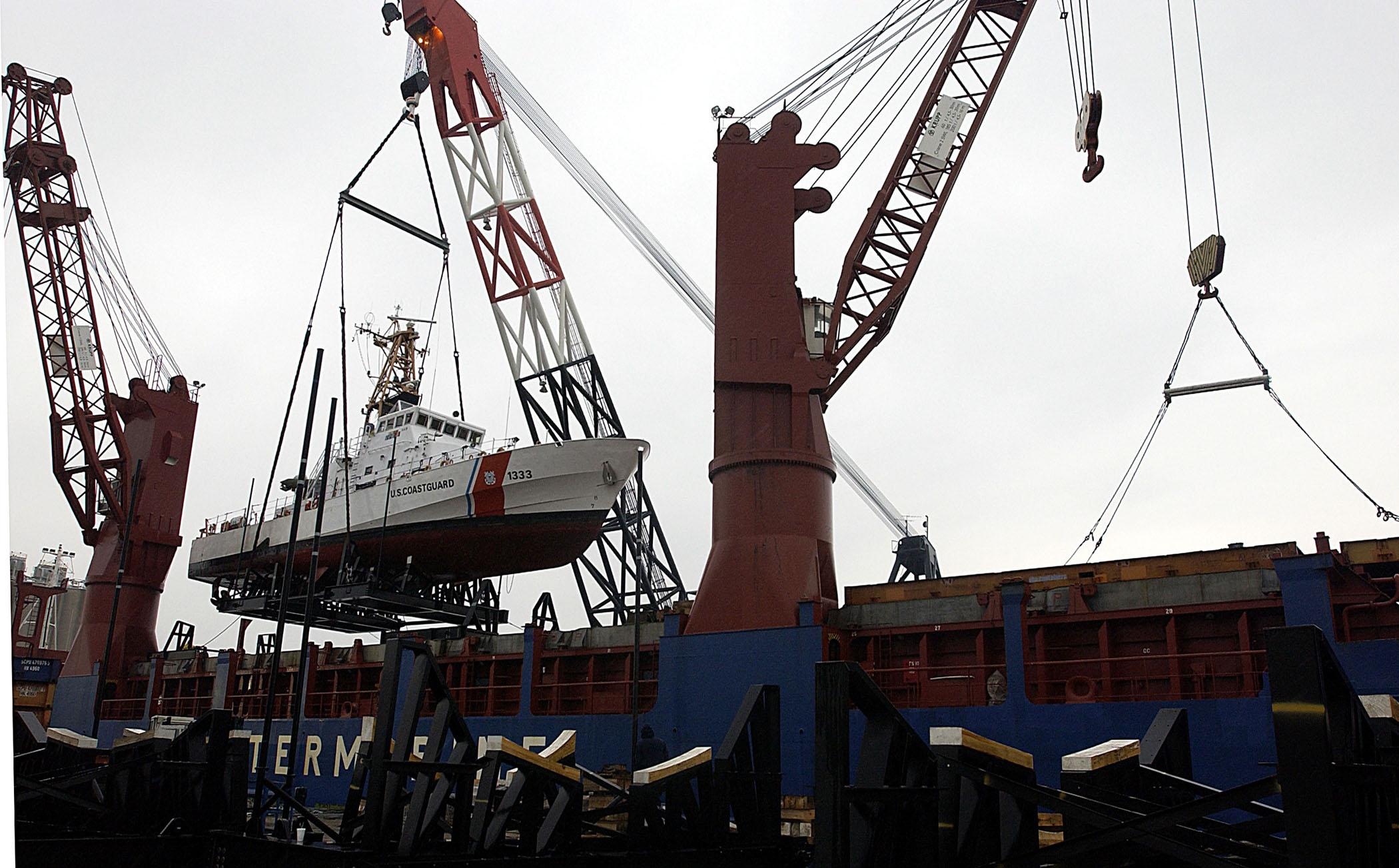
Adak being lifted on a transport ship, en route to the Persian Gulf.

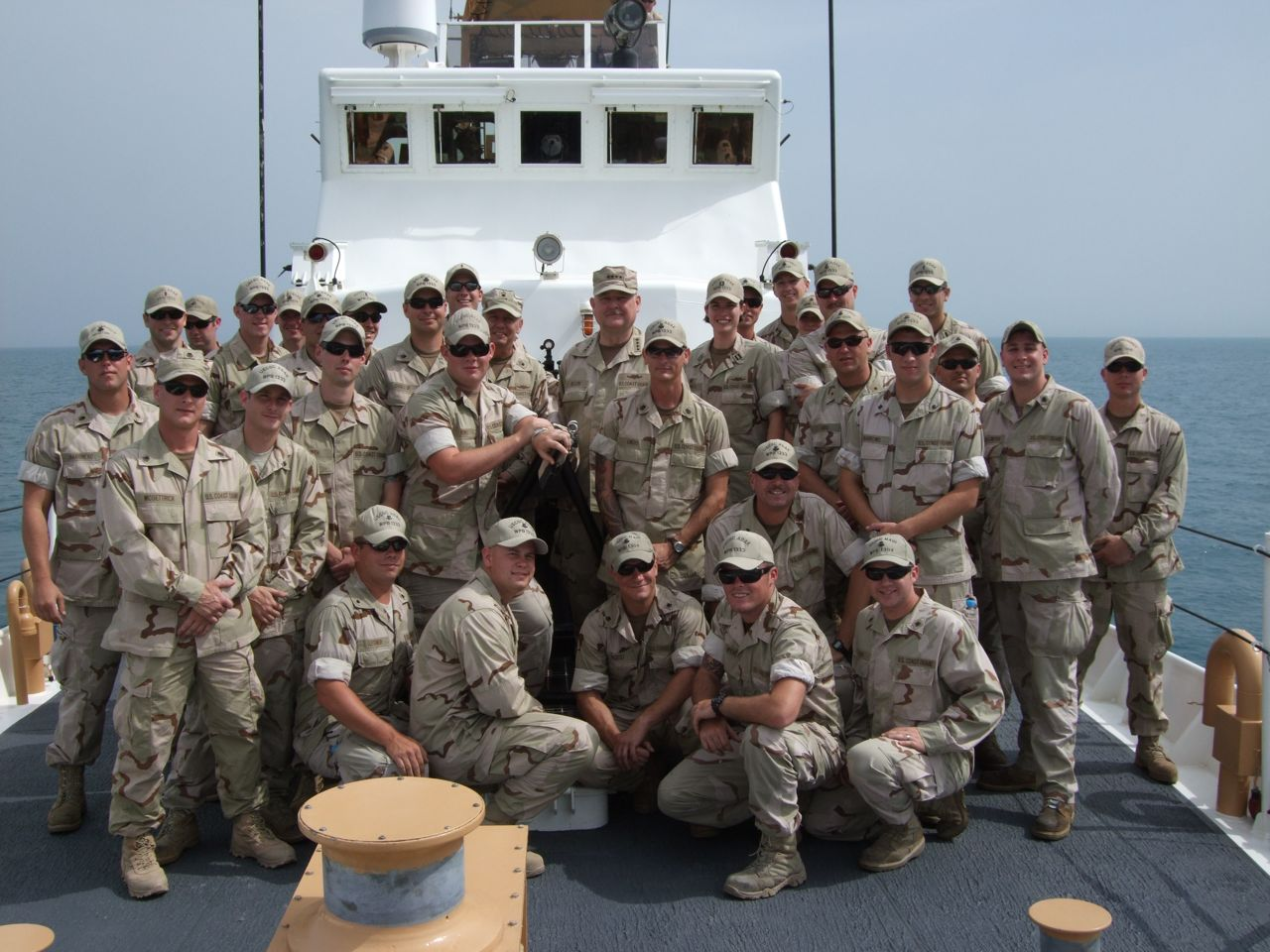
Coast Guard Commandant Thad Allen with crew of Adak, 2009.

== Decommissioning ==
Adak and the other five Island-class patrol boats originally assigned to Patrol Forces Southwest Asia (PATFORSWA) were scheduled to be replaced by new Sentinel-class fast response cutters by 2022. After the arrival of their replacements in May 2021, Adak and her sister ship Aquidneck were decommissioned in Bahrain on 15 June 2021. The U.S. Department of State had planned to transfer Adak to the Indonesian government, but she was eventually handed over to the Greek Navy.
