= Patrol Forces Southwest Asia =

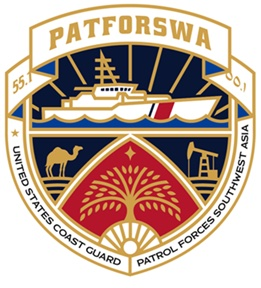
- PATFORSWA Unit Crest
- Active: November 2002 – present
- Country: United States
- Branch: United States Coast Guard
- Part of: U.S. Central Command (CENTCOM); U.S. Naval Forces Central Command (NAVCENT); Fifth Fleet
- Main Operating Base: Naval Support Activity Bahrain, Bahrain
- Engagements: Operation Iraqi Freedom; Operation Enduring Freedom; Global war on terrorism; Operation Inherent Resolve; Operation Spartan Shield; 2016 U.S.–Iran naval incident; 2018 missile strikes against Syria; Operation Allies Refuge; 2026 Iran war
- Website: https://www.atlanticarea.uscg.mil/Our-Organization/Area-Units/PATFORSWA/

Commanders
- Current commander: Commodore Brad Brunaugh
- Command Master Chief: CMDCM Anthony M. Martinez

Patrol Forces Southwest Asia (PATFORSWA) is a United States Coast Guard command based in Manama, Bahrain. PATFORSWA was created in November 2002 as a contingency operation to support the U.S. Navy with patrol boats. The command's mission is to train, equip, deploy, and support combat-ready Coast Guard forces conducting operations in support of Operation Iraqi Freedom (OIF), Operation Enduring Freedom (OEF), Operation Inherent Resolve (OIR) in the Naval Forces Central Command's area of responsibility. It was commissioned as a permanent duty station in June 2004. In July 2003, PATFORSWA moved from its own compound to facilities at Naval Support Activity Bahrain.

== Elements ==
PATFORSWA consists of three distinct elements: six 154-foot Sentinel-class cutters, Shoreside Support, and the Maritime Engagement Team.

=== Cutters ===
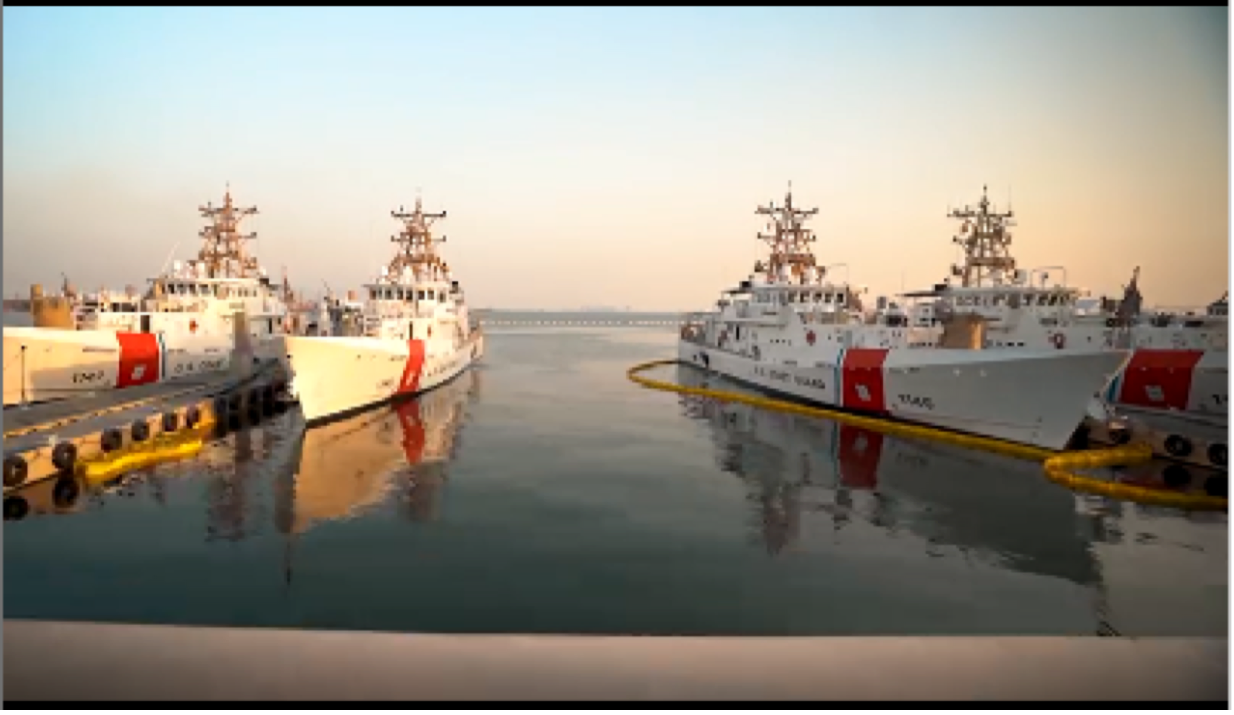
USCG Fast Response Cutters moored in homeport - 2022

The six Sentinel-class cutters, CGC Charles Moulthrope, CGC Robert Goldman, CGC Glen Harris, CGC Emlen Tunnell, CGC John Scheuerman, and CGC Clarence Sutphin Jr are homeported in Bahrain and rely on Shoreside Support for maintenance, logistics, and more.

=== Shoreside Support ===
The Shoreside Support comprises a headquarters element, logistics/supply, maintenance/repair, information/electronics, and armory staff. Today, the shoreside staff numbers roughly 125 enlisted and 14 officers and is headed by an O-6 Captain. Members aid the cutters in routine maintenance, support critical repairs, facilitate the shipping and receiving of parts, enable the movement of personnel, and liaise with Navy leadership. The diverse requirements of the unit make it unique within the Coast Guard, fulfilling elements of a CG Sector, a CG Base, and other CG staff elements.

=== Maritime Engagement Team ===
The Maritime Engagement Team (MET) is responsible for providing specialized law enforcement training to all cutters in theater and certifying their Level II Non-Compliant Boarding Teams. PATFORSWA operates under Title 10 authorities; personnel maintain standard law enforcement qualifications with additional training tailored to the region.

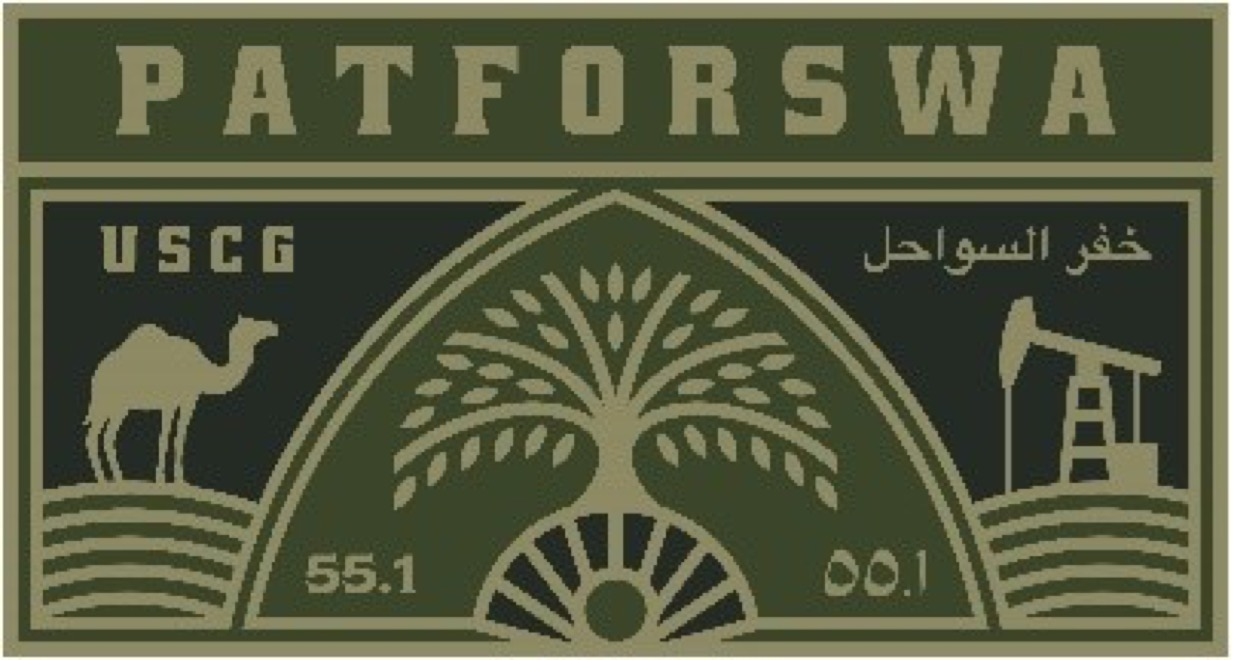
USCG PATFORSWA unit patch - 2022

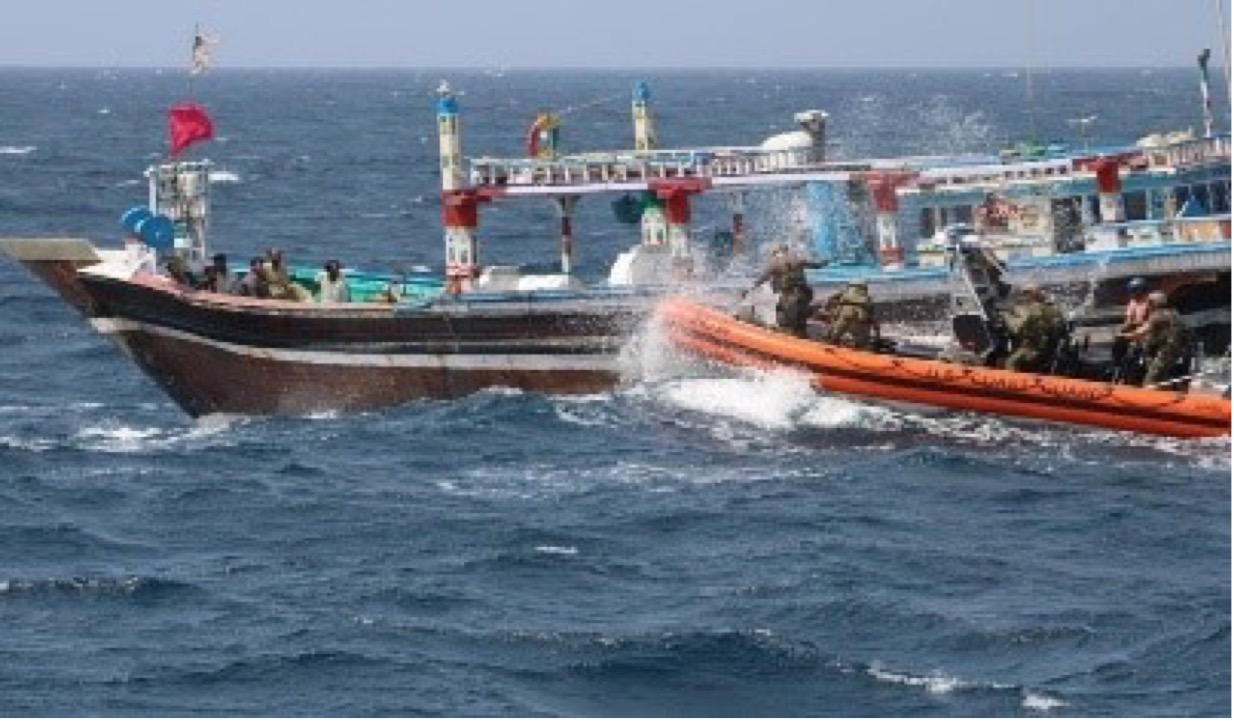
USCG small boat team conducting operations in the Gulf - 31 August 2022

The MET supports shipboard Visit, Board, Search, and Seizure (VBSS) training at their state-of-the-art training center and conducts subject matter expert exchanges with U.S. Department of Defense (DoD) and international partners. The MET travels to participate in broader exercises with regional partners and is the VBSS training center in the Middle East. The interactions with DoD and international partners are key to the MET's mission to build maritime enforcement capacity while strengthening international relations.

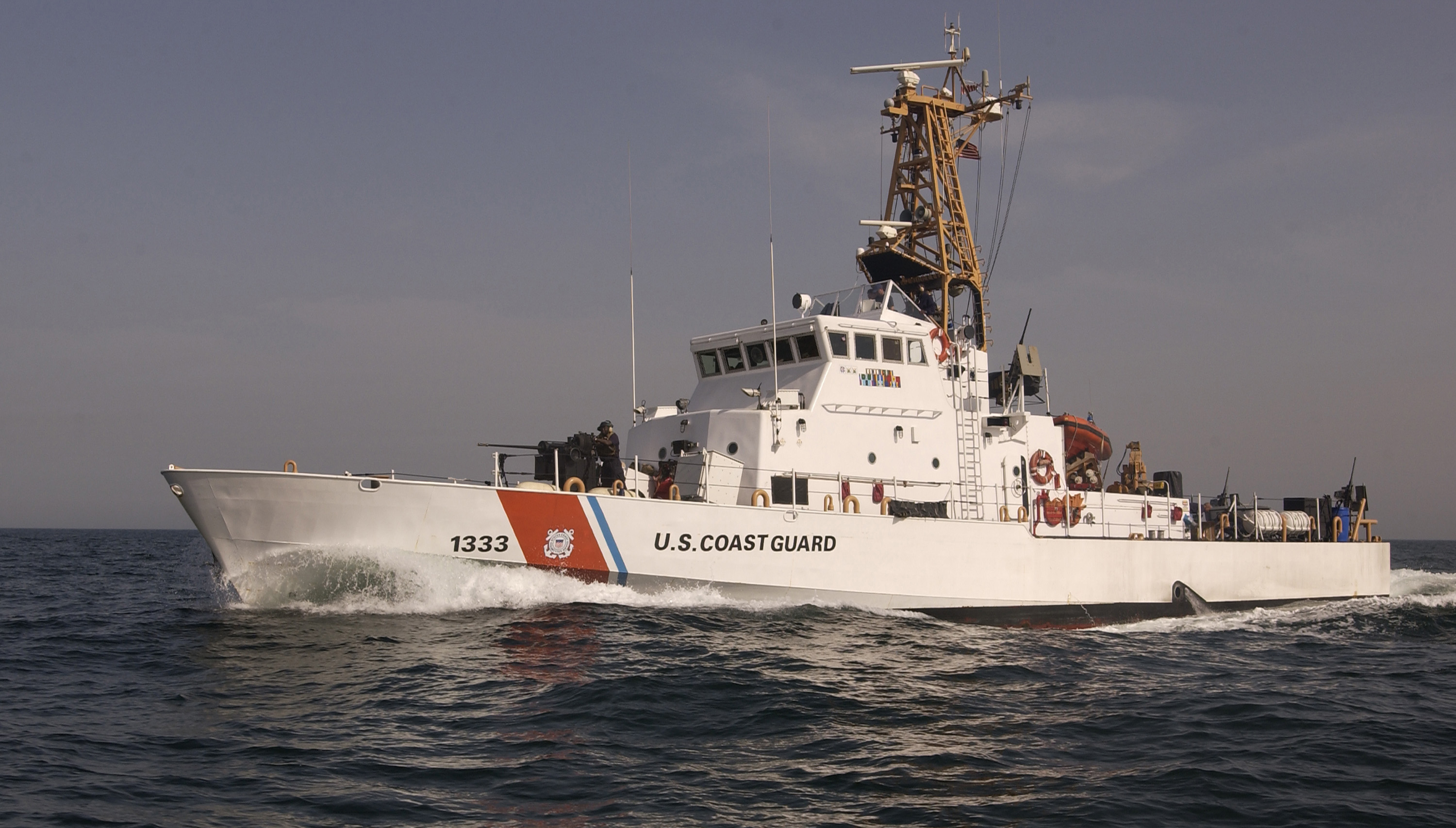
USCGC Adak (WPB 1333), one of six 110-foot patrol boats originally assigned to PATFORSWA

== Unit History ==
=== 2002 Establishment ===
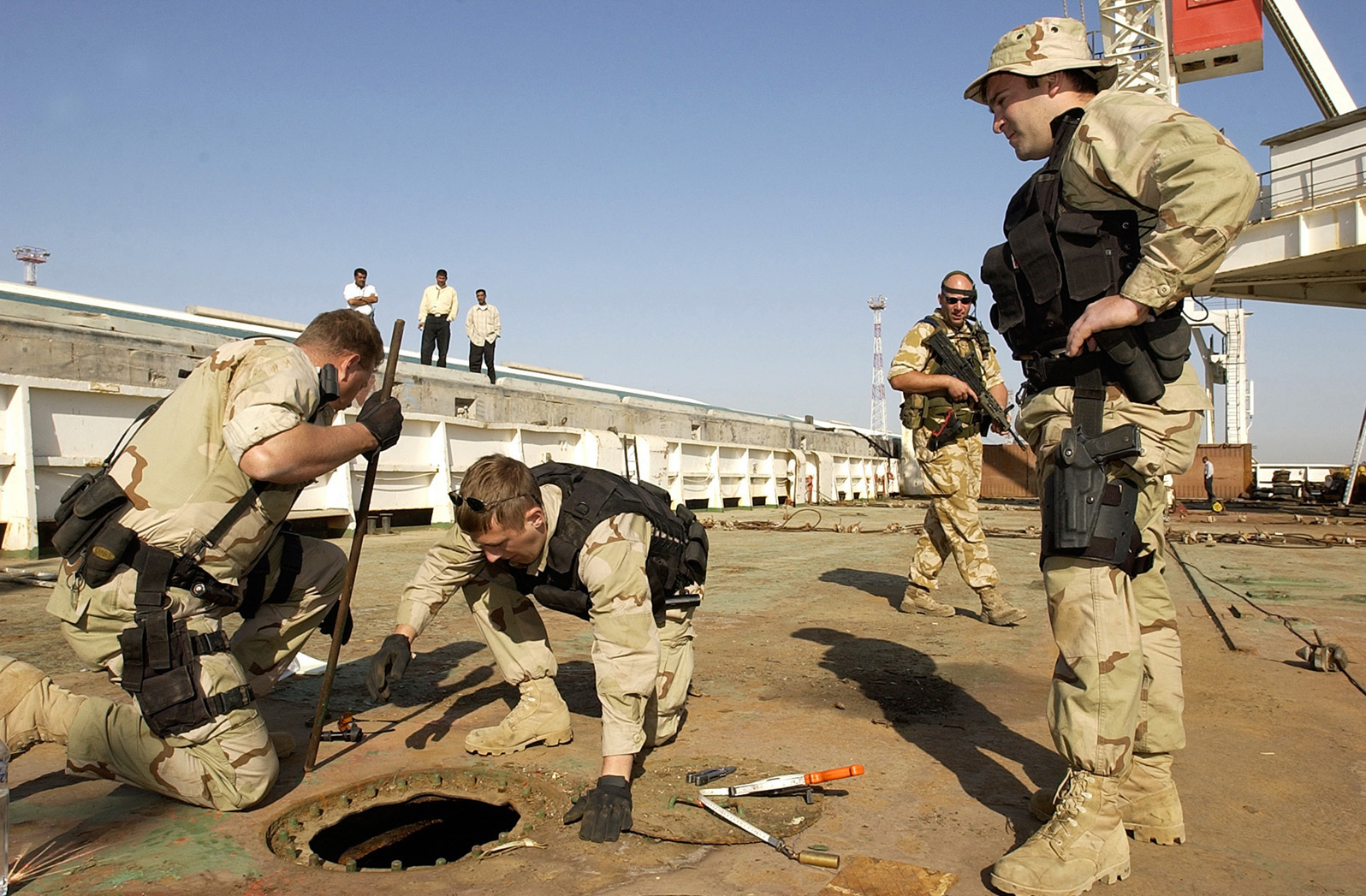
Operation Iraqi Freedom - circa 2003

Initial preparations for naval operations supporting OIF began with the U.S. Navy in the summer and fall of 2002. The navy drew upon its standing contingency plans for combat operations involving Iraq and, in September 2002, United States Naval Forces Central Command (NAVCENT) requested U.S. Coast Guard support for a mission termed “Operation Iraqi Freedom.” The Navy saw the Coast Guard's cutters and skilled personnel as ideally suited to naval operations supporting Operation Iraqi Freedom. The shallow coastal areas and waterways of Iraq are subject to heavy silting and strategists believed that Iraq's primary threat to American naval units came from small boats, patrol craft and mine laying vessels. The Coast Guard's patrol boats would expand the naval presence to shallow littoral areas where larger naval combatants could not navigate and Coast Guard cutters could remain on station for days as opposed to only a few hours typical of the Navy's Special Forces boats. In addition, the law enforcement background of Coast Guard personnel would expand the Navy's ability to intercept and board Iraqi vessels and Coast Guard cutters could serve in force protection and escort duty, thereby freeing naval assets to conduct offensive combat operations. Such naval integration of Coast Guard forces relied upon lessons learned during Vietnam with the deployment of Coast Guard Squadron One and the end of the Cold War with Patrol Boat Squadrons Two and Four.

The Navy called on the Coast Guard to perform missions that have always formed part of the service's peace-time mission. The Navy had very limited capability in boarding, maritime interdiction and even environmental protection and yet operations in Iraq would require units trained in these operations. As a result, the Coast Guard's Port Security Units (PSUs), Law Enforcement Detachments (LEDETs), National Strike Force (NSF), cutters and a variety of other units and personnel deployed overseas to support military operations in OIF. These units included cutters assigned to provide escort and force protection to battle groups and Military Sealift Command (MSC) convoys passing from the Strait of Gibraltar to the eastern Mediterranean.

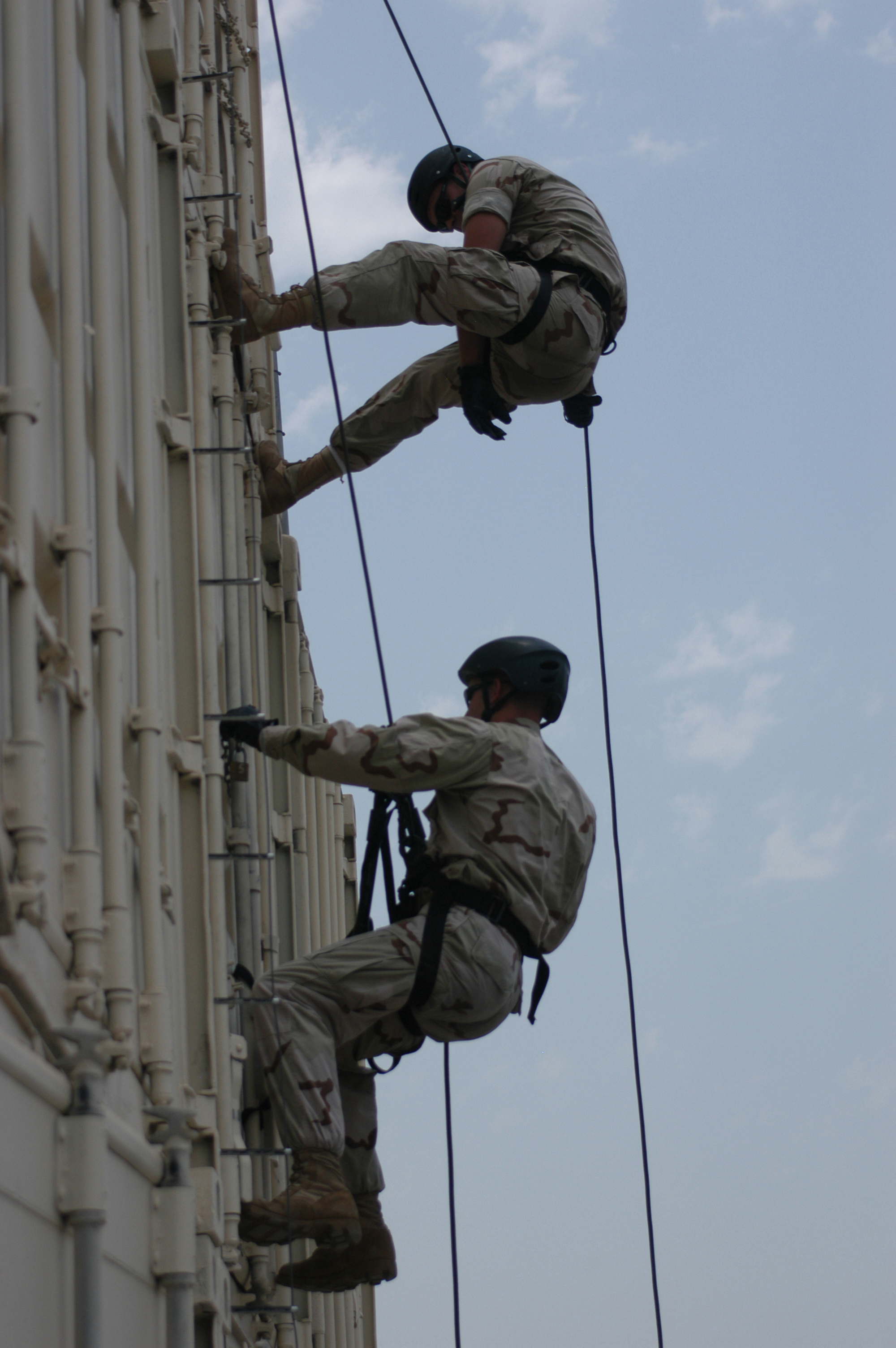
TACLET South training at Patrol Forces Southwest Asia - circa 2006

As it had in previous American combat operations, the Coast Guard conducted operations well suited to cutters and their crews. The maritime conditions of Iraq and the Persian Gulf can greatly limit the operations of most naval vessels and warships. U.S.-led coalition forces that allied against the Iraqi regime of Saddam Hussein included Gulf-based nations that had their own coast guard forces. However, these particular coalition forces dedicated the use of their smaller vessels to protecting Kuwait, rather than operations in Iraqi territorial waters. Due to this and the Coast Guard's expertise in littoral and shallow-water operations, a large part of the request by United States Central Command (CENTCOM) centered on the Coast Guard's smaller patrol boats. Although various Coast Guard units and personnel had served in Operation Desert Shield and Operation Desert Storm in the 1990s, deployment of the service's Island-class patrol boats overseas would represent the first combat deployment of Coast Guard patrol boats since the Vietnam War.

Even though the Coast Guard served a similar mission in Vietnam, there existed no operational plan to provide guidance for OIF planning and preparations. The Coast Guard began its earliest preparations in the final months of 2002 and the lack of any pre-existing plan or blueprint for this sort of mission proved the Coast Guard's greatest challenge. The service's Atlantic Area Command (LANTAREA), headquartered in Portsmouth, Virginia, created a shore detachment to support its cutter operations overseas. These patrol forces detachments would oversee all aspects of operational support, including cutter maintenance and crew rotation. In October, LANTAREA created a shore detachment to oversee personnel, supply and maintenance requirements for patrol boat operations in the Persian Gulf. It designated this detachment as Patrol Forces, Southwest Asia (PATFORSWA). LANTAREA assigned a commanding officer of PATFORSWA and selected four 110-foot Island-class patrol boats (WPBs) for the mission based on their superior maintenance records. These WPBs included Adak, Aquidneck, Baranof, and Wrangell. LANTAREA created a second shore detachment for patrol boat operations in the Mediterranean; designated it Patrol Forces, Mediterranean (PATFORMED); and selected four more patrol boats for Mediterranean service. These WPBs included Bainbridge Island, Grand Isle, Knight Island and Pea Island.

=== 2003 Redeployment Assistance Inspection Detachments ===
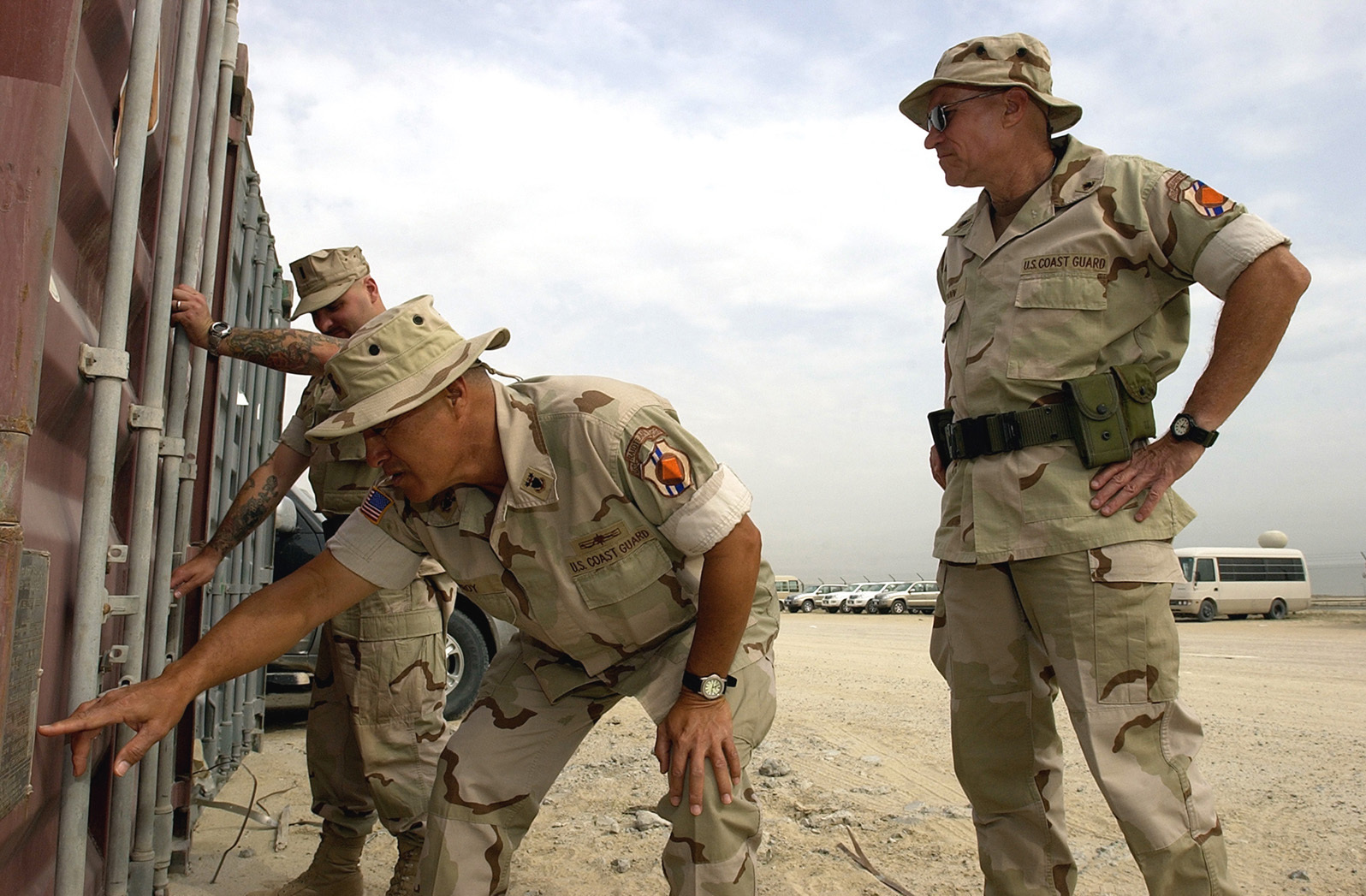
CAMP ARIFJAN, Kuwait-Members of the U.S. Coast Guard's RAID inspect a cargo container for proper labeling of hazardous materials - circa 2006

Redeployment Assistance Inspection Detachments (RAID) consisted of Coast Guardsmen deployed with the U.S Army to support the shipment of materials in and out of war zones. Their mission was to assist the Department of Defense with the safe re-deployment of containerized cargo as well as the storage and segregation of hazardous materials. The Coast Guard's goal was to ensure that hazardous material was properly prepared for shipment and re-entry to U.S. ports. The team moved between Forward Operating Bases, making them among the few Coast Guardsmen to have been so far forward with the U.S. Army in a combat zone.

The first RAID was deployed in 2003 and they were brought under the PATFORSWA command structure in 2010. The RAID was demobilized in May 2015.

=== 2003 PATFORMED ===
The Coast Guard deployed its PATFORMED patrol boats in similar fashion to the PATFORSWA 110s. WPBs Bainbridge Island, Grand Isle, Knight Island and Pea Island arrived at Augusta Bay, Sicily, after a one-month transit on board BBC Spain. It took a monumental effort by PATFORMED support staff to prepare for patrol boat operations in the Mediterranean because no Coast Guard infrastructure existed in the region.

In the Mediterranean, Coast Guard operations supported naval and Military Sealift Command operations in the region. During combat operations in the Persian Gulf, PATFORMED patrol boats supported naval operations in the Mediterranean. The WPB's primary mission had been to escort U.S. Navy supply vessels and Military Sealift Command ships out of Souda Bay, Crete, the eastern Mediterranean's logistics port for American and NATO forces. The naval command cancelled this mission when Turkey would not support the use of its territory for supplying a northern front in Iraq. The four cutters then came under the operational command of the Navy's Task Force 60 for Leadership Interdiction Operations (LIO) in the eastern Mediterranean. This mission required the cutters to cut off a waterborne escape route for Iraqi leaders fleeing through Syria and into the Mediterranean. Syria, however, agreed to seal its borders, cutting off the escape route through its territory to the Mediterranean coast.

2004 - PATFORMED Closed Shortly after Syria closed its borders, the Sixth Fleet released the PATFORMED cutters from operations in the Mediterranean, the cutters then returned to United States by 2004.

=== 2003 Forward Operating Base at Kuwait Naval Base ===
From 2003 till 2021 PATFORSWA operated a Forward Operating Base at Kuwait Naval Base also known as Camp Patriot. This location stationed rotating engineering support for the Island-class patrol boats operating in the Northern Arabian Sea, allowing the vessels to stay on station longer. In addition Port Security Units regularly rotated through this location protecting the Naval Base and the water ways near Kuwait and Iraq.

=== 2004 Al Basrah Oil Terminal & Mina Khawr al Amiyah Oil Terminal ===
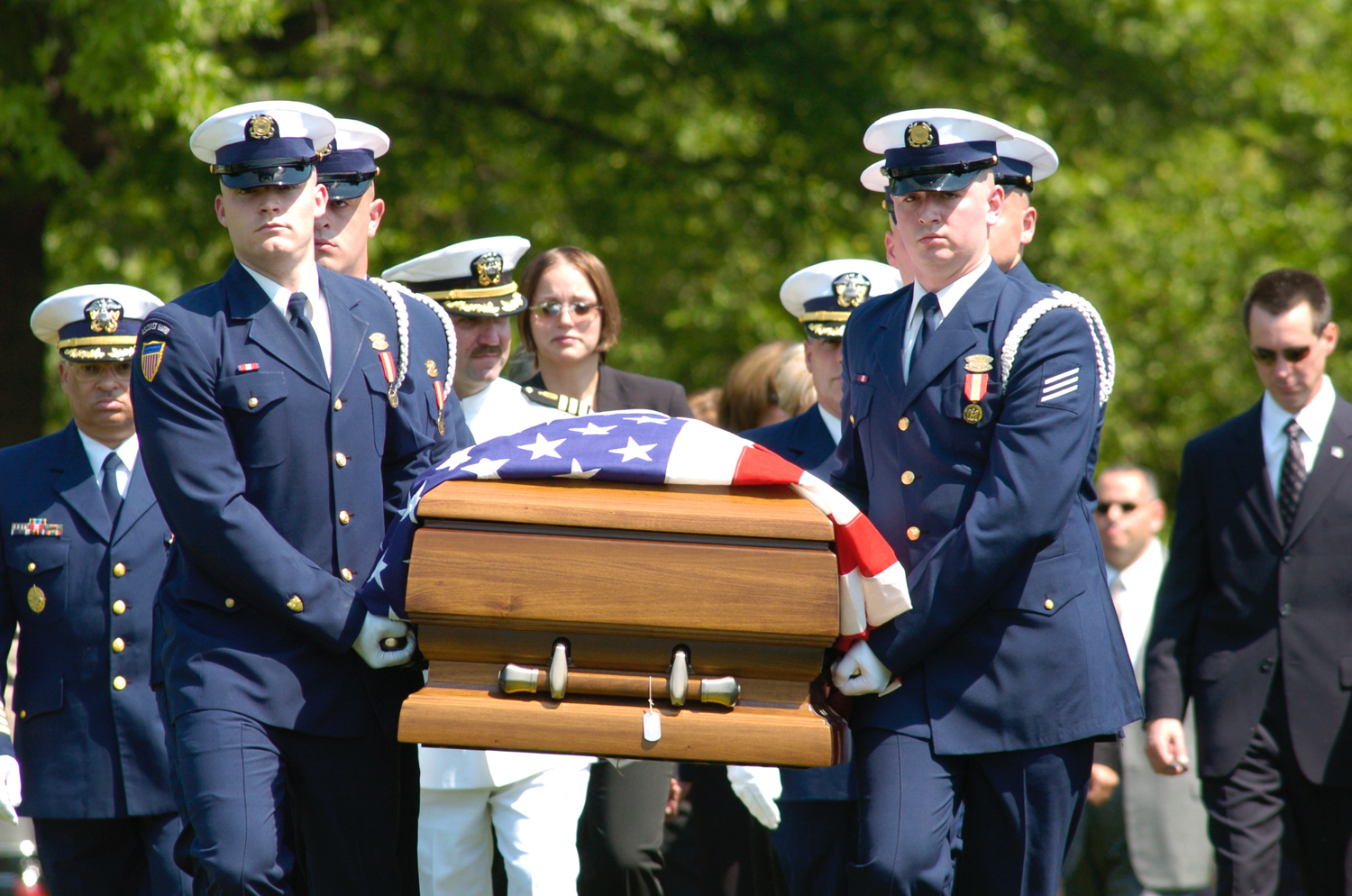
DC3 Bruckenthal Funeral, Arlington National Cemetery

On 24 April 2004, Damage Controlman Third Class Nathan Bruckenthal, USCG, and two U.S. Navy Sailors - Petty Officer 1st Class Michael Pernaselli and Petty Officer 2nd Class Christopher Watts, were killed while boarding a dhow that was approaching the Khawr Al Amaya oil terminal.

The service members were part of a seven-man visit, board, search and seizure (VBSS) team from USS Firebolt, a 174-foot Cyclone-class coastal patrol boat conducting missions in the Northern Persian Gulf in support of OIF. Other members of the team, three Navy Sailors and one Coast Guardsman, were injured but survived the attack.

Bruckenthal is the first Coast Guardsman to be killed in combat since the Vietnam War and the only to die in support of Operation Iraqi Freedom.

As the Firebolt's rigid -hulled inflatable boat (RHIB) pulled alongside the dhow, a suicide bomber onboard the dhow set off explosives. The blast flipped the RHIB and threw its team into the water. The attack alerted other forces in the area to what was a coordinated attack on Iraq's oil terminals in the Gulf and prevented further loss of life and irreparable damages.

Upon the family's request, PATFORSWA hosts a memorial service to honor and remember the fallen shipmates and the sacrifice they made every year since.

July 25, 2018 - The Coast Guard commissioned the 28th fast response cutter (FRC) (Sentinel-class cutter), USCGC Nathan Bruckenthal, in Alexandria, Virginia in honor of Bruckenthal.

=== 2018 Syrian missile strike ===
During the 2018 Syrian missile strike, Patrol Forces Southwest Asia supported the action with the deployment of Adak and Aquidneck. The two patrol boats joined the HIGGINS Surface Action Group, that subsequently launched 23 Tomahawk Land Attack Missiles against chemical weapons sites in Syria. Higgins, Adak, and Aquidneck previously worked together at the beginning of Operation Iraqi Freedom—also for TLAM strikes.

=== 2021 Cutter Change ===
In 2021 the squadron commenced the most drastic change since the unit's conception, decommissioning the aging 110’ WPBs and bringing in the 154’ WPC Fast Response Cutters. The first two replacement cutters, Charles Moulthrope and Robert Goldman arrived at their new homeport on 25 May 2021 to replace the cutters Adak and Aquidneck, which were subsequently decommissioned on 15 June 2021.The next two replacement cutters Glen Harris and Emlen Tunnell sailed for Bahrain before the end of 2021, arriving in March 2022, shortly before the cutters Maui, Monomoy and Wrangell were decommissioned on 22 March 2022.The cutters John Scheuerman and Clarence Sutphin Jr arrived in Bahrain on 23 August 2022 and the final 110’ WPB in theater, Baranof, was decommissioned on 26 September 2022.

The swap coincided with a new mission focus on counter smuggling stretching beyond the Persian Gulf. The new cutters brought new capabilities which the Navy was quick to recognize and employ. Cutters patrol the waters of the Gulf of Oman and Northern Arabian Sea, remaining on patrol of weeks and covering thousands of miles. Their crews quickly saw success, leveraging their experience in fisheries and counter drug enforcement to interdict numerous shipments of narcotics including hashish, heroin, methamphetamine, and captagon, as well as 170 tons of explosive precursor material.

=== 2021 Afghanistan Withdrawal / Operation Allies Refuge ===
During the 2021 withdrawal from Afghanistan and subsequent humanitarian evacuation, PATFORSWA personnel integrated in the crisis response system. Shoreside Support assisted individuals being evacuated from Afghanistan.

=== Evolving mission ===
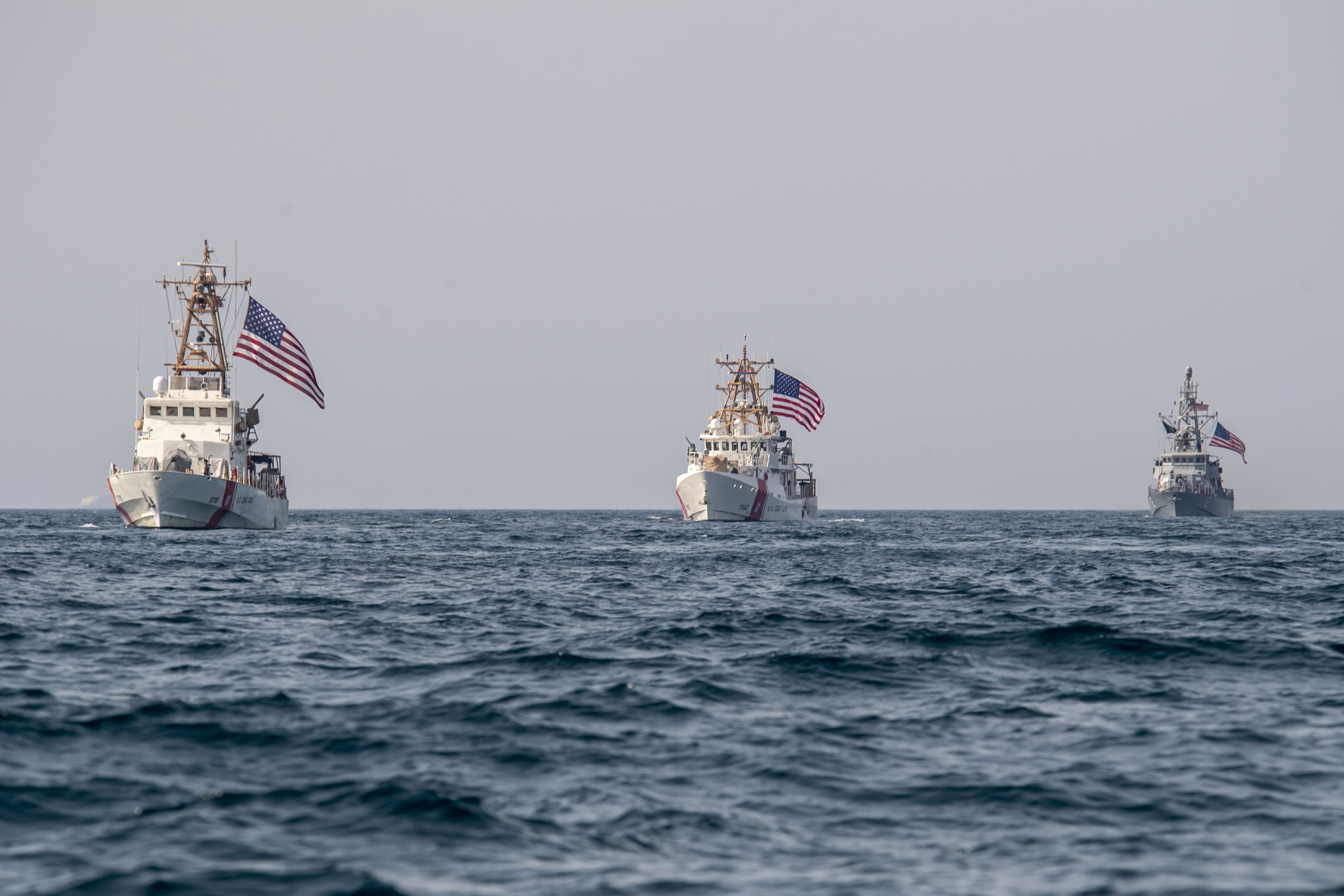
USCGC Baranof, USCGC Robert Goldman, and USS Thunderbolt patrol the Persian Gulf June 2022

Throughout the 20 years since PATFORSWA establishment, the cutters performed a variety of missions in and around the Persian Gulf. As the war in Iraq ebbed and shifted, the cutter mission expanded from a focus on protecting maritime infrastructure in Iraq to more broadly protecting free commerce in the Persian Gulf, countering malign actors in the region, and building regional partnerships. Cutters routinely patrolled the entire Persian Gulf and participating in international exercises in the area. Recognized for their adept ability to counter small combatants, they were the ideal platform to escort vessels through the Strait of Hormuz. Throughout this period the cutters worked closely with the Navy Coastal Patrol Craft (PCs) also stationed in Bahrain. This force of small combatants was routinely on the frontline against the unsafe and unprofessional interactions with the Iranian Revolutionary Guard Corps Navy.

On 28 February 2026, PATWORSFA's port facilities at Naval Support Activity Bahrain suffered serious damage from attacks by Iranian missiles and suicide drones. On 15 July 2026, it was announced that the headquarters of the expeditionary cutter squadron had been moved to Singapore and transferred from U.S. Central Command to U.S. Pacific Command. In June, the six fast response cutters began carrying out patrol activities in the South China Sea based out of Singapore and Subic Bay in the Philippines.

== Notable Seizures ==
- The United States Coast Guard's mission, under the Maritime Drug Law Enforcement Act and UN resolutions, includes seizing drugs in international waters or on behalf of partner nations.
- The direct or indirect supply, sale, or transfer of weapons to the Houthis in Yemen violates U.N. Security Resolution 2216 (as extended and renewed by resolutions 2675 and 2707) and international law.

$	Description	USCG Asset	Date
N/A	Cache of weapons consisted of thousands of AK-47 assault rifles, light machine guns, heavy sniper rifles, rocket-propelled grenade launchers, and crew served weapons. Other weapon components included barrels, stocks, optical scopes and weapon systems.	USCG Advanced Interdiction Team (AIT) with U.S. NAVY	11-Feb-21
N/A	Cache of weapons included dozens of advanced Russian-made anti-tank guided missiles, thousands of Chinese Type 56 assault rifles, and hundreds of PKM machine guns, sniper rifles and rocket-propelled grenades launchers. Other weapon components included advanced optical sights.	USCG Advanced Interdiction Team (AIT) with U.S. NAVY	7-May-21
N/A	U.S. 5th Fleet ships seized approximately 1,400 AK-47 assault rifles and 226,600 rounds of ammunition from a stateless fishing vessel during a flag verification boarding in accordance with customary international law in the North Arabian Sea.	USCG Advanced Interdiction Team (AIT) with U.S. NAVY	22-Dec-21
$4 Million	(kg not listed) heroin	USCG Advanced Interdiction Team (AIT) with U.S. NAVY	27-Dec-21
$11 Million	310 kg heroin	CGC Glen Harris	31-May-22
$20 Million	2,980 kg hashish, 320 kg amphetamine pills	CGC Glen Harris	30-Aug-22
$85 Million	2,410 kg heroin	CGC Charles Mouthrope	27-Sep-22
$48 Million	5,000 kg hashish, 800 kg methamphetamine	CGC Glen Harris	10-Oct-22
N/A	70 tons of ammonium perchlorate - explosive oxidizer, 100 tons of urea explosive precursor	CGC John Scheuerman	15-Nov-22
$33 Million	4,000 kg hashish, 512 kg methamphetamine	CGC Emlen Tunnell	31-Jan-23
$20 Million	1,350 kg hashish, 276 kg methamphetamine, 23 kg amphetamine pills	CGC John Scheuerman	25-Feb-23
$42 Million	1000 kg hashish, 802 kg methamphetamine	USCG Advanced Interdiction Team (AIT) with U.S. NAVY	21-Apr-23
$30 Million	580 kg methamphetamine, 35 kg heroin	CGC Glen Harris	8-May-23
$80 Million	1,964 kg heroin	CGC Glen Harris	10-May-23
$14 Million	2,000 kg hashish, 384 kg methamphetamine	CGC Emlen Tunnell	14-Nov-23
$3 Million	90 kg heroin	CGC Clarence Sutphin Jr.	24-Dec-23
$21.3 Million	142 kg heroin, 2936 kg hashish, 261 kg methamphetamine, 75,000 pills opium substitutes	CGC John Scheuerman	26-Dec-23
$24.3 Million	3,514 kg hashish, 417 kg methamphetamines	CGC Robert Goldman	28-Dec-23
$11 Million	37 kg heroin, 187 kg methamphetamine, 5 kg cocaine	CGC Emlen Tunnell	8-Jan-24
$8.1 Million	173 kg methamphetamine	CGC Emlen Tunnell	16-Jan-24
N/A	Seized advanced conventional weapons and other lethal aid originating in Iran and bound to Houthi-controlled Yemen from a vessel in the Arabian Sea. The boarding team discovered over 200 packages that contained medium-range ballistic missile components, explosives, unmanned underwater/surface vehicle (UUV/USV) components, military-grade communication and network equipment, anti-tank guided missile launcher assemblies, and other military components.	CGC Clarance Sutphin Jr.	28-Jan-24
N/A	770 kg methamphetamine	CGC Glen Harris	5-Mar-24
N/A	15 kg heroin, 375 methamphetamine	CGC Glen Harris	8-Apr-24
N/A	257 kg methamphetamine, 92 kg heroine, 17 kg amphetamine, 296 kg hashish, 15 kg marijuana	CGC Clarance Sutphin Jr.	14-Apr-24

== Notable Interactions ==
Description	USCG Asset	Date
Rendered aid to Iranian mariners	CGC Monomoy	10-Jan-12
PATFORSWA MET and HMS Portland Conduct Joint Exercise	Maritime Engagement Team (MET)	31-Jul-16
U.S. Coast Guard, Iraqi Navy Participate in PASSEX Exercise	CGC Maui, CGC Wrangell	3-Oct-16
U.S. Forces and Bahrain Defense Force Completed Neon Response 19 - Vessel, board, search and seizure, First Aid, Explosives Ordinance Disposal, harbor clearance, floating mine response, mine field clearance training	Maritime Engagement Team (MET)	19-Jun-19
Guided-missile cruiser USS Normandy (CG60) conducted Maritime Security Operations (MSO) training with members of the Pakistani Navy during International Maritime Exercise (IMX) 2019	USCG Advanced Interdiction Team (AIT) with U.S. NAVY	7-Nov-19
IRGCN Vessels Conduct Unsafe, Unprofessional Interaction with U.S. Naval Forces in Persian Gulf	CGC Maui, CGC Wrangell	15-Apr-20
The guided-missile destroyer USS Winston S. Churchill (DDG 81) participated in the bilateral joint and combined air operations in support of maritime surface warfare (AOMSW) exercise with Royal Saudi Armed Forces in the Persian Gulf	USCG Advanced Interdiction Team (AIT) with U.S. NAVY	18-Dec-20
Three Iranian Islamic Revolutionary Guard Corps Navy (IRGCN) fast inshore attack craft (FIAC) failed to exercise due regard for the safety of other vessels as required under international law as they came into close proximity to U.S. naval vessels in international waters of the north Persian Gulf. (FIAC example - Seraj-class speedboat)	CGC Baranof	26-Apr-21
Unsafe and Unprofessional Interaction with IRGCN FIAC in Strait of Hormuz (FIAC example - Seraj-class speedboat)	CGC Maui, CGC Wrangell	10-May-21
Kuwait and U.S. Naval Forces Complete Exercise Eager Defender 21	CGC Monomoy	14-Jun-21
New U.S. Coast Guard Cutters Visit Egypt Marking Arrival to 5th Fleet	CGC Glen Harris, CGC Emlen Tunnel	26-Jan-22
U.S. Coast Guard Cutters Visit Lebanon for Bilateral Exchanges	CGC Glen Harris, CGC Emlen Tunnel	3-Feb-22
New Coast Guard Cutters Visit Lebanon for 1st Middle East Stop	CGC John Scheuerman, CGC Clarence Sutphin Jr.	25-Jul-22
Top Coast Guard Chefs Excel in Bahrain	CGC Charles Mouthrope	13-Sep-22
U.S. Coast Guard Ships Visit Pakistan	CGC Charles Mouthrope, CGC Emlen Tunnell	9-Oct-22
U.S., UK and Saudi Arabia Complete Naval Exercise in Arabian Gulf	CGC Charles Moulthrope, CGC Robert Goldman	8-Nov-22
U.S., Regional Partners Form Multinational Boarding Team in Middle East	PATFORSWA	16-Dec-22
IMSC Task Force Completes Maritime Exercise with Unmanned Systems, A.I.	CGC Baranof	9-Jan-23
An unmanned surface vessel from U.S. 5th Fleet transited the Strait of Hormuz with two U.S. Coast Guard cutters, April 19, demonstrating the continued operational integration of unmanned and artificial intelligence systems by U.S. maritime forces in the Middle East.	CGC Charles Mouthrope, CGC John Scheuerman	19-Apr-23
Eagle Resolve 23 Exercise with Saudi Arabia	CGC Robert Goldman, CGC Emlen Tunnell	28-May-23
U.S. Naval Forces Advances Interoperability Search and Rescue Exercise with the Royal Bahrain Navy	CGC Robert Goldman	25-Sep-23
USS Firebolt Heroes Remembered, 20 Years On	PATFORSWA, U.S. NAVY	24-Apr-24

== See also ==
- Port Security Unit
- Law Enforcement Detachments
- Deployable Specialized Forces
- Coast Guard Squadron One
