= Abu Flous Port =

Port in iraq

- Interactive map of Abu Flous Port
- Native name: ميناء أبو فلوس

Location
- Country: Iraq
- Location: Abu Al-Khaseeb, Basrah, Iraq
- Coordinates: 30°27′27.52″N 48°1′21.87″E

Details
- Type of harbour: Seaport

Abu Flous Port (Arabic: ميناء أبو فلوس) is an Iraqi port. It lies in Abu Al-Khaseeb, Basrah and is situated on the western bank of the Shatt al-Arab river.

== See also ==
- List of ports in Iraq
