= List of ports in Iraq =

List of ports and harbours in Iraq.

== Ports ==
- Abu Flous Port
- Al Başrah Oil Terminal
- Grand Faw Port
- Khor Al Amaya Oil Terminal
- Khor Al Zubair Port
- Port of Basra
- Umm Qasr Port
