= Nathan Bruckenthal =

United States Coast Guardsman

Nathan B. Bruckenthal
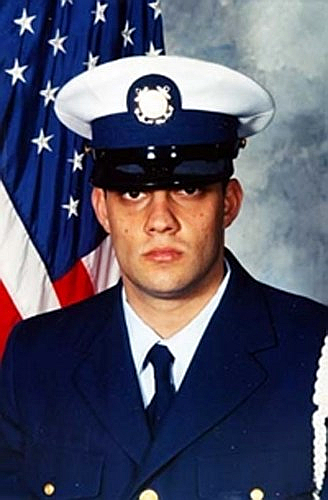
- Born: July 17, 1979; Stony Brook, New York, U.S.
- Died: April 24, 2004 (aged 24); Near Khawr Al Amaya Oil Terminal, Northern Persian Gulf
- Burial place: Section 60, Site 7978, Arlington National Cemetery, Arlington County, Virginia, US
- Spouse: Pattie Bruckenthal (wife)
- Relatives: Ric Bruckenthal (father); Laurie Bullock (mother); Harper Natalie Bruckenthal (daughter)
- Military career
- Allegiance: United States
- Branch: United States Coast Guard
- Service years: 1999–2004
- Rank: Damage controlman third class
- Nickname: "Nate"
- Units: TACLET South, LEDET 403, assigned to the USS Firebolt
- Conflicts: Iraq War: Operation Iraqi Freedom †

Nathan B. "Nate" Bruckenthal (July 17, 1979 – April 24, 2004) was a United States coast guardsman who was killed in the Iraq War, becoming the first to die in wartime action since the Vietnam War. Bruckenthal and two U.S. Navy sailors were killed while intercepting a waterborne suicide attack on an offshore oil terminal off the coast of Iraq in the northern Persian Gulf in 2004.

Bruckenthal was posthumously awarded the Bronze Star Medal with Combat Distinguishing Device and the Purple Heart for his actions.

== Early life and education ==
Bruckenthal was born in Stony Brook, New York, the son of Ric Bruckenthal of Northport, New York, and Laurie Bullock of Ashburn, Virginia. While growing up he had also lived in Hawaii, Virginia, and Connecticut. Bruckenthal and his family lived in Ridgefield, Connecticut from 1992 to 1995, where he was a volunteer firefighter from 1997 to 1998. Bruckenthal was a graduate of Ridgefield High School and intended to follow his service in the U.S. Coast Guard by subsequently going to college and becoming a policeman or a fireman.

== Career ==
=== United States Coast Guard ===
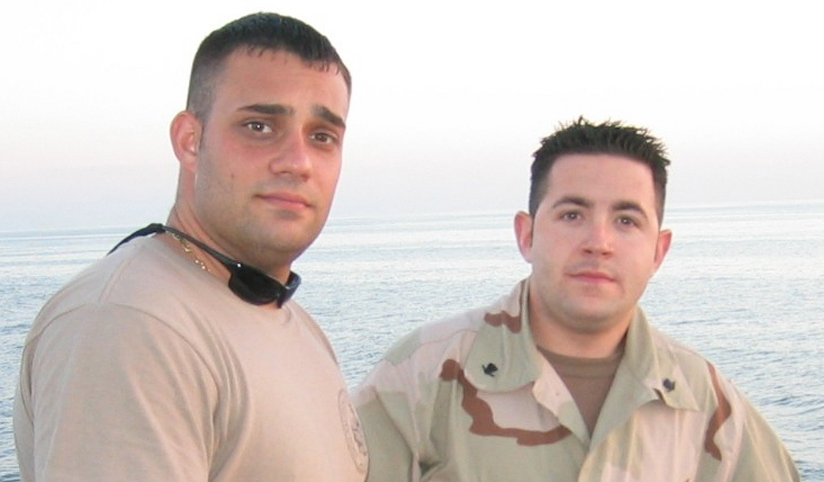
Bruckenthal and Petty Officer Third Class Joseph T. Ruggiero.

Bruckenthal joined the U.S. Coast Guard on January 5, 1999. He served on USCGC Point Wells, based out of Montauk, New York, prior to attending Damage Controlman "A" School. After his schooling, he was assigned to Station Neah Bay in the northwest corner of Washington on the Makah Indian Reservation.

His next assignment was to Tactical Law Enforcement (TACLET) Team South, at Coast Guard Air Station Miami. Bruckenthal's first tour to the Persian Gulf region was from April to June 2003. He departed home for his second deployment in February 2004 and was due to return that June. During both tours his detachment, LEDET 403, was assigned to the USS Firebolt.

On his first deployment to the Persian Gulf region, Bruckenthal was awarded the Armed Forces Expeditionary Medal and the Combat Action Ribbon.

==== Attack in the Persian Gulf ====
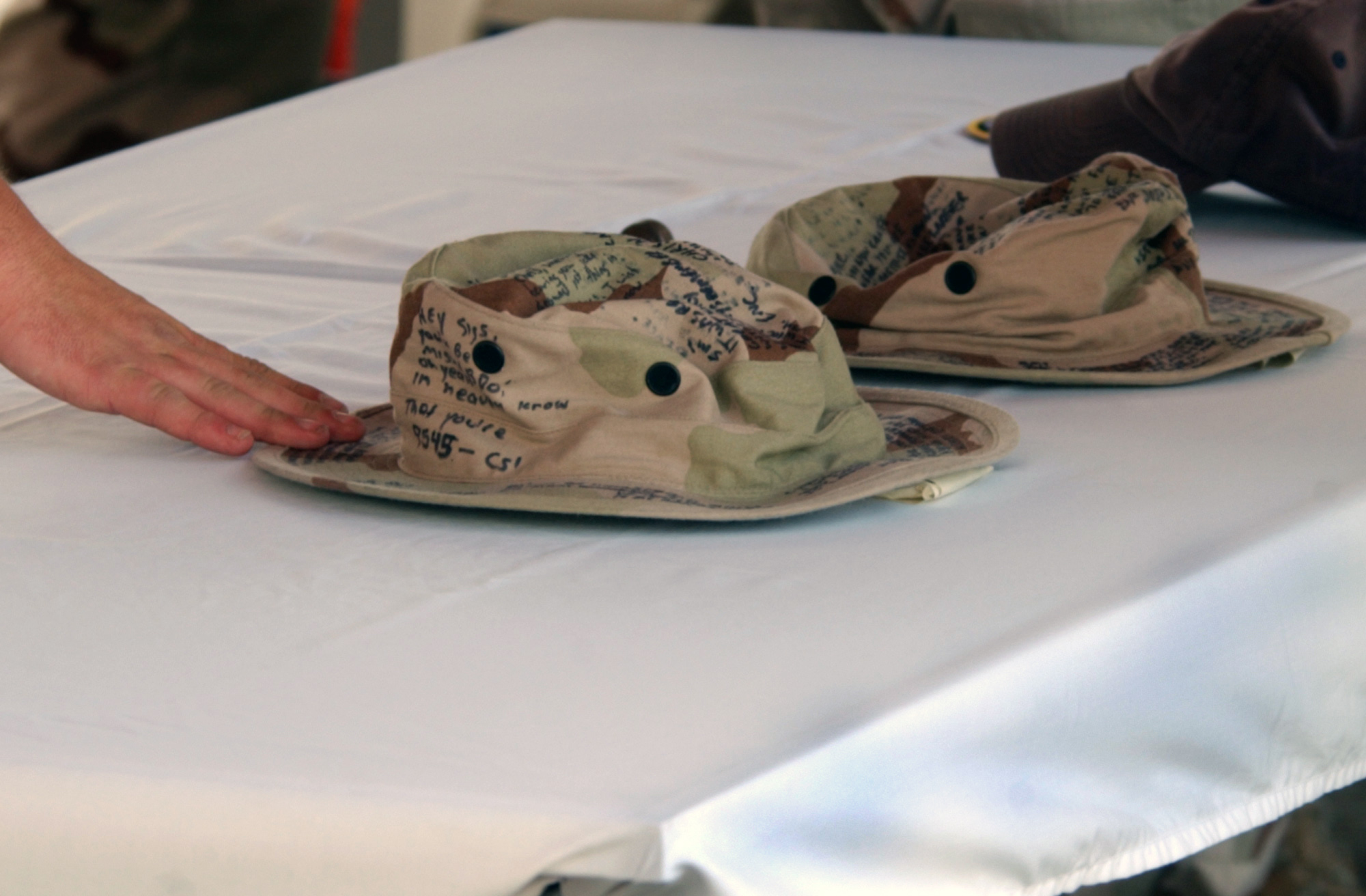
Boonie hats inscribed with messages of consolation are displayed during a memorial service to Bruckenthal, Christopher E. Watts, and Michael J. Pernaselli in April 2004.

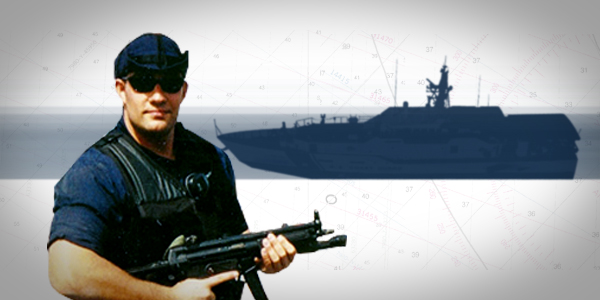
Nathan Bruckenthal on duty in Iraq.

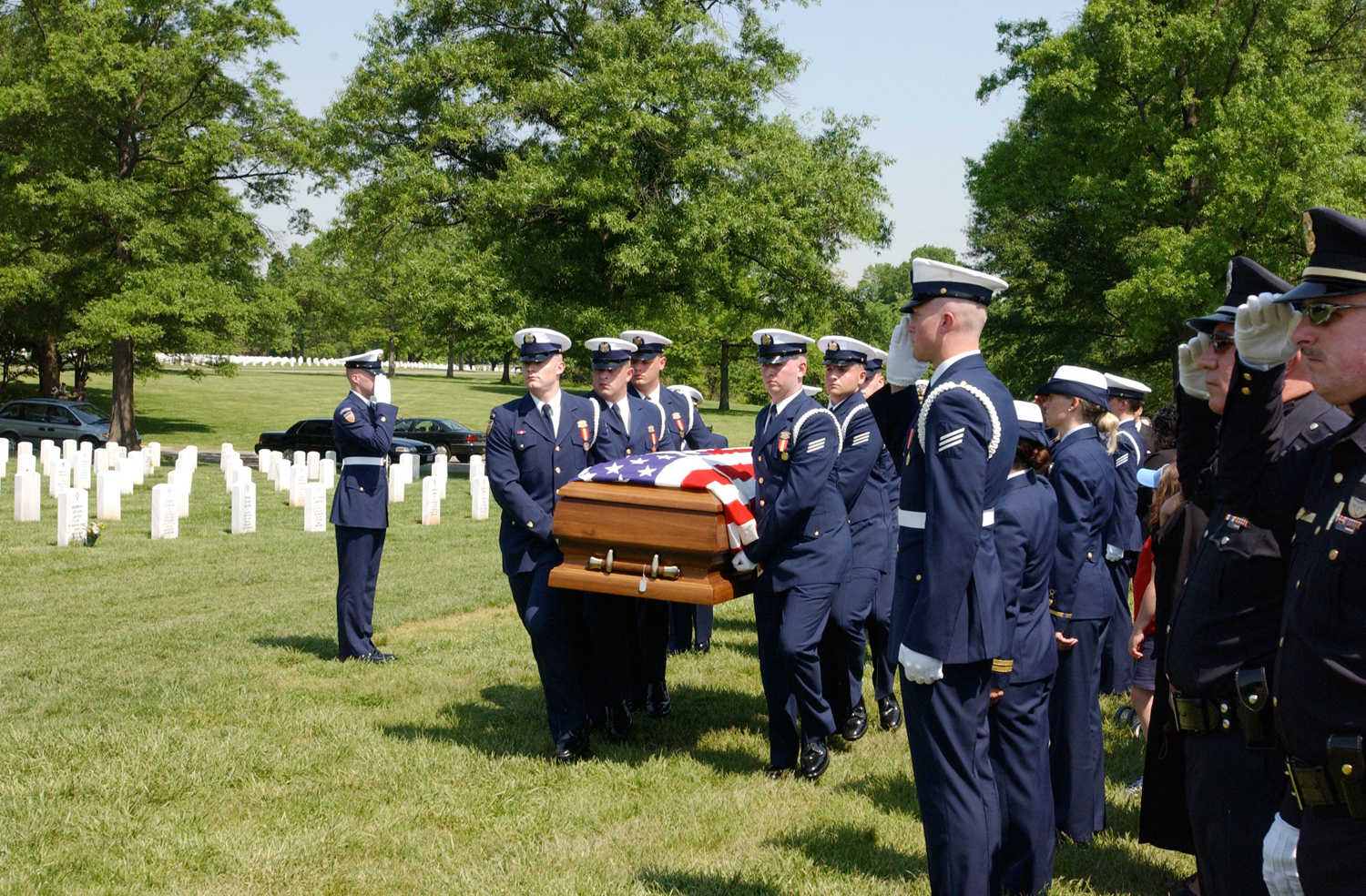
Pallbearers carry Bruckenthal's casket during his funeral at Arlington National Cemetery in May 2004.

On April 24, 2004, Bruckenthal and two U.S. Navy sailors were killed while intercepting a waterborne suicide attack on the Khawr Al Amaya Oil Terminal off the coast of Iraq in the northern Persian Gulf.

An account of the attack was included the May 2004 issue of U.S. Coast Guard Reservist magazine:

In the early evening hours of April 24, a dhow (a lateen-rigged Arabian vessel) approached an oil terminal in the Persian Gulf. Bruckenthal, trained as both a boarding team member and boarding officer, was accompanied by one other Coast Guardsman and five sailors from the United States Navy. The group boarded a rigid hull inflatable boat (RHIB), taking off in pursuit. As the crew was poised to board the dhow, an explosion was detonated. Two Navy petty officers also died as a result of the waterborne attack: PO1 Michael J. Pernaselli, 27, of Monroe, N.Y., and PO2 Christopher E. Watts, 28, of Knoxville, Tenn. Injured were three Navy sailors and BM3 Joseph T. Ruggiero, USCG, 23, from Revere, Mass., who received the Purple Heart.

Abu-Musab al-Zarqawi of al-Qaeda in Iraq claimed responsibility for the attack.

Bruckenthal was posthumously awarded the Bronze Star Medal with Combat Distinguishing Device and the Purple Heart, and the Global War on Terrorism Expeditionary Medal. He is buried at Arlington National Cemetery.

== Awards and decorations ==
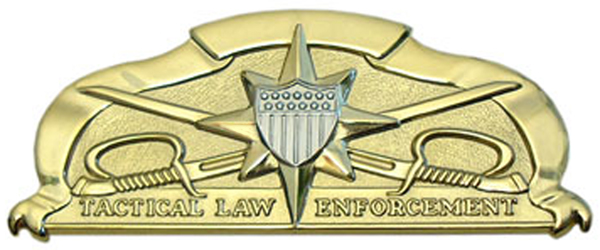

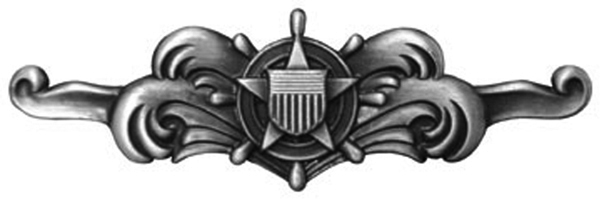

== Personal life ==
In 2001, Bruckenthal met his future wife, Pattie, while serving at U.S. Coast Guard Station Neah Bay. Pattie was a university student studying the Makah Indian tribe when Bruckenthal gave the students a tour of the station. Bruckenthal is survived by his wife, Pattie, and his daughter, Harper Natalie Bruckenthal, who was born after his death.

== Legacy ==
He is the first U.S. Coast Guardsman to be killed in action in military conflict since the Vietnam War. Bruckenthal's death is noted in an article listing Jewish U.S. service members killed in Iraq.

The Unaccompanied Personnel Housing building at Coast Guard Station Montauk and Training Center Cape May, is named in honor of Bruckenthal. He served as a fireman on USCGC Point Wells, which was homeported in Montauk, New York.

On April 24, 2014, the Commandant of the Coast Guard, Admiral Robert Papp, announced that the 28th Sentinel-class cutter would be named after Bruckenthal. The Coast Guard commissioned the fast response cutter, USCGC Nathan Bruckenthal, in Alexandria, Virginia in honor of Bruckenthal.

== Notes ==
=== References cited ===
- Lagan, Christopher (24 April 2014). "Coast Guard to name cutter for DC3 Nathan Bruckenthal". Coast Guard Compass: Official Blog of the U.S. Coast Guard. U.S. Coast Guard.
- O'Donnell, Michelle (May 8, 2004). "Long Island Native, Killed in Iraq, Is Buried in Arlington". Archives. The New York Times.
- Silverstein, Judy L. "A Coast Guard Hero is Laid to Rest..." (PDF). U.S. Coast Guard Reservist Magazine. Vol. 51, Issue 5: U.S. Coast Guard. pp. 14–16.
- "Nathan Bruckenthal". Our Military Heroes. U.S. Department of Defense. Archived from the original on 26 April 2014.
