= Coast Guard Station Montauk =

US Coast Guard station in New York

Coordinates: 41°04′21.5″N 71°56′04.5″W

- Part of First Coast Guard District
- Montauk, New York
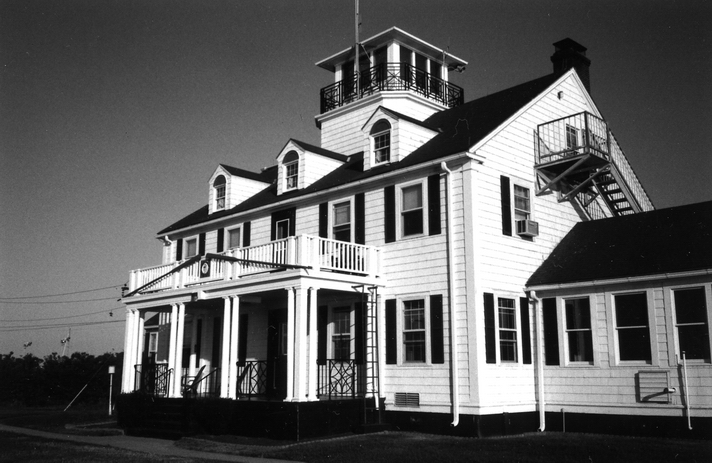
- USCG Station Montauk

Site information
- Type: Coast Guard Station
- Controlled by: United States Coast Guard

Site history
- In use: October 1, 1955 - present

U.S. Coast Guard Station Montauk is located on the easternmost end of Long Island in Montauk, New York. Station Montauk was officially opened on October 1, 1955 and has remained an active Search and Rescue and Law Enforcement unit. Today the station is one of eight small boat units that are a part of Sector Long Island Sound. Station Montauk is made up of active duty, reserve, and auxiliary personnel to maintain watch over the south shore of Long Island and Long Island Sound.

== History ==
Many of the old Lifesaving Service Stations converted to Coast Guard use along the south coast of Long Island had been closed down by 1950, some of which had been destroyed by the Great Hurricane of 1938 or closed after World War II. During the decades of the 1940s and 1950s, two stations provided rescue coverage for the East End: Ditch Plains and Napeaque. By 1955, Coast Guard operations on the south fork had become centralized with the establishment of the new station on Star Island.

Instead of building a new structure, the station at Napeague was closed and moved by barge to Lake Montauk, an operation that took six months. While en route by barge from Napeague Bay, the station was blown onto a sand bar by a winter storm. There the barge remained for two months while tugs tried to free her and in July 1954 the voyage of Montauk Station ended. The building arrived in Lake Montauk after a half year odyssey. Another year of work lay ahead to mount the building on a foundation and construct workshops and a large pier. On October 1, 1955 Montauk Station was commissioned as an active unit of Moriches Group, which included Shinnecock and Moriches stations.

Unfortunately, the Star Island facility had not yet been built when one of the worst boating tragedies in recent local history struck the Montauk area. This incident was the disastrous foundering of the fishing vessel Pelican on September 1, 1951. Patrol craft were not assigned to the Montauk area on a permanent basis until the 82-foot (25 m) cutter Point Wells was stationed there in 1962. During the summer of 1979, a trawler brought back to Star Island a live, but undetonated depth charge in its net. The entire island was evacuated when Suffolk County Police bomb squad and United States Navy Demolitions experts from New Jersey defused this hot potato. Regular law enforcement patrols have been part of the station’s mission since 1978. In October 1978, Montauk’s Cutter Point Wells made a large drug bust when she seized seven tons of marijuana aboard the 70-foot (21 m) sailing vessel Scott Bader off Gardiners Island. On January 24, 2001, the Point Wells was replaced by the 87-foot (27 m) Marine Protector Class Coastal Patrol Boat Ridley.

On September 30, 2005, the unaccompanied personnel housing at Coast Guard Station Montauk was dedicated to the memory of Petty Officer 3rd Class Nathan B. Bruckenthal, the only Coast Guardsman killed in action since the Vietnam War, who was killed off the coast of Iraq. Bruckenthal had served on the Cutter Point Wells when he first entered the Coast Guard.
