= Seraj-class speedboat =

Military speed boat

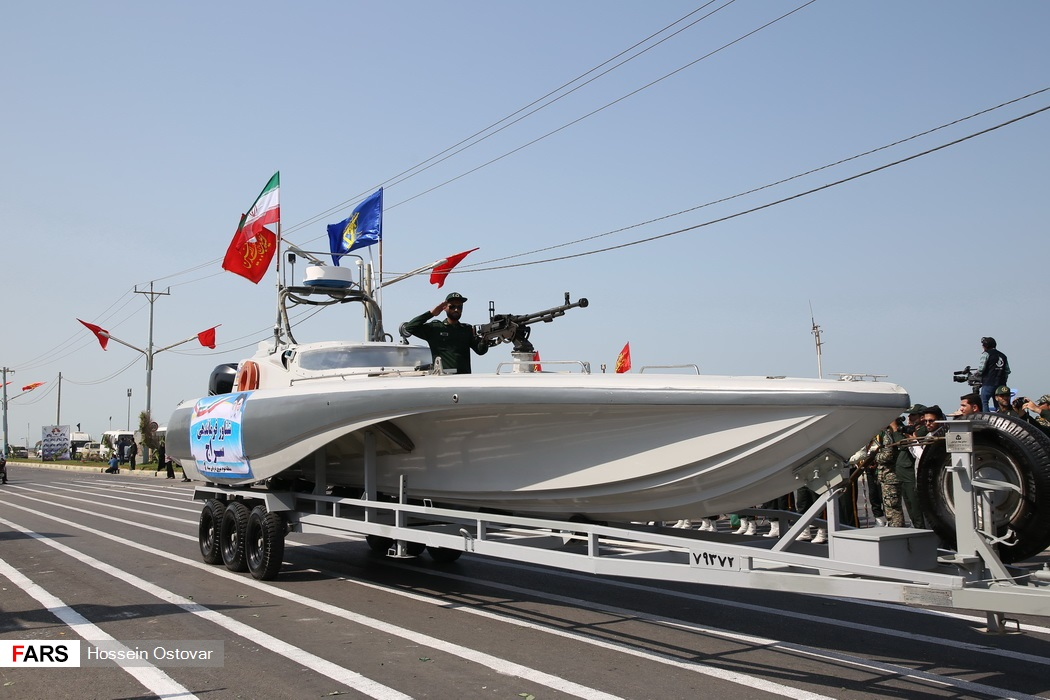

Class overview
- Operators: Navy of the Islamic Revolutionary Guard Corps

General characteristics
- Type: Fast patrol boat
- Speed: 75 knots (139 km/h)
- Armament: 1 × 12.7 mm machine gun; 1 × 107 mm 12-barelled MRL

Seraj-1 is a military speed boat that is used by Iran Revolutionary Guard Corps. It is based on the British made Bradstone Challenger, a Bladerunner 51, which holds the record for the fastest circumnavigation of Britain. Militarized speed boats have been the core of the Iranian military doctrine since their commanders believe that speed boats can counter the USA's massive warships.

== History ==
Sales of Bladerunner 51 were blocked to Iran by the west; however, in 2009, Iran managed to obtain one from a South African arms dealer. Iran created its militarized version of Bladerunner 51, named Seraj-1, in 2010. The designer of Bladerunner, Lorne Campbell, expressed his frustration that Iran had copied his design. Commander of IRGC Naval Force, Rear Admiral Ali Fadavi said that the Seraj-1 will be mass-produced from March 2011 to March 2012. Fadavi has also announced that Iran's navy aims to increase the speed of the militarized boats to 80–85 knots in the near future, and even up to 100 knots thereafter. These planned speed boats would most probably be named Seraj-2, Seraj-3 etc., since boats with that speed and the stability to carry weapons would depend on the Seraj-1 design.

== Specification ==
Defence minister Ahmad Vahidi has stated that "Seraj Anwer with a fiberglass bodywork, can shoot rockets and it is equipped with an electronic navigation system." Seraj Anwer also possesses radar-evading capabilities. The Seraj Anwer is equipped with a 107 mm MRLS and bow-mounted DShK 12.7 mm HMG. An advantage of the Seraj Anwer is that, just like the Bladerunner 51, it is very stable at high speeds in rough seas, thereby creating a stable platform to fire weapons. Consequently, Ahmad Vahidi described the Seraj Anwer as a "vessel (which) is a fast and offensive rocket launcher designed for regions with tropical weather". As it is based on the Bladerunner 51, the Seraj-1 is probably capable of speeds between 55 knots (63 mph) and 72 knots (83 mph).
