= USCGC Nathan Bruckenthal =

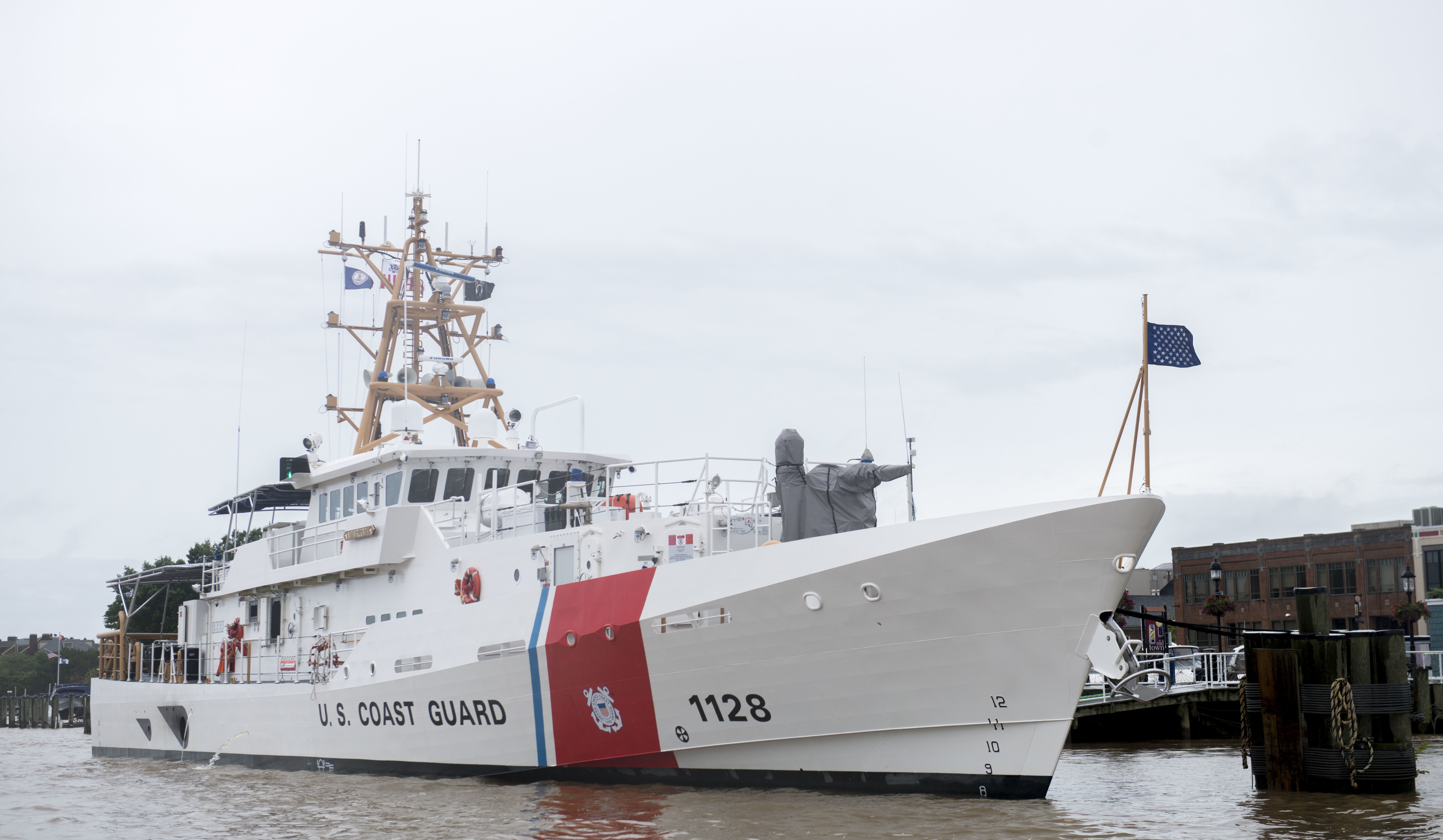

History
- Namesake: Nathan Bruckenthal
- Builder: Bollinger Shipyards
- Commissioned: July 25, 2018
- Status: Active

General characteristics
- Class & type: Sentinel cutter
- Displacement: 353 long tons (359 t)
- Length: 154 feet (47 m)
- Beam: 25 feet (7.6 m)
- Propulsion: 2 × 4,300 kW (5,800 shp) MTU diesel engines; 1 × 75 kW (101 shp) bow thruster
- Speed: 28 knots (52 km/h; 32 mph)
- Range: 2,500 nautical miles (4,600 km; 2,900 mi)
- Endurance: 5 days
- Boats & landing craft carried: 1 × Cutter Boat – Over the Horizon – Jet-drive
- Complement: 4 officers, 20 crew
- Sensors & processing systems: L-3 C4ISR suite; AN/SPS-78 surface search and navigation radar; AN/SPS-50 surface search radar; RADA RPS-42 MHR air search radar; AN/APX-123(V)1 IFF (ship automation provided by MTU Callosum)
- Armament: 1 × Mk 38 Mod 2 25 mm Machine Gun System (and 4 × crew-served Browning M2 machine guns on some cutters)

USCGC Nathan Bruckenthal (WPC-1128) is a United States Coast Guard Fast Response Cutter (FRC) of the Sentinel class.

Commissioned July 25, 2018 and is the 28th of the series. USCGC Nathan Bruckenthal is stationed in Atlantic Beach, North Carolina, in the Coast Guard's Fifth District. From South Carolina to New Jersey, the ship's patrol area will encompass 156,000 square miles (400,000 km^{2}) of ocean, including several major mid-Atlantic ports and Washington, D. C.

== Namesake ==
Named after Damage Controlman 3rd class Nathan Bruckenthal, killed in action on April 24, 2004. Bruckenthal and two U.S. Navy sailors were killed while intercepting a waterborne suicide attack on an offshore oil terminal off the coast of Iraq in the northern Persian Gulf. Bruckenthal was posthumously awarded the Bronze Star Medal with Combat Distinguishing Device and the Purple Heart for his actions.

== See also ==
- Patrol Forces Southwest Asia
