= Khor Al Amaya Oil Terminal =

Oil port in Iraq

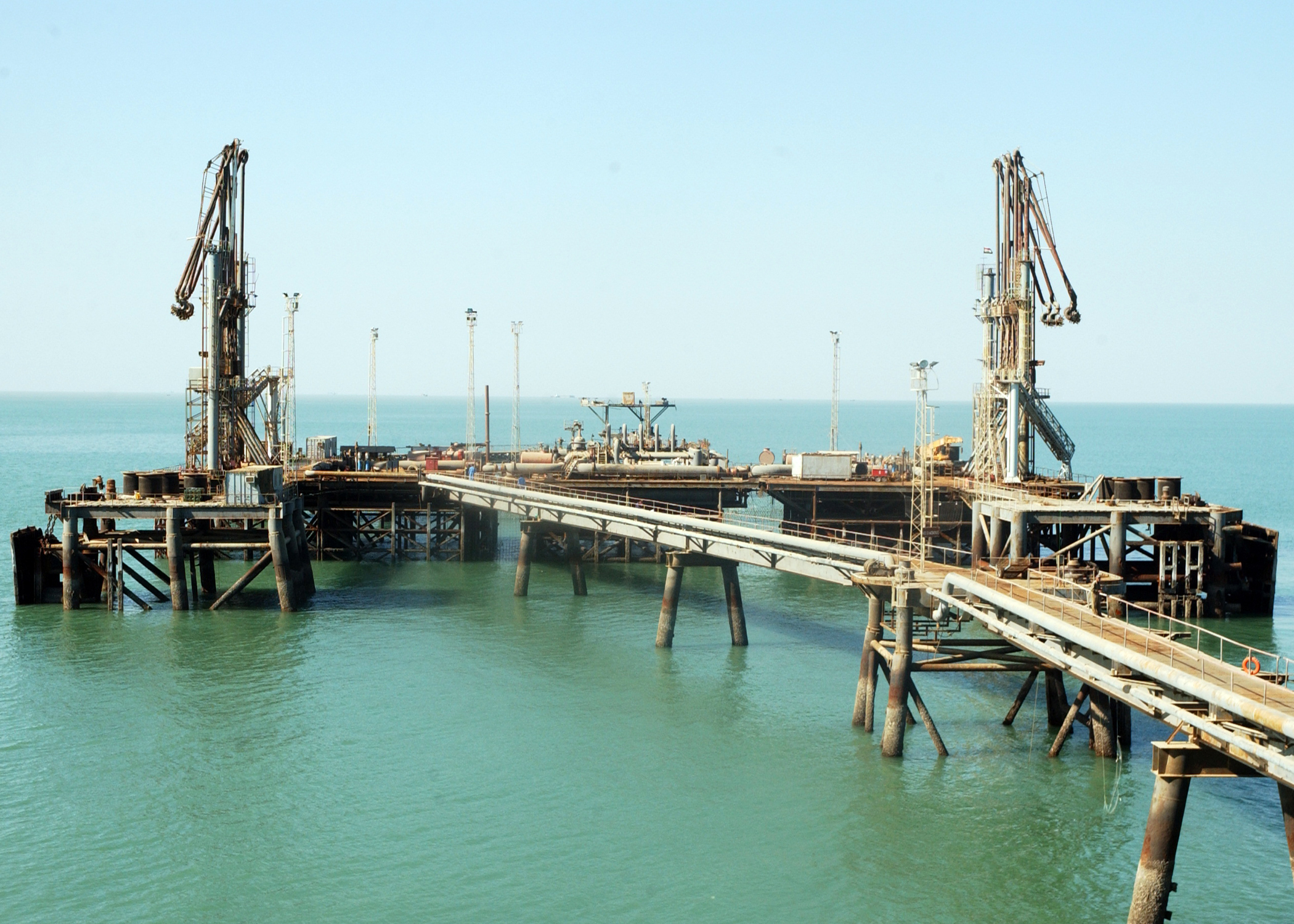
Khawr Al Amaya Oil Terminal on 11 Nov. 2005

Khor Al Amaya Oil Terminal is an Iraqi oil port. It lies southeast of the Al Faw peninsula in the Persian Gulf. Khawr Al Amaya Oil Terminal is commonly referred to as "KAAOT" and it, along with its sister terminal, the Al Basrah Oil Terminal or "ABOT", provides platforms from which a large majority of Iraq's oil can be exported. ABOT and KAAOT are major players in Iraq's eventual economic stability.

== See also ==
- List of ports in Iraq
