= National Navy of Uruguay =

- Armada Nacional del Uruguay
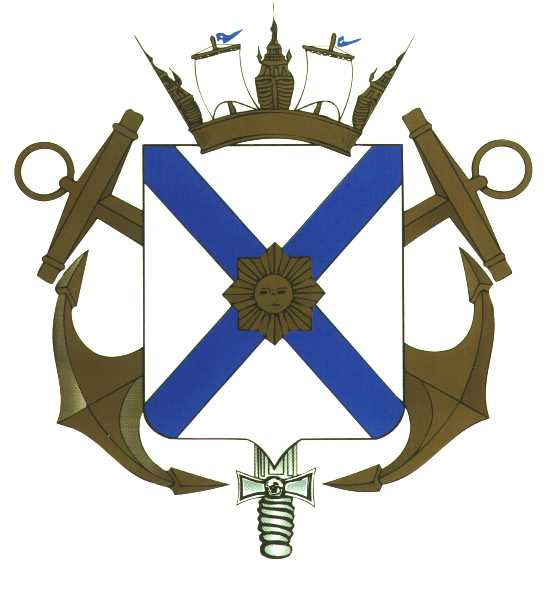
- Founded: 15 November 1817
- Country: Uruguay
- Branch: Navy
- Role: "The National Navy, as an integral member of the Armed Forces, shares its mission to defend the Constitution and the laws of the state, its territorial integrity and the exercise of its authority and maritime police, in order to contribute to the defense of the honor, independence and peace of the Republic."
- Size: abt. 5,700 personnel
- Garrison/HQ: Rambla 25 de Agosto de 1825, Montevideo
- Mottos: Llegar, Luchar, Vencer Siempre "To arrive. To fight. To win. Always."
- Anniversaries: 15 November: Navy Day

Commanders
- Current commander: Adm. José Luis Elizondo

Insignia
- Naval Jack

Aircraft flown
- Helicopter: HC.2-Mk 2
- Patrol: Beech 200T
- Trainer: T-34C

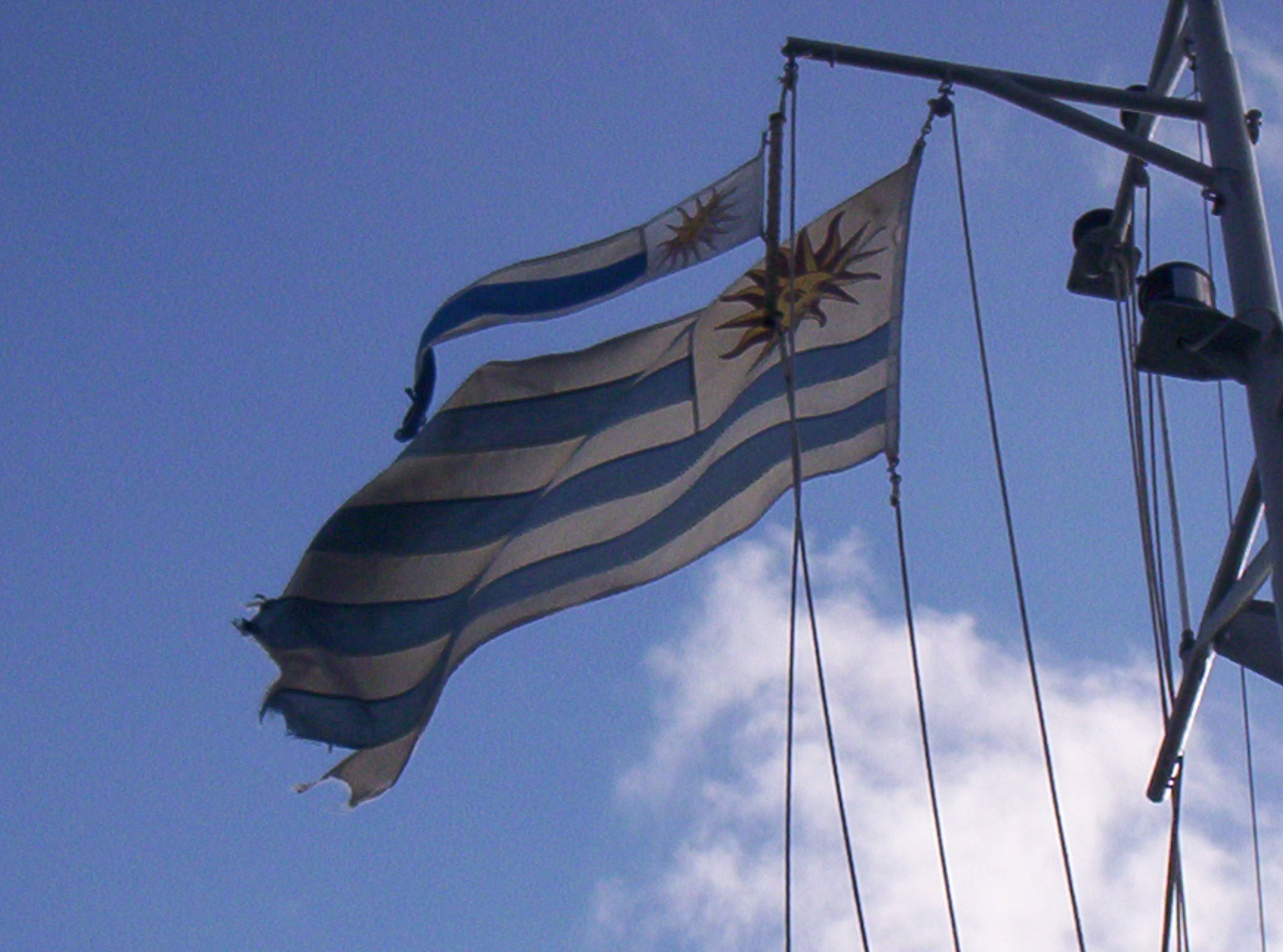
Uruguay flag and pennant on the ROU 21 Sirius

The National Navy of Uruguay (Spanish: Armada Nacional del Uruguay) is a branch of the Armed Forces of Uruguay under the direction of the Ministry of National Defense and the commander in chief of the Navy (Comandante en Jefe de la Armada or COMAR).

== History ==
=== Independence ===
Under the late Spanish Empire, Montevideo became the main naval base (Real Apostadero de Marina) for the South Atlantic, with authority over the Argentine coast, Fernando Po, and the Falklands. The arrival of 100 ships under Viceroy Pedro de Cevallos in 1777 was the beginning of the city's prosperity.

The Uruguayan navy, however, dates its origin from General Artigas's letter of marque on 15 November 1817, which authorized his forces to plunder Portuguese shipping wherever they found it. Portuguese forces from Brazil had invaded Uruguay (then known as Banda Oriental) in August 1816. Under the nominal leadership of the Pedro Campbell, the Irish "Gaucho Admiral", around 50 privateer schooners and brigs (including República Oriental, Fortuna, Valiente, Temerario, and Intrépido) were able to capture more than 200 enemy vessels as far off as Madagascar, Spain, and the Antilles.

=== Early Republic ===
Following independence, a navy was established under Colonel Pablo Zufriategui, a veteran of Artigas's campaigns and the 33 Easterners. As Captain of Ports (Capitán General de Puertos), he fought smuggling and in 1832 Zufriategui led the first sovereign engagement when the schooner Aguila chased off the pirate ship Exquisit from Uruguayan waters.

Although the force remained too small to play a decisive role in the Great War, it is notable that command of the small fleet was personally assumed by Giuseppe Garibaldi, who captured Colonia del Sacramento, Isla Martín García, and Gualeguaychú. The flagship during this period was the corvette Sarandí, named after an important battle in the war for independence.

The first specially fitted warships were the gunboats General Rivera, General Artigas, and General Suárez. The first was assembled in Uruguay by the Academy of Arts & Crafts (Escuela de Artes y Oficios) and commissioned in April 1884; the second was constructed in Trieste, then part of Austria-Hungary, and commissioned in December 1884; the last was the 23-year-old French gunboat Tactique, acquired in 1886. General Rivera was the first ship of the Navy to pass the Strait of Magellan.

=== Modern era ===
Just prior to World War I, President Claudio Williman devoted considerable effort and expense to modernizing the navy, viewing it as demanded for Uruguay's "sovereignty and honor." After false starts in 1817, 1863, and 1874, the Uruguay Naval Academy (Escuela Naval) was eventually established in December 1907. New ships included the gunboat Dieciocho de Julio (constructed in the UK in 1889), the cruiser Montevideo (the ex-Italian cruiser Dogali), the transport Maldonado (constructed in Germany in 1886 and soon renamed Barón de Río Branco for its tasks for the Commission on the Limits of the Merín Lagoon), the steamer Vanguardia, and the courier Oriental. The torpedo gunboat Uruguay was constructed to order in Germany and commissioned August 1910. Also in 1910, the government acquired the Cibils-Jackson shipyard, renaming it the National Dock. These advances were then sabotaged by funding cutbacks throughout the 1920s that left the navy poorly maintained.

In June 1916, the tug Instituto de Pesca Nº1 - manned by Navy servicemen - led the second failed attempt to rescue the men of Shackleton's expedition from Elephant Island.

In 1925, the Fleet Aeronautics Service (Servicio de Aeronáutica de la Armada) was created under Captain Atilio Frigerio, the first Uruguayan pilot to obtain the brevet of Military Pilot (Aviano, Italy, 1912). The first planes, however, did not arrive until 1930.

In 1934, the first Naval Act (Ley Orgánica de la Armada) created the Inspectorate of the Navy (Inspección General de Marina), freeing the Navy from direct subordination to the Army. The next year, three patrol boats ordered from Cantieri Navali Riuniti in Genoa arrived. The Paysandú, Salto, and Río Negro having served for about 30 years, were decommissioned, and then were brought back into service in the 1990s.

=== World War II ===
In December 1939, the Río de la Plata saw the first major naval engagement of World War II when the German pocket battleship Admiral Graf Spee faced the cruisers HMS Ajax, Achilles, and Exeter and then fled into Montevideo harbor during the Battle of the River Plate. Although Uruguay was officially neutral, her pro-British sentiment allowed the Royal Navy to carry out a highly successful disinformation campaign that ended in the German scuttling of the ship.

In 1940, La Paloma's Naval Base (Base Naval de la Paloma) was established. The same year, Uruguay introduced conscription and the Navy established the battalions Zapicán and Honor y Patria as part of its Reserve Fleet. The next year, the Navy created the Naval War School (Escuela de Guerra Naval) to improve its officers' training.

Although Uruguay did not officially join the Allies until 15 February 1945, it was involved in assisting the convoy effort. This involved the confiscation of two Italian and two Occupied Danish freighters in Montevideo, which were manned by the Navy and rechristened Montevideo, Maldonado, Rocha and Colonia. Montevideo was incidentally sunk by the Italian submarine Enrico Tazzoli in March 1942, which prompted Uruguay to seize the German freighter Tacoma. In August 1942, Maldonado was sunk after its commander was taken prisoner by the German submarine U-510. Following this incidents, Uruguay leased a number of its boats to the US Navy and received in 1944 the anti-submarine warfare (ASW)-capable corvette Maldonado.

The Fleet Aeronautics Service received six Kingfisher seaplanes from the United States in 1942 and established Laguna del Sauce Aeronaval Base (Base Aeronaval No.2 de Laguna del Sauce) in 1947.

=== Cold War ===
Following World War II, the beginning of the Cold War saw the Inter-American Treaty of Reciprocal Assistance signed in Rio de Janeiro, which provided for "Hemispheric defense" and required signatory states to work to improve and coordinate their naval forces. Between 1949 and 1952, the FAS received sixteen TBM Avenger torpedo bombers, three SNJ Texan trainers, and twelve F6F Hellcat fighters. More, in 1952, the surface fleet received the destroyer escorts Uruguay and Artigas and, in 1953, the frigate Montevideo.

In 1955, the Coast Guard received three motor launches: PS-1, PS-2, and PS-3. In May 1959, PS-2 stood out in the rescue of the crew of the Uruguayan freighter Pietrina, stranded on the English Bank, a sandbar off Montevideo.

In 1957, the UNITAS joint exercises began between the United States and the navies of Latin America. The basic training was oriented towards protection of marine lines of trade and communication, focusing on escort and ASW exercises. With the aim of improving the navy's range and support capability, the oiler Presidente Oribe was purchased in 1962; ten years later, the second oiler Presidente Rivera; and in 1978, Juan Antonio Lavalleja.

From 1960 to 1962, naval officers on Alférez Cámpora circumnavigated the globe.

In 1965, three S2A Tracker ASW planes were received; in 1966, the minesweepers Cte. Pedro Campbell and Montevideo; in 1969, the tender Hurrican; in 1970, the minesweepers Rio Negro and Maldonado. In 1973, the destroyer 18 de Julio replaced Montevideo.

The present Uruguayan Marine Corps (formerly Cuerpo de Fusileros Navales today the Comando de Infantería de Marina) was established in 1972.

In 1978, refit works were completed to the ROU 20 Capitan Miranda that was converted it into a training ship and sailing school. Following graduation from the Naval Academy, cadets embark on a cruise of the world that functions as a good-will tour for Uruguay.

=== Current ===
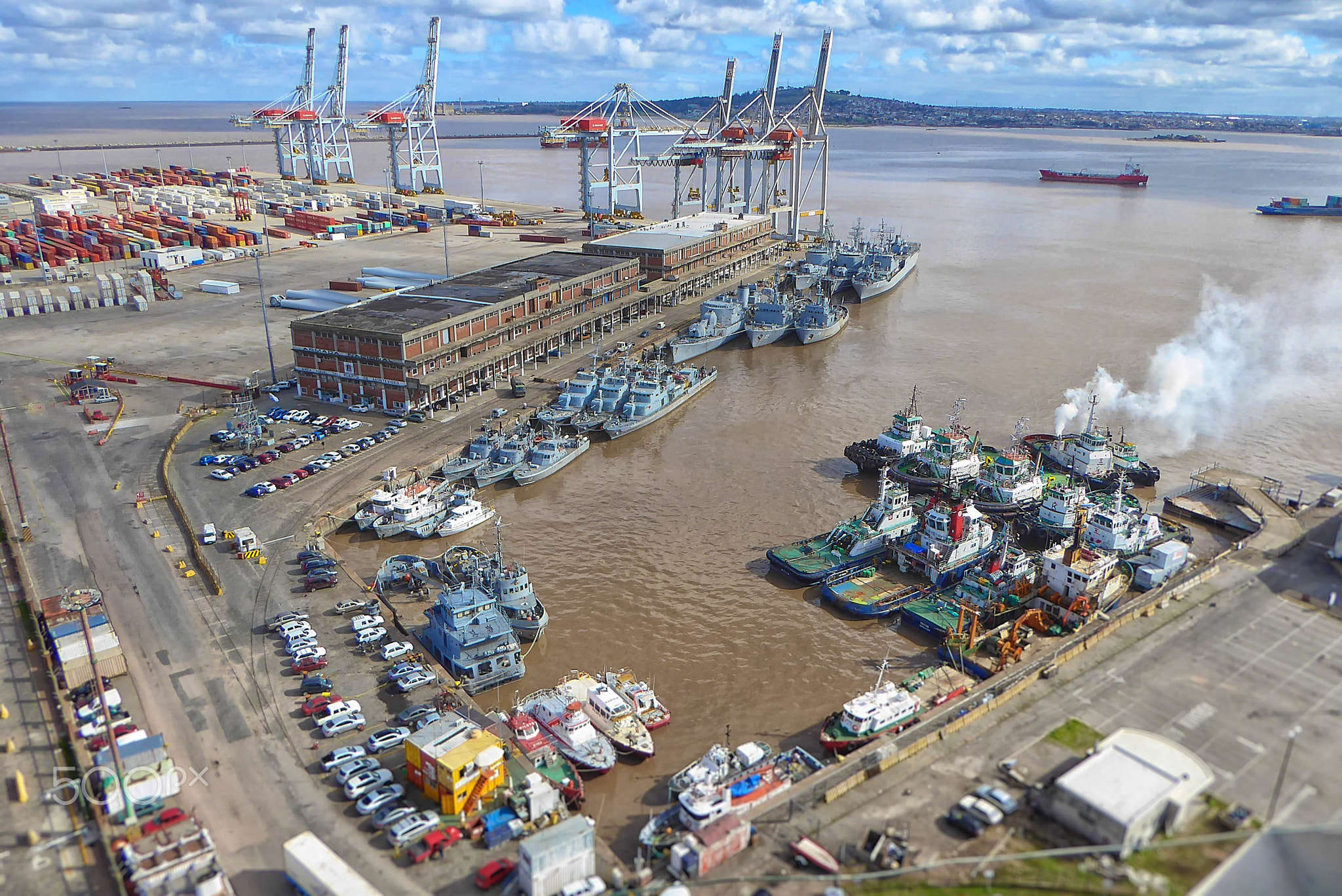
Aerial view of part of the port of Montevideo with some ships of the Uruguayan Navy, 2016.

In 1981, three French-designed Vigilante-class patrol boats arrive for the Coast Guard – 15 de Noviembre, 25 de Agosto, and Comodoro Coe – but it is discovered that their upkeep is considerably more expensive than promised, and the ships are quite unsuited for conditions in the Rio de la Plata. An attempt to sell them in 1995 found no buyers, however, and so the ships have remained in active service.

In 1988, the Navy acquired a new ship to replace its previous oilers, christened Presidente Rivera.

From 1989 to 1991, three Commandant Riviere-class frigates are purchased from France. These were christened ROU 02 General Artigas, ROU 01 Uruguay, and ROU 03 Montevideo. These too ran into problems, particularly with upkeep, and General Artigas was removed from service. In a decision between the two remaining ships, Uruguay was decommissioned and Montevideo received repairs and refurbishment.

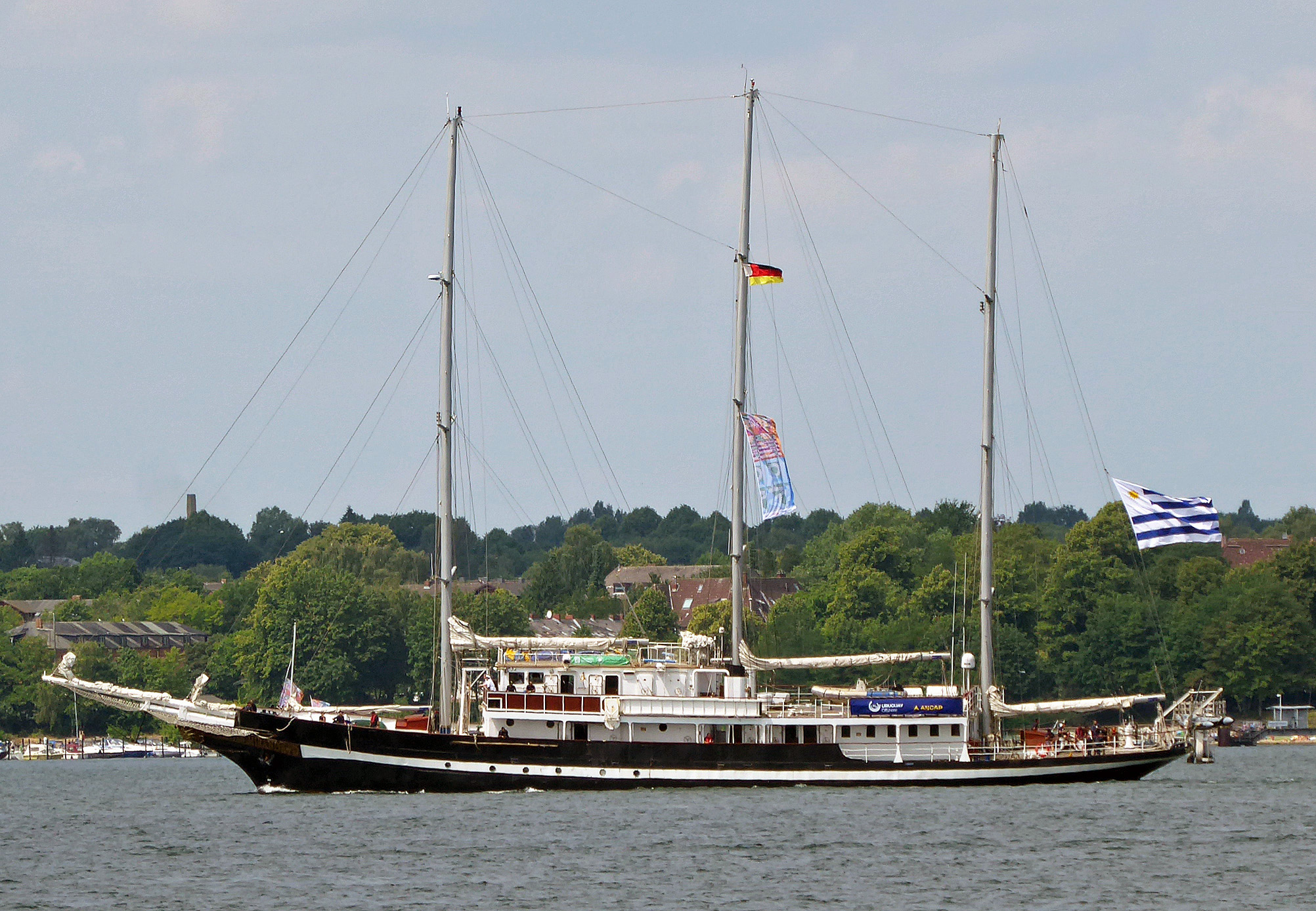
Schooner ROU Capitán Miranda, training ship of the Uruguayan navy

Following the fall of Communism, a number of former East German Volksmarine ships were purchased from the new government. In 1991, the Navy received the minesweepers ROU 31 Temerario, ROU 32 Valiente, ROU 33 Fortuna, and ROU 34 Audaz. These were named after privateers of the independence era. Also in 1991, Otto von Guericke was purchased and converted into ROU 26 Vanguardia. In the early hours of 5 August 2000, Valiente sank after a collision with the Panamanian freighter Skyros, while on patrol off Cabo Polonio. Eleven crewmembers died or became missing in the disaster.

The Coast Guard received new ships from the United States, Colonia and Río Negro; and in 1999, nine boats of the 44 class from the same country.

The buoy tender Sirius was constructed in Montevideo at the National Dock, which also refitted the Portuguese Cte. Pedro Campbell and Uruguay.

At the end of 1998, the research ship Oyarvide was purchased from Germany for the purpose of studying and charting the Continental Shelf. It is hoped that the work will justify a redefinition of its boundaries that would approximately double Uruguay's marine exclusive economic zone to around 200,000 km^{2}.

== Organization ==
The National Navy is composed of about 5,700 personnel organized principally into four commands, each with its distinctive color for official functions.

- The General Corps (Cuerpo General or CG) under the administration of Fleet Command (Color: Black)
- The Coastal Corps (Cuerpo de Prefectura or CP) under the administration of the Coast Guard (Color: Gray)
- The Corps of Mechanical & Electrical Engineers (Cuerpo de Ingenieros de Máquinas y Electricidad or CIME) under the administration of the General Directorate of Naval Materiel (Color: Blue)
- The Corps of Provision & Administration (Cuerpo de Aprovisionamiento y Administración or CAA) under the administration of the General Directorate of Personnel (Color: White)

In addition, there are two General Services Corps (Servicios Generales or SS.GG.)

- The Auxiliary Corps (Cuerpo Auxiliar or CA) (Color: Purple) and
- The Specialists Corps (Cuerpo Especialista or CE) (Color: Green)

and the Naval Academy (Escuela Naval or ESNAL).

The National Navy also includes the Uruguayan Marine Corps and the National Naval Aviation Command.

The service is divided into four main sections:

- Fleet Command (Comando de la Flota or COMFLO),
- Coast Guard (Prefectura Nacional Naval or PRENA),
- Materiel Directorate (Dirección General de Material Naval or DIMAT), and
- Personnel Directorate (Dirección General de Personal Naval or DIPER).

The Fleet Command is in charge of most of the actual ships of the fleet, the marines, and the naval aviation bases and aircraft. The Coast Guard administers the modest Uruguayan merchant marine and naval registry. The Naval Materiel Directorate preserves and repairs naval equipment, in addition to administering the fleet arsenal and directing hydrological and meteorological study. The Personnel Directorate is concerned with human resources and particularly the administration of the Uruguayan Naval Academy.

In addition, the Fleet General Staff (Estado Mayor General de la Armada or ESMAY) assists the admiral in his administration. It oversees naval intelligence, strategic and tactical planning, logistics, liaison, and political lobbying on the Navy's behalf.

=== Naval ranks ===
==== Commissioned officer ranks ====
Rank group	General/flag officers		Senior officers			Junior officers
National Navy of Uruguay
National Navy of Uruguay	Almirante	Contraalmirante	Capitán de navío	Capitán de fragata	Capitán de corbeta	Teniente de navío	Alférez de navio	Alférez de fragata	Guardiamarina

==== Other ranks ====
Rank group	Senior NCOs			Junior NCOs		Enlisted
National Navy of Uruguay						No insignia
National Navy of Uruguay	Sub-oficial de cargo	Sub-oficial de primera	Sub-oficial de segunda	Cabo de primera	Cabo de segunda	Marinero de primera	Aprendiz

== Fleet ==
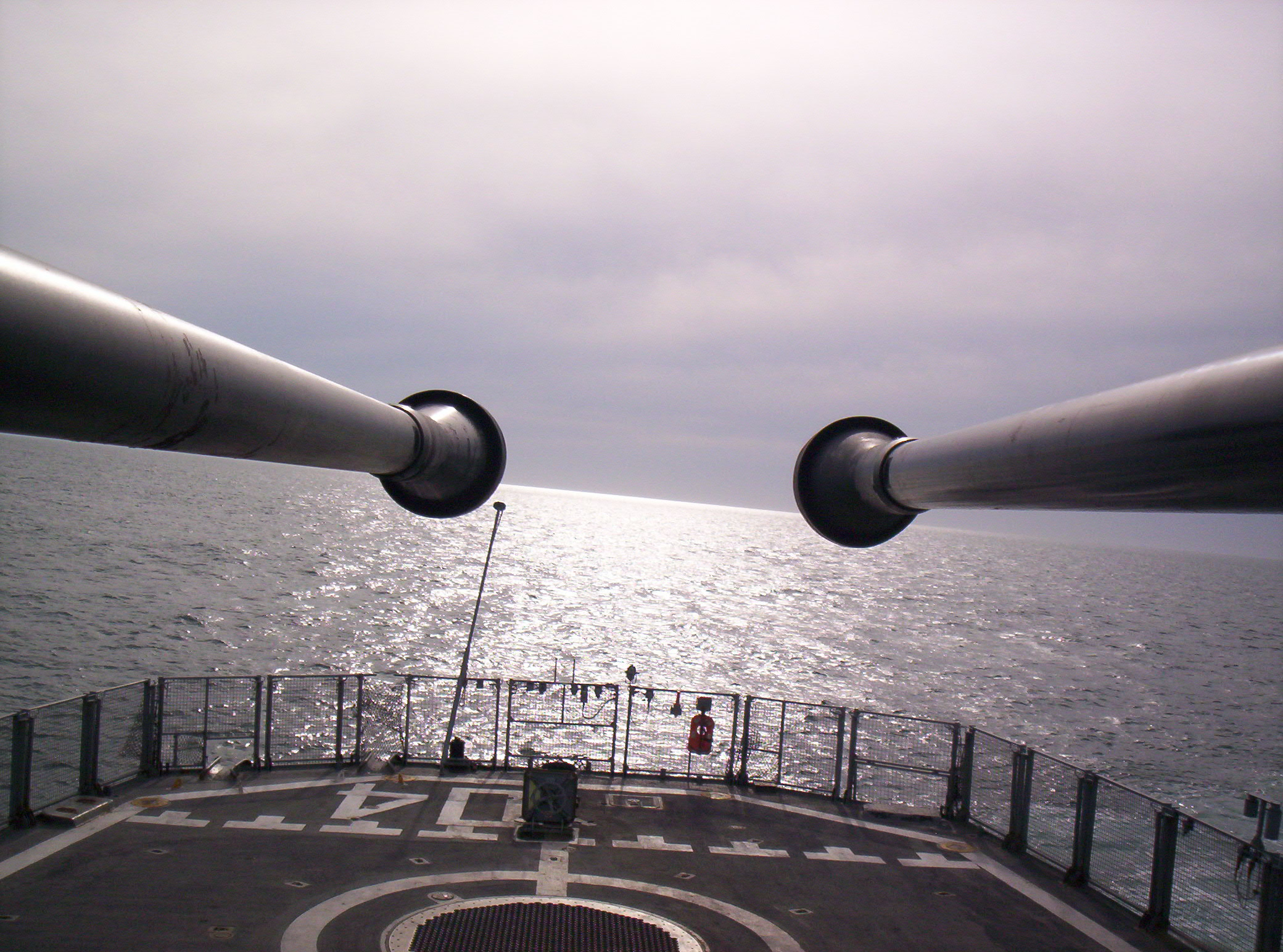
Stern of the ROU 04 General Artigas

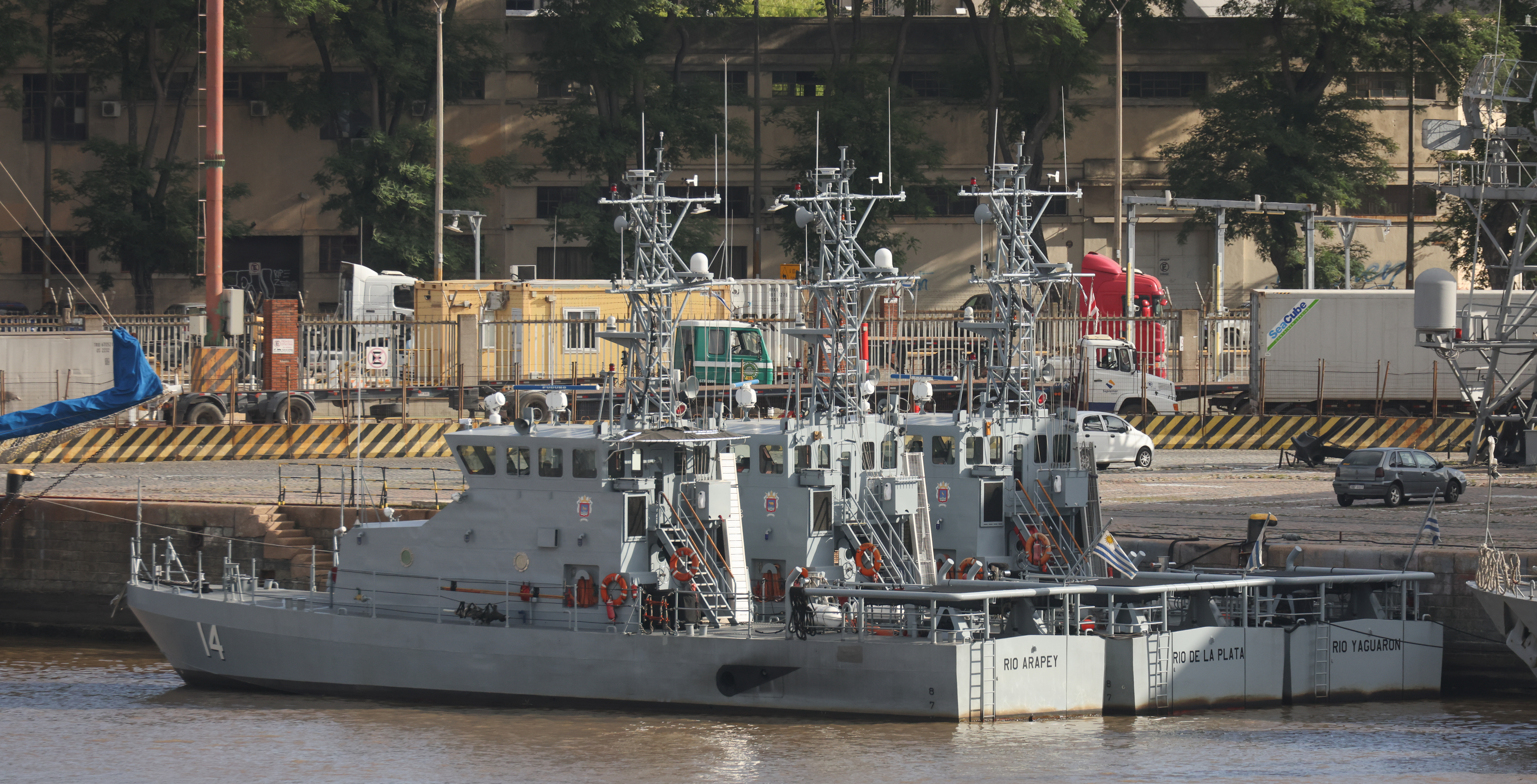
Uruguayan patrol boats in 2024.

The ship prefix for Uruguay is ROU (for República Oriental del Uruguay, the "Oriental Republic of Uruguay"). In addition to their ship name, government ships are numerically listed. This is a position and not an identification number: as ships are decommissioned and replaced, their previous numbers are reused by newer vessels.

The current fleet consists of:

Ship	Name	Class	Type	Commissioned	Notes
Escort Division
ROU 04	General Artigas	Lüneburg (E)	Replenishment oiler	6 Apr 2005	Refitted with helipad. Used for helicopter patrol & transport. Formerly German Freiburg (Germany)
Patrol Division
ROU 10	Huracán	Chamsuri (C)	Patrol boat	17 Jun 2024	Formerly PKM-318 (South Korea)
ROU 11	Río Negro	Cape (C)	Patrol boat	25 Jan 1990	Formerly USCGC Cape Horn (WPB-95322) (United States)
ROU 14	Río Arapey	Marine Protector (C)	Patrol boat	15 Dec 2021	Formerly USCGC Albacore (WPB-87309) (United States)
ROU 15	Río de la Plata	Marine Protector (C)	Patrol boat	15 Dec 2021	Formerly USCGC Cochito (WPB-87329) (United States)
ROU 16	Río Yaguarón	Marine Protector (C)	Patrol boat	15 Dec 2021	Formerly USCGC Gannet (WPB-87334) (United States)
Teaching Vessel
ROU 20	Capitán Miranda	Hydrographic	Schooner	28 Dec 1930	Spanish-built. Survey ship prior to 1978, now a training ship (Spain)
ESNAL	Bonanza	Oceanic sail boat	Schooner		training ship (Uruguay)
Auxiliary Ships Service
ROU 21	Sirius	Balizador	Buoy tender	12 May 1988	Built in Montevideo with assistance from Dutch Damen SY (Uruguay)
Service Division
ROU 23	Maldonado	Wangerooge (B)	Rescue-salvage ship	20 Nov 2002	Fitted for firefighting, hydrographic research. Formerly German Norderney (Germany)
ROU 26	Vanguardia	Piast	Rescue-salvage ship	18 Dec 1991	Formerly 570 Otto von Guericke, Volksmarine (East Germany)
ROU 27	Banco Ortiz	Type 270	Coastal tug	8 Nov 1991	Formerly East Germany tug 4 Zingst, Volksmarine, Y1655 Elbe,
Mining & Counter mining Division
ROU 31	Temerario	Kondor II	Minesweeper	11 Oct 1991	Formerly 89.242 Riesa, Volksmarine (East Germany)
ROU 34	Audaz	Kondor II	Minesweeper	11 Oct 1991	Formerly 89.245 Eisleben, Volksmarine (East Germany)
Search & Rescue
ROU 52	Isla Lobos	23.5m-class	Lifeboat	23 November 2018	Formerly Hannes Glogner, German Maritime Search and Rescue Service (Germany)
Research
ROU 22	Oyarvide	Research vessel	Research vessel	24 Sep 2024	Formerly NOAAS Mount Mitchell, survey vessel (United States)

Since 1997, the Uruguayan Naval Academy has also maintained the racing sloop Bonanza, a gift from the US Naval Academy at Annapolis. The Prefectura (Coast Guard) received in 2019 a donation of 4 Metal Shark Defiant 32 patrol boats from the USA.

== Uruguayan Naval Aviation ==
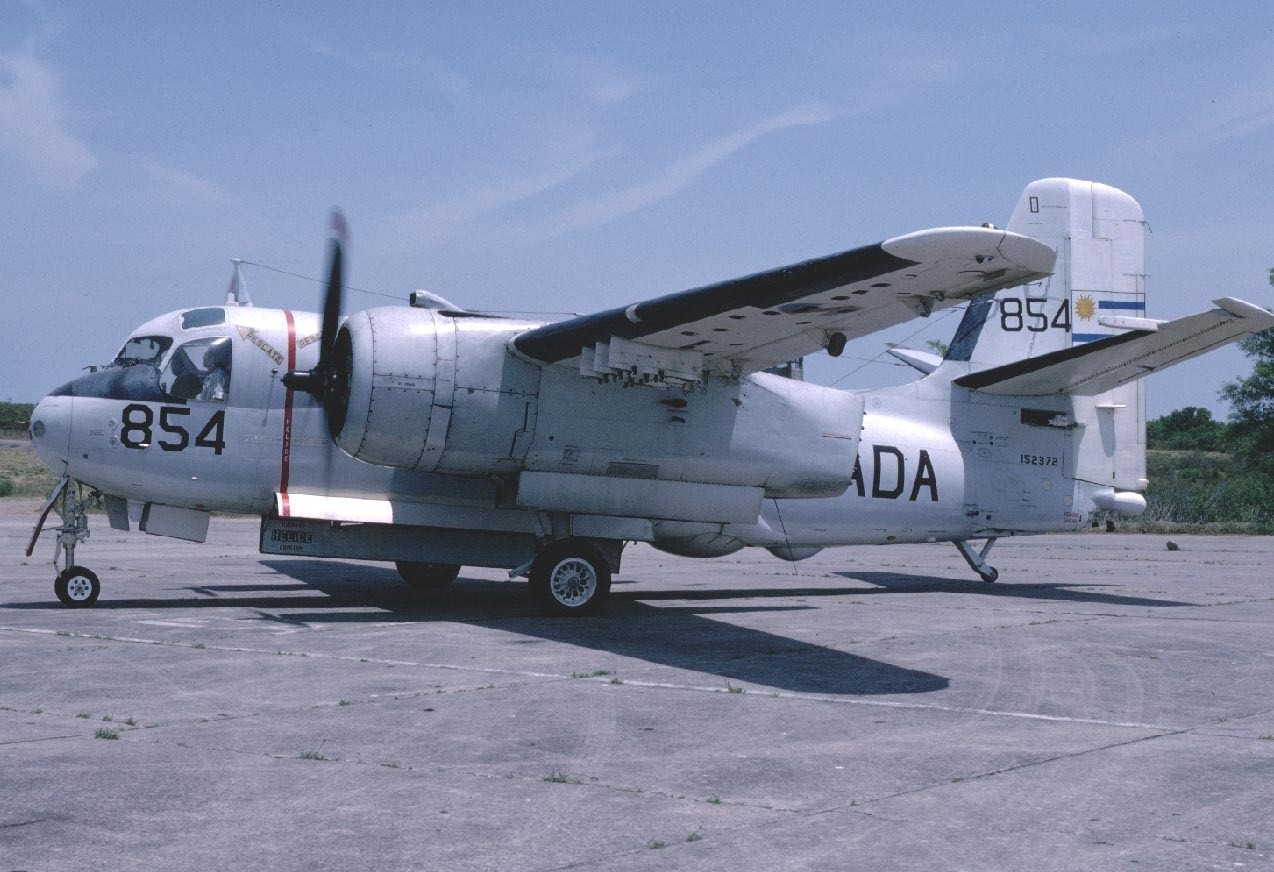
Uruguay Naval Aviation Grumman S-2G Tracker (G-121)

Uruguayan Naval Aviation (Aviación Naval Uruguaya or ANU) is the sub-branch of the National Navy for naval aircraft and aviation training. Naval aircraft use a new wing emblem instead of the traditional Artigas roundel like the Uruguayan Air Force for easier identification and use the Uruguayan National flag as fin flash. It was created as Aeronautic Service of the Fleet (Servicio de Aeronáutica de la Armada) on 7 February 1925, but didn't receive its first aircraft (two CANT 18 and one CANT 21) until 24 September 1930. On 12 June 1934, the Naval Air Base "Isla Libertad" in Montevideo's Bay was declared operational.

In 1942, Grumman J4F Widgeon, Vought OS2U Kingfisher and Fairchild PT-23A trainers were received from the US under Lend-Lease. The Naval Air Base Capitán de Corbeta (Corvette Captain) Carlos A. Curbelo at Laguna del Sauce was declared operational on 10 September 1947. During the years 1949 to 1957, a large supply of North American SNJ-4, Grumman Avenger, Grumman F6F Hellcat, and Martin Mariner aircraft were delivered. The force was renamed Naval Aviation (Aviación Naval) in 1951, and as Uruguayan Naval Aviation (Aviación Naval Uruguaya) in 1955.

The last F6Fs were retired in 1961; during the middle of the 1960s, most of the other planes in the inventory reached the end of their operational lives and were written off. In this decade the Beechcraft T-34 A, Beechcraft C-45, Grumman S-2A Tracker, Bell TH-13 and Sikorsky CH-34J were incorporated. Some more T-34A/B Mentors were exchanged from the Uruguayan Air Force for SNJ spare parts.

In 1979 nine North American T-28D Fennec and three C-45 were donated by the Argentinian Navy. Fennecs were used as a light attack platform until 2000. By 1980 one Bell 222 was bought for SAR operations plus one Beech B-200T for maritime surveillance. In 1982 three Turbo Mentor and three Grumman S-2G Tracker were acquired. Trackers were written off in 2001. One S-2G (ANU 854) is on reserve. Some of the CH-34Js were exchanged from Hi-Lift Helicopters for three Wessex Mk60. Also, several Bell 47G were incorporated from the civilian market.

During the 1990s a number of Westland Wessex HcMkII were also bought from Royal Navy and Royal Air Force surplus. By 2000 the last airworthy Fennecs, three Cessna 182 and two Piper Seneca were sold to private collectors. After failed negotiations about Catpass 250, Falcon 20 from US Coast Guard and IAI Westwind of Israel Defense Forces, two Handley Page Jetstream TMk 2 were incorporated from the Royal Navy for training and maritime patrol duties. They operated until 2010 due to a lack of spare parts for the Turbomeca Astazou XVI C2 turboprop powerplants. They are currently on reserve.

Six MBB Bo-105M were received from Germany in 2006, plus one Helibras Esquilo donated by the Brazilian government. Esquilo replaced Bell 47 as helicopter trainer. Since 2010 Uruguayan Navy has been interested in the acquisition of six Lockheed S-3 Viking used from USN stocks, but a shortage of funds are delaying any purchase. In 2013 was incorporated another Beechcraft Super King Air. Despite lack of funding, there are some plans for near future to incorporate a heavier maritime patrol platform like Beechcraft B 350ER, C-212-400 MP or some second hand CN-235 MP Persuader, Be-12 Mail or CL-215, a number of surplus Short S.312 Tucanos from Royal Navy or T-34C-1 Turbo Mentors from US Navy stocks and at least three helicopters for carried based operations, like some Bell 212 ASW, Bell 412EP or refurbished Westland SH-3 Sea King from Royal Navy surplus as a replacement of the declining Wessex fleet.

By 2018 the Bo-105M were no longer operative. They are being replaced by two AB-412 from Italian Coast Guard.

The small command w/Squadron Group (Grupo de Escuadrones) consists of 2 squadrons and 1 training school.

=== Current order of battle ===
Naval Aviation Academy (Escuela de Aviación Naval) Originally at Angel S Adami 1944-1947 Since then at Captain Carlos Curbelo Naval Air Base (2) at Laguna del Sauce

=== Current Equipment ===
Aircraft	Origin	Type	Variant	In service	Notes
Maritime patrol
Beechcraft Super King Air	United States	patrol	King Air 200	2	
Helicopter
Bell 412	United States	utility		2	1 on order
Trainer
ENAER T-35 Pillán	Chile	trainer			4 on order

=== Gallery ===
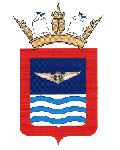
Coat of Arms

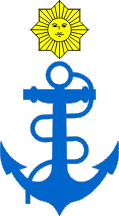
Wing Emblem

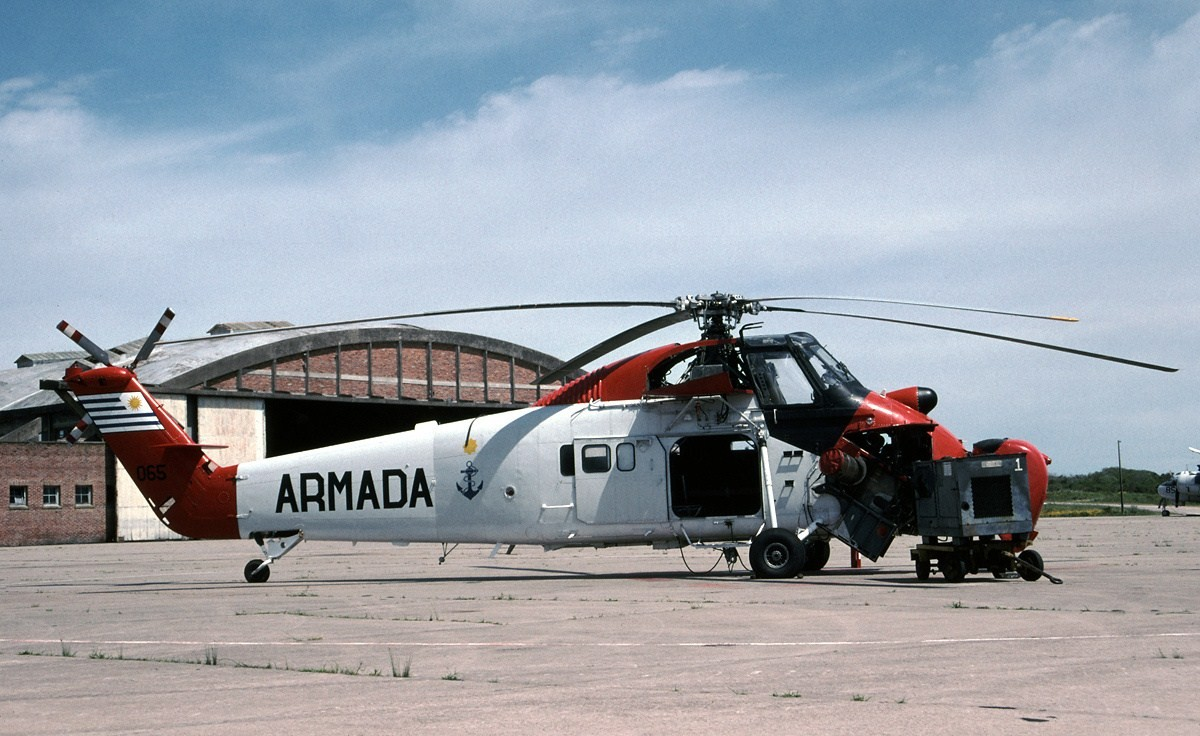
Westland Wessex Mk60

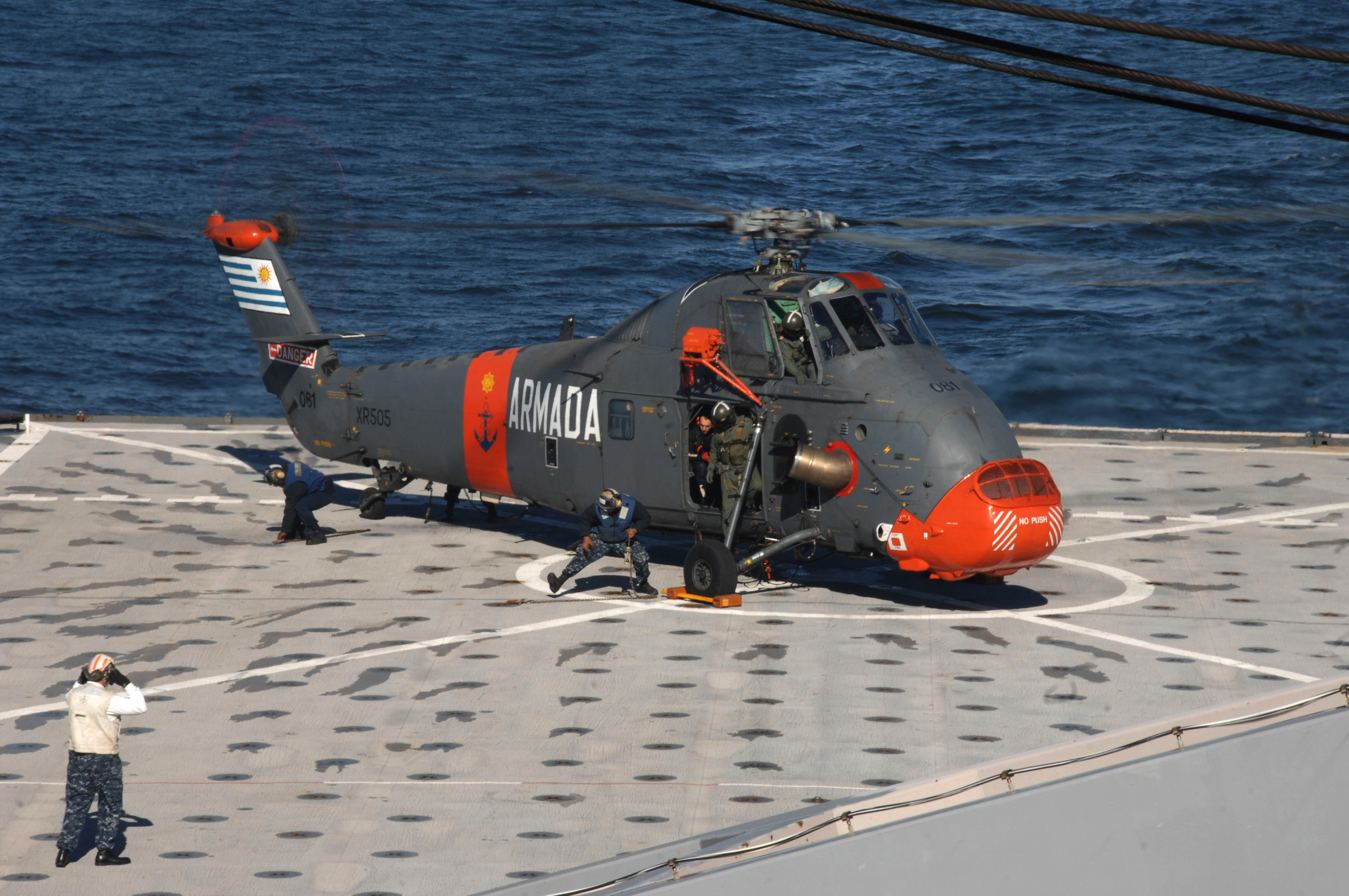
Westland Wessex refitted

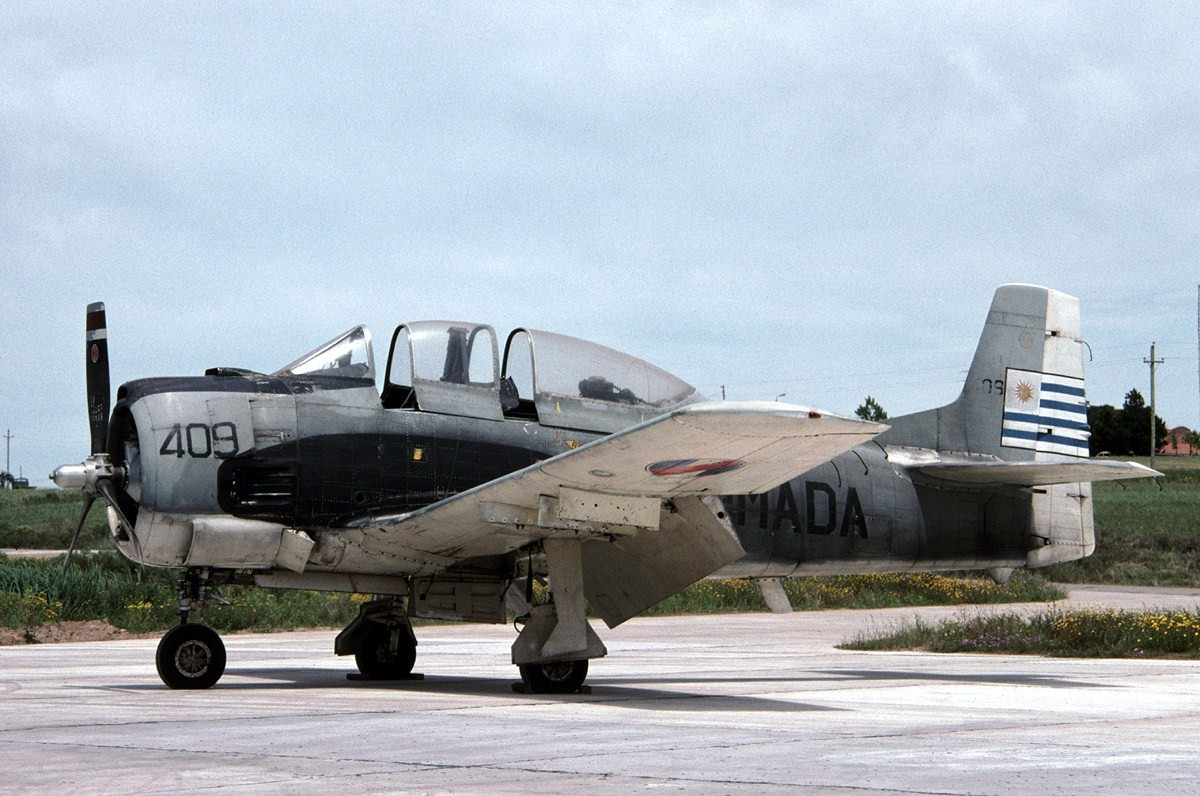
T-28S Fennec

== Future ==
The Uruguayan Navy plans to modernize its aging fleet through new ship acquisitions over the next decade. In 2021, Admiral Jorge Wilson, Commander of the Uruguayan Navy, signed a Letter of Acceptance which will allow the transfer of three Marine Protector-class patrol vessels from the United States Coast Guard. Each ship will include a rigid hull inflatable boat (RHIB) that can be launched from the stern of the larger vessel via an innovative launch and recovery system.

Uruguay has also commenced a tender process to purchase two Offshore Patrol Vessels for around $100 million. The current government will pay $50 million while the rest of the money will be paid in the next ten years, with the first vessel expected to be delivered by June 2024.

In June 2026, the Uruguayan government submitted a formal state-to-state offer of approximately €60 million to the United Kingdom to acquire three used River-class offshore patrol vessels (HMS Tyne, HMS Mersey, and HMS Severn) built between 2001 and 2003 for the Royal Navy. Announced by Deputy Secretary of the Presidency Jorge Díaz, the proposed acquisition under President Yamandú Orsi's government follows the termination of a previous shipbuilding contract with Spanish shipyard Cardama amid disputes regarding public funds.

== See also ==
- Artigas flag § Uruguayan Navy
