= USCGC Leopold =

Cancelled cutter of the US Coast Guard

Class overview
- Builders: United States Coast Guard Yard, Baltimore
- Operators: United States Coast Guard (proposed)
- Preceded by: Cape class; Point class
- Succeeded by: Marine Protector class; Island class
- Planned: 96
- On order: 1
- Canceled: 96
- Scrapped: 1

General characteristics
- Class & type: Heritage-class cutter
- Displacement: 157 long tons (160 t)
- Length: 118 feet (36 m)
- Beam: 23 feet (7.0 m)
- Draft: 9 feet (2.7 m)
- Speed: 30 knots (56 km/h; 35 mph)
- Range: 720 nautical miles (1,330 km; 830 mi) at 30 knots
- Complement: 17
- Armament: 1 × Mark 38 25 mm (0.98 in) gun; 2 × .50 in (1.3 cm) machine guns

USCGC Leopold (WPB-1400) was planned to be a prototype 120-foot (37 m) Heritage-class cutter of the United States Coast Guard. She was ordered in 1989 to replace older ships and was planned to be completed in 1993. However, changing geopolitics, an unplanned rise in cost, and criticism led them to cancel the class in 1991. The unfinished Leopold was abandoned.

== Design and development ==
By the late 1980s, the United States Coast Guard was making plans to replace the service's aging Cape and Point-class cutters. The resulting design, the Heritage class, was intended to replace both. The design featured an overall length of 118 feet (36 m), a beam of 23 feet (7.0 m), a draft of 9 feet (2.7 m), and a displacement of 157 long tons (160 t). Heritage class vessels were projected be powered by two diesel engines producing a top speed of 30 knots (56 km/h; 35 mph) and 6,000 shaft horsepower (4,500 kilowatts) through two propellers, with a projected maximum range of 720 nautical miles (1,330 km; 830 mi) at top speed. The ship's complement would have consisted of 15 enlisted sailors and two officers. The design proposed a Mark 38 25 mm (0.98 in) main gun and two .50 in (1.3 cm) machine guns. It also included a streamlined aluminum superstructure, a bridge with a 360° view, a tripod mast, towing equipment, and a large shield in front of the deckhouse. The steel hull had a raked bow, a "deep-V" shape, and reinforced plating intended to allow the ship to stay in service for three decades.

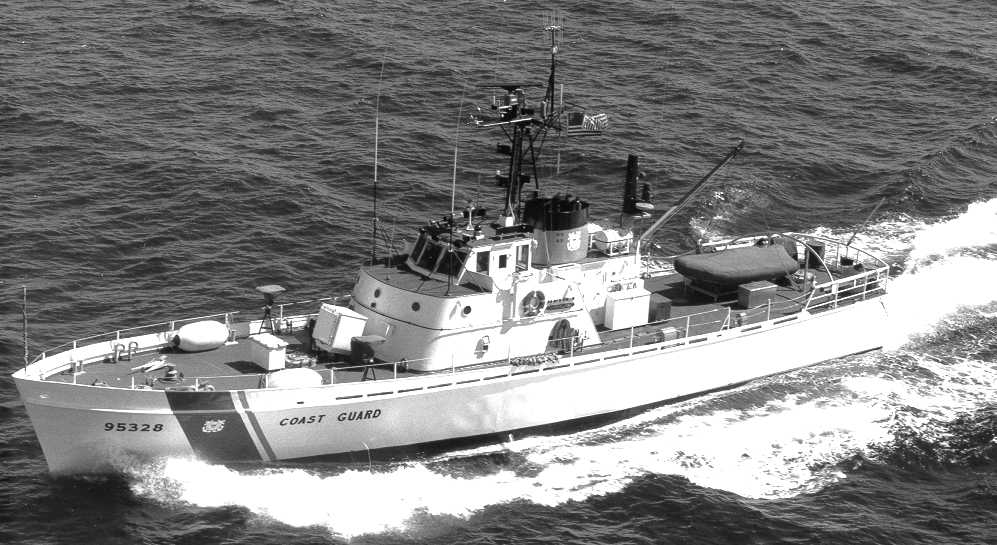
A Cape-class cutter which was planned to be replaced by Leopold and the Heritage class.

Leopold was intended to serve as a prototype for the class; if she proved successful, the Coast Guard planned on building 35 additional ships in the first batch, and an eventual total of 96 Heritage-class cutters. Leopold and the rest of the class were named after previous Coast Guard vessels that served during the Second World War. USS Leopold, while commissioned by the United States Navy, was manned and operated by the Coast Guard when she was torpedoed in 1944, which killed most of her crew. The new Leopold was ordered in March 1989 and was laid down on 27 August 1990 at the Coast Guard Yard in Curtis Bay, Maryland. She was projected to be complete in 1993, but a July 1991 report from the General Accounting Office criticized the program. They believed that the design would not adequately replace the ships that were then in service, and they did not believe 96 were needed. In addition, the cost to build Leopold had doubled from $7.7 million to $13 million. On 25 November 1991, the Coast Guard suspended work on Leopold and canceled the class, stating "times have changed". The program's cancelation strained the service, prominently in relation to the war on drugs and other anti-narcotics operations, as other vessels continued to be retired. However, planning continued on replacing the older cutters; the Point class was later replaced by the Marine Protector class, and the Cape class with the Island class.
