= USCGC Cape Fox =

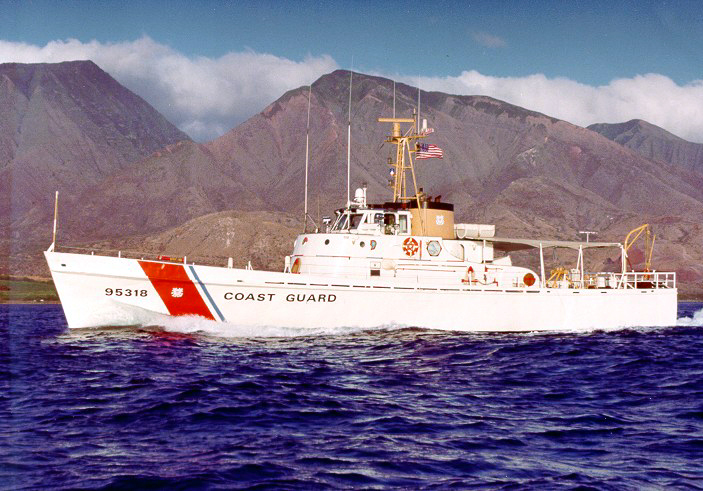
- Sister ship USCGC Cape Newagen

History

United States
- Name: USCGC Cape Fox
- Operator: United States Coast Guard
- Builder: Coast Guard Yard, Curtis Bay, Baltimore
- Commissioned: 22 August 1955
- Decommissioned: 30 June 1989
- Identification: WPB-95316
- Fate: Transferred to the Bahamas, 30 June 1989

Bahamas
- Name: HMBS San Salvador II
- Operator: Royal Bahamas Defence Force
- Acquired: 30 June 1989
- Stricken: 1999
- Identification: P10

General characteristics
- Class & type: Cape-class cutter
- Displacement: 105 long tons (107 t) full load
- Length: 95 ft (29 m) o/a; 90 ft (27 m) w/l
- Beam: 20 ft (6.1 m)
- Draft: 6 ft 5 in (1.96 m)
- Propulsion: As built: 4 × Cummins VT-600 diesel engines, 2,200 shp (1,641 kW); After refit: 2 × Detroit 16V149 diesels, 2,470 shp (1,842 kW)
- Speed: As built: 20 knots (37 km/h; 23 mph); After refit: 24 knots (44 km/h; 28 mph)
- Complement: 15
- Sensors & processing systems: SPS-64 navigation radar
- Armament: As built: 2 × Mousetrap ASW; 2 × Depth charge racks; 1 × 40 mm gun; 2 × .50 caliber machine guns; Added 1987: 2 × 12.7 mm machine guns; 2 × 40 mm Mk 64 grenade launchers

USCGC Cape Fox (WPB-95316) was a Type B Cape-class cutter of the United States Coast Guard. Built at the Coast Guard Yard in Curtis Bay, Baltimore the vessel was commissioned on 22 August 1955.

== Service history ==
The ship was stationed at New London, Connecticut, until transferred to Riviera Beach, Florida, in 1964. After a major refit in 1980–82, she replaced the Cape York in late 1981 after the Cuban Boatlift in Key West, Florida, apart from the period between December 1983 to February 1984, when she conducted surveillance operations from St. George's, Grenada. The principal duties of Cape Fox were search and rescue and law enforcement operations; she was credited with numerous seizures of shipments of illegal drugs.

The ship was decommissioned on 30 June 1989, and transferred to The Bahamas, where she served in the Royal Bahamas Defence Force under the name HMBS San Salvador II (P10) until 1999.
