= USCGC Cape Horn =

History

United States
- Name: USCGC Cape Horn
- Owner: U.S. Coast Guard
- Builder: United States Coast Guard Yard, Baltimore, Maryland, U.S.
- Commissioned: 3 September 1958–Spring 1982 (major overhaul)
- Recommissioned: 21 January 1983
- Decommissioned: January 1990
- Identification: MMSI number: 770576020 (as Rio Negro); Callsign: CWBJ (as Rio Negro)
- Fate: Transferred to Uruguay, January 1990

General characteristics
- Class & type: Type "C" Cape-class cutter
- Displacement: 98 tons
- Length: 95 ft (29 m)
- Beam: 20 ft (6.1 m)
- Draft: 6 ft 2 in (1.88 m)
- Propulsion: 4 × Cummins VT-600 diesel engines (1958–1982); 2 Detroit 16V149 diesel engines (1982–1989)
- Speed: 26 knots (48 km/h; 30 mph)
- Range: 3,560 nmi (6,590 km; 4,100 mi)
- Complement: 15 (1961)
- Sensors & processing systems: Radar: AN/SPS-64 (1987)
- Armament: 2 × M2 Browning machine guns (as completed); 2 × M60 machine guns; 2 × 40 mm Mk 64 grenade launchers (1987)

USCGC Cape Horn was a 95-foot (29 m) type "C" Cape-class cutter constructed at the Coast Guard Yard at Curtis Bay, Maryland, in 1958 for use as a law enforcement and search and rescue patrol boat.

== Design ==
The Cape-class cutter was designed originally for use as a shallow-draft anti-submarine warfare (ASW) craft and was needed because of the increased tension brought about by the Cold War. Cape Horn was a type "C" Cape-class cutter and was never fitted with ASW gear because the Coast Guard's mission emphasis had shifted away from ASW to search and rescue by the time she was built. The hull was constructed of steel and the superstructure was aluminum. She was powered originally by four Cummins VT-600 diesel engines; however during 1980–1982 she was refit with two 16V149 Detroit Diesel main engines.

== History ==
The Cape class was originally developed as an ASW boat and as a replacement for the aging, World War II vintage, wooden 83-foot (25 m) patrol boats that were used mostly for search and rescue duties. With the outbreak of the Korean War and the requirement tasked to the Coast Guard to secure and patrol port facilities in the United States under the Magnuson Act of 1950, the complete replacement of the 83-foot boat was deferred and the 95-foot boat was used for harbor patrols. The first 95-foot hulls were laid down at the Coast Guard Yard in 1952 and were officially described as "seagoing patrol cutters". Because Coast Guard policy did not provide for naming cutters under 100 feet (30 m) at the time of their construction they were referred to by their hull number only and gained the Cape-class names in 1964 when the service changed the naming criteria to 65 feet (20 m). The class was named for North American geographic capes.

The Cape class was replaced by the 110-foot (34 m) Island class beginning in the late 1980s and many of the decommissioned cutters were transferred to nations of the Caribbean and South America by the Coast Guard.

After commissioning in 1958, Cape Horn (then known only as WPB-95322) was assigned to a homeport at Provincetown, Massachusetts, and was used for law enforcement and search and rescue (SAR) in the Cape Cod area. In August 1962 she successfully saved the fishing vessel Norseman after fighting a fire. For that action she was awarded a Coast Guard Unit Commendation; a first for the Cape class. In addition, three of her crew were awarded individual commendations for their efforts in fighting the fire aboard the Norseman.

From April to July 1965 she was temporarily assigned to Miami, Florida, to assist with the Cuban exodus. on 1 September she escorted the Cuban motor vessel Bahia Santiago de Cuba from Cape Cod to international waters after the Cuban vessel tried unsuccessfully to enter U.S. waters. On 26 February 1966, Cape Horn escorted the fishing vessel Anita C. Rose from Nantucket Light to New Bedford, Massachusetts. She towed the disabled fishing vessel Blue Fin from 170 nmi (310 km) east of Cape Cod to Nantucket on 7 September 1968. On 28 January, she towed the disabled fishing vessel Silver Bay from 60 nmi (110 km) south of Nantucket to New Bedford. on 1 February, she escorted the distressed fishing vessel Leroy 83 nmi (154 km) south-southwest of Newport, Rhode Island, to that port. On 2 May she responded to a distress call with USCGC Cape Cross from the fishing vessel Stella Maris 110 nmi (200 km) east of Nantucket and both cutters escorted her to Newport.

On 19 October 1968, Cape Horn earned a second Unit Commendation Medal for rendering assistance the distressed fishing vessel Harry Glen which had broken down in a severe storm off Cape Cod. Cape Horn towed the stricken vessel to safety.

On 7 February 1980, Cape Horn rescued six crewmen from the Gloucester, Massachusetts based fishing vessel Hattie Rose which was taking on water in 25-foot seas and 45-knot winds 15 nmi (28 km) east of Provincetown. During the rescue, two of trawler crew fell overboard and two crewmen from Cape Horn jumped in the 35-degree water and attached a line to the crewmen and all four were pulled from the water. Cape Horn earned a Coast Guard Meritorious Unit Commendation for this rescue.

In 1982, Cape Horn underwent a major overhaul at the Coast Guard Yard, where her main drive engines were replaced and crew habitability was improved. She was recommissioned on 21 January 1983 and stationed at Fort Tilden, New York, where she was used for law enforcement and SAR missions. During the summer of 1986 she participated in the centennial celebration of the Statue of Liberty with increased patrol work to deal with the increase in boat traffic and she received a second Meritorious Commendation for that operation. In November 1986, she was temporarily assigned to drug interdiction patrols based out of Key West, Florida. On 28 July 1987, Cape Horn seized the pirate radio station Radio Newyork International aboard the vessel Sarah located off Jones Beach and arrested the crew. By 1988, her patrol area included the waters from Cape Cod to Toms River, New Jersey.

== Disposition ==
In January 1990, Cape Horn was transferred to the National Navy of Uruguay and re-commissioned as Rio Negro (ROU-11).
