= USCGC Cape Henlopen =

Type "C" Cape-class coast guard cutter

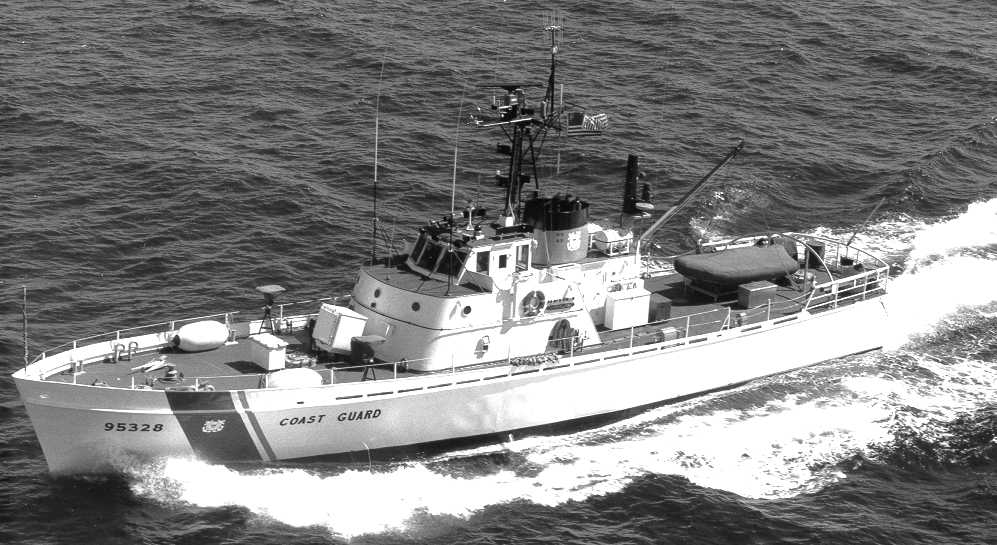
- USCGC Cape Henlopen (WPB-95328)

History

United States
- Name: Cape Henlopen
- Namesake: Cape Henlopen, Delaware
- Owner: U.S. Coast Guard
- Builder: United States Coast Guard Yard, Baltimore, Maryland
- Commissioned: 5 December 1958
- Decommissioned: 28 September 1989
- Fate: Transferred to Costa Rica, 28 September 1989

Costa Rica
- Name: Astronauta Franklin Chang Diaz
- Owner: Costa Rica Coast Guard
- Acquired: 28 September 1989
- Decommissioned: 2006
- Fate: Sunk as an artificial reef, 2006

General characteristics
- Class & type: Type "C" Cape-class cutter
- Displacement: 98 tons
- Length: 95 ft (29 m)
- Beam: 20 ft (6.1 m)
- Draft: 6 ft 2 in (1.88 m)
- Propulsion: 4 × Cummins VT-600 diesels (1958–1982); 2 Detroit 16V149 diesels (1982–1989)
- Speed: 26 kn (48 km/h)
- Range: 3,560 nmi (6,590 km)
- Complement: 15 (1961)
- Sensors & processing systems: Radar: AN/SPS-64 (1987)
- Armament: 1 × 20 mm gun; 2 × M1 rifles; 1 × M1911 pistol (1961); 2 × M2 Browning machine guns; 2 × 40 mm Mk 64 grenade launchers (1987)

USCGC Cape Henlopen was a 95-foot (29 m) type "C" Cape-class cutter constructed at the Coast Guard Yard at Curtis Bay, Maryland in 1958 for use as a law enforcement and search and rescue patrol boat.

== Design ==
The Cape-class cutter was designed originally for use as a shallow-draft anti-submarine warfare (ASW) craft and was needed because of the increased tension brought about by the Cold War. Cape Henlopen was a type "C" Cape-class cutter and was never fitted with ASW gear because the Coast Guard's mission emphasis had shifted away from ASW to search and rescue by the time she was built. The hull was constructed of steel and the superstructure was aluminum. She was powered originally by four Cummins VT-600 diesel engines; however during 1980–1982 she was refit with two 16V149 Detroit diesel main engines.

== History ==
The Cape class was originally developed as an ASW boat and as a replacement for the aging, World War II vintage, wooden 83-foot (25 m) patrol boats that were used mostly for search and rescue duties. With the outbreak of the Korean War and the requirement tasked to the Coast Guard to secure and patrol port facilities in the United States under the Magnuson Act of 1950, the complete replacement of the 83-foot boat was deferred and the 95-foot boat was used for harbor patrols. The first 95-foot hulls were laid down at the Coast Guard Yard in 1952 and were officially described as "seagoing patrol cutters". Because Coast Guard policy did not provide for naming cutters under 100 feet (30 m) at the time of their construction they were referred to by their hull number only and gained the Cape-class names in 1964 when the service changed the naming criteria to 65 feet (20 m). The class was named for North American geographic capes.

The Cape class was replaced by the 110-foot (34 m) Island class beginning in the late 1980s and many of the decommissioned cutters were transferred to nations of the Caribbean and South America by the Coast Guard.

Cape Henlopen was stationed at Coast Guard Air Station Port Angeles, Washington, from 1959 to December 1966. In August 1961, she assisted USCGC Minnetonka in fighting a fire aboard the fishing vessel Alaska Reefer in the Strait of Juan de Fuca. From December 1966 to 1968, she was stationed at Port Angeles, Washington. On 29 October 1967, she escorted the distressed Soviet motor vessel Altajaskie Gory while in U.S. waters off Washington. On 20 November 1967, she escorted the distressed Soviet fishing vessel Ogonj and other Soviet vessels while in U.S. seas off the coast of the State of Washington.

From 1969 to 1981, she was stationed at Petersburg, Alaska. On 3 February 1971, she rescued the five-person crew of the fishing vessel Decora after Decora struck Colorado Reef (56°38′20″N 132°56′10″W) in Wrangell Narrows in the Alexander Archipelago in Southeast Alaska and sank. On 4–5 October 1979, she assisted the fishing vessels and pleasure craft Black Bear, Diane, Heidi, and Will Do Too in Stephens Passage following a storm. On 1 May 1980, she repaired and refloated the motor vessel Biorkau. She underwent major renovation from 1980 to 1982. From 1983 to 1989, she was stationed at Woods Hole, Massachusetts. On 28 July 1985, she assisted in the rescue of 118 persons from the passenger vessel Pilgrim Bell off Cuttyhunk Island.

== Disposition ==
After decommissioning in 1989, Cape Henlopen was transferred to the Costa Rica Coast Guard and recommissioned as Astronauta Franklin Chang Diaz (SP 951). She was taken out of active service in 2006 and sunk in the Gulf of Nicoya as an artificial reef.
