= Capitán Miranda (schooner) =

Ship of the National Navy of Uruguay

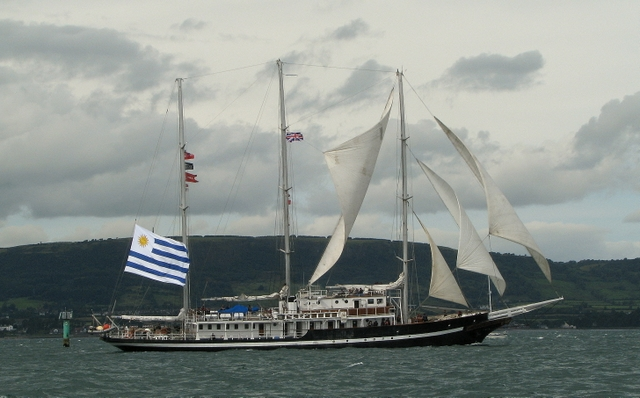
- Capitán Miranda at Tall Ships Belfast, 2009

History

Uruguay
- Name: Capitán Miranda
- Ordered: January 1930
- Builder: Sociedad Española de Construcción Naval, Cádiz
- Laid down: 3 March 1930
- Launched: 27 July 1930
- Commissioned: 1930
- Decommissioned: 1976
- Recommissioned: 1978
- Reclassified: As a training ship, 1978
- Home port: Montevideo
- Identification: MMSI number: 770576100; Call sign: CWBE
- Motto: Mare Magnum
- Status: in active service, as of 2026

General characteristics
- Type: Schooner
- Displacement: 839 long tons (852 t)
- Length: 64 m (210 ft 0 in) o/a
- Beam: 8 m (26 ft 3 in)
- Draught: 3.8 m (12 ft 6 in)
- Propulsion: 750 hp (559 kW) diesel engine, single 4-bladed screw
- Sail plan: Marconi rig, sail area 853.35 m^{2} (9,185.4 sq ft)
- Speed: 10 knots (19 km/h; 12 mph)
- Capacity: 8 passengers
- Complement: 67

Capitán Miranda (ROU 20) is a three-masted staysail schooner of the Uruguayan Navy. Originally acquired by the Uruguayan Navy as a survey ship in 1930, the ship remained in service until 1976 in this role. Destined for the shipbreakers, the vessel was repurposed as a training ship in 1978.

== Ship history ==
Capitán Miranda was ordered in January 1930 from the Spanish Sociedad Española de Construcción Naval shipyard at Cádiz. The vessel was laid down on 3 March and launched on 27 July 1930. As a hydrographic vessel she displaced 552 tons, with an overall length of 54.85 m (180.0 ft), and a beam of 8 m (26 ft). Capable of 12.5 knots (23.2 km/h; 14.4 mph), the ship was armed with a 37 mm cannon and a machine gun, and had a complement of 52. She was named after Captain Francisco Prudencio Miranda (1868–1925), Uruguayan naval officer and marine geographer.

Sea trials were completed on 19 November 1930, and on 21 November Capitán Miranda was delivered to the Uruguayan Navy. She served as a survey ship, charting the coasts and waters of Uruguay until 1976. She was then due to be scrapped, but instead was converted into a three-masted schooner. The conversion was completed by 20 October 1978, when she began in her new role as a training ship. Capitan Miranda has since participated in numerous international tall ship regattas.

== Gallery ==
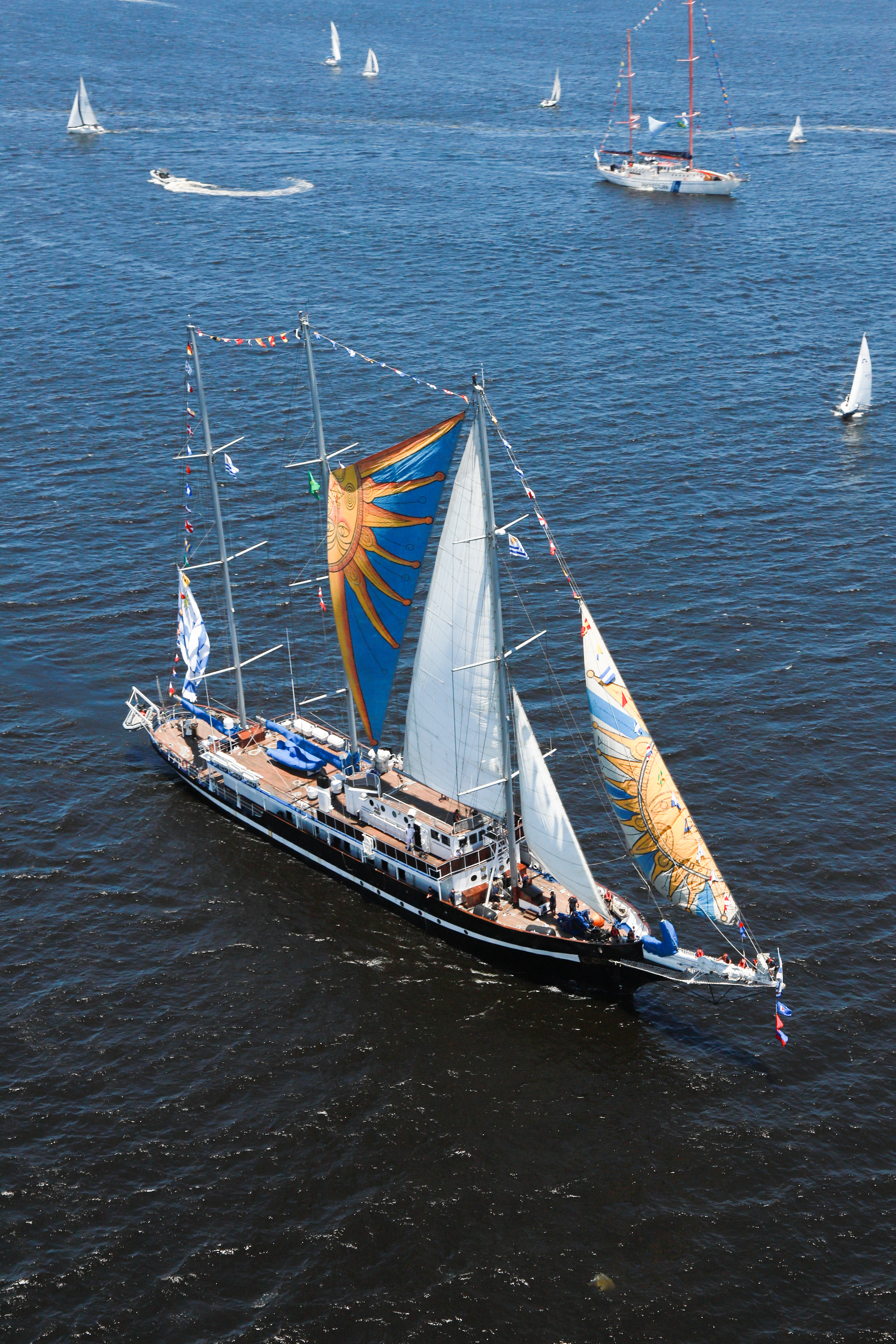
Aerean view ofCapitán Miranda

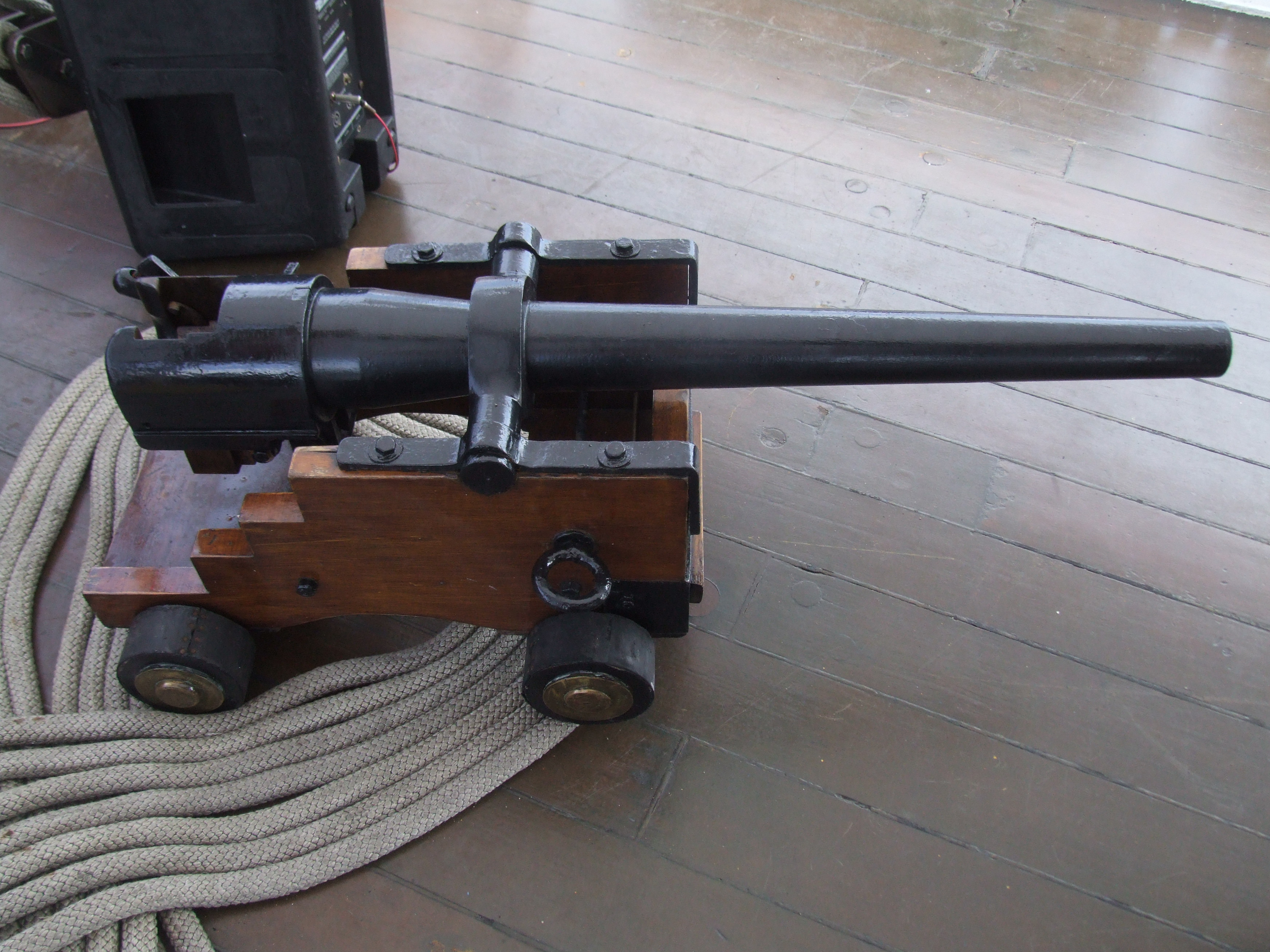
Gun on deck of Capitán Miranda

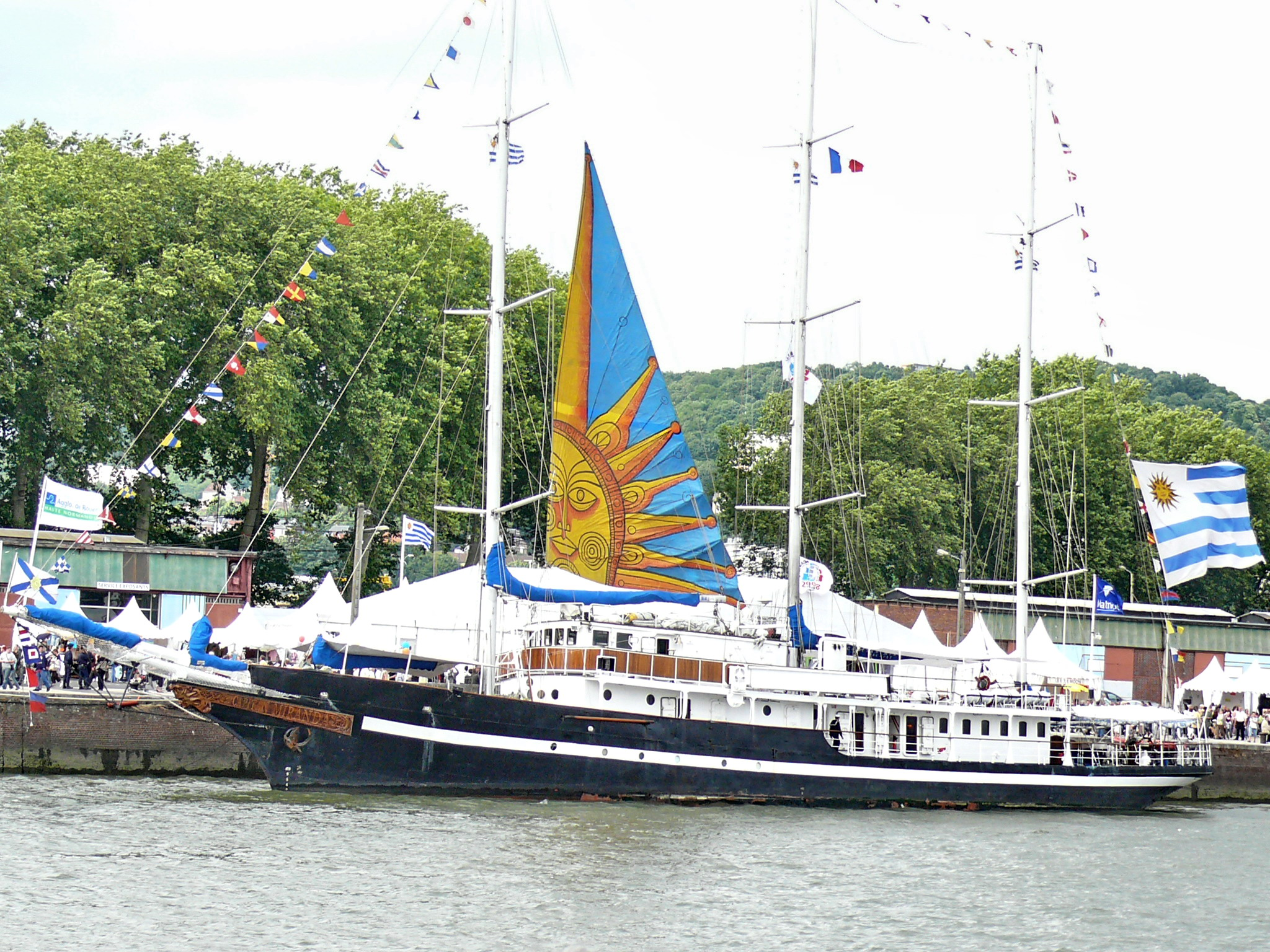
Capitán Miranda at Armada Rouen 2008

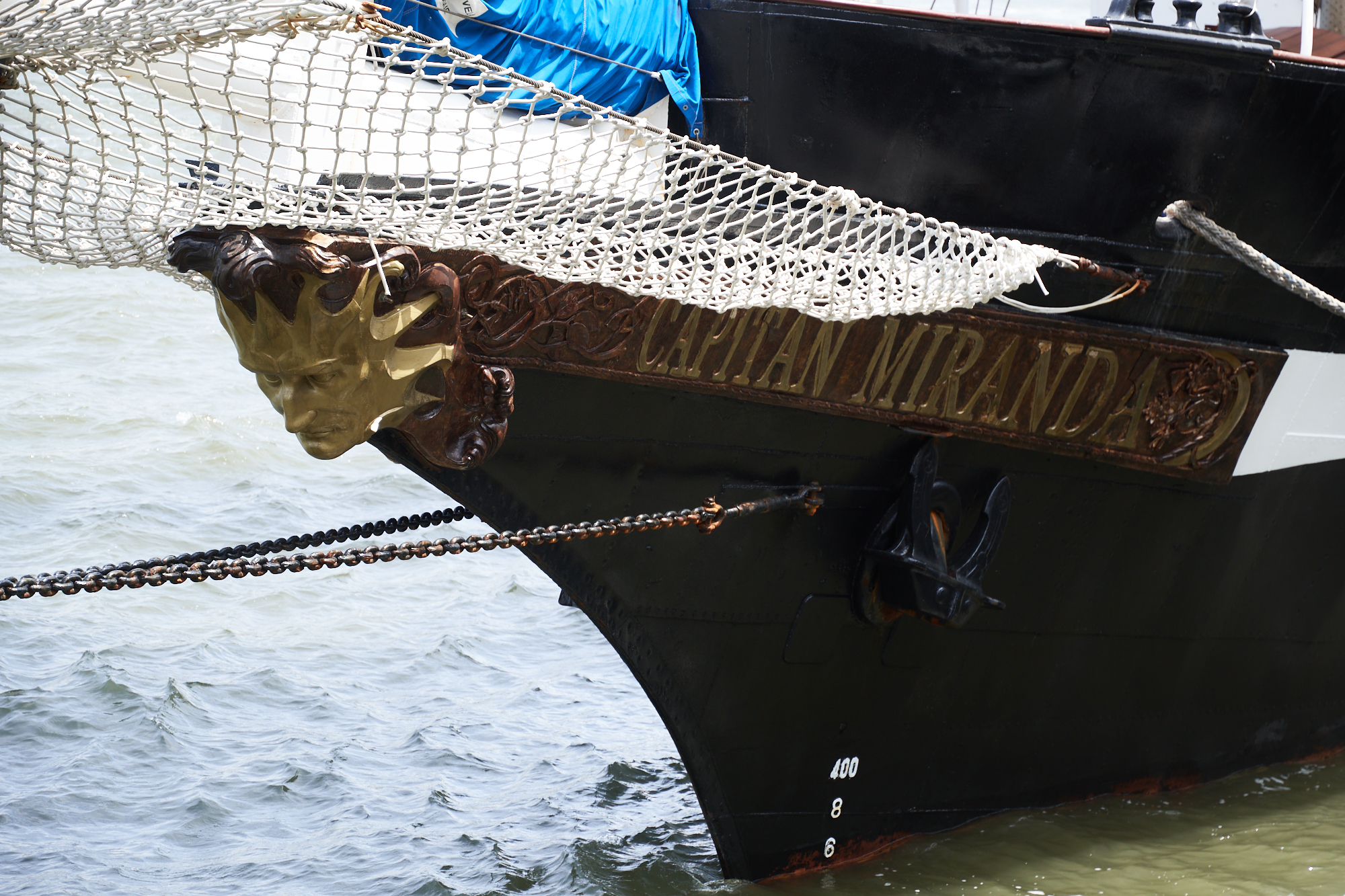
Bow and figurehead, Capitán Miranda, South Street Seaport, New York City May 2023

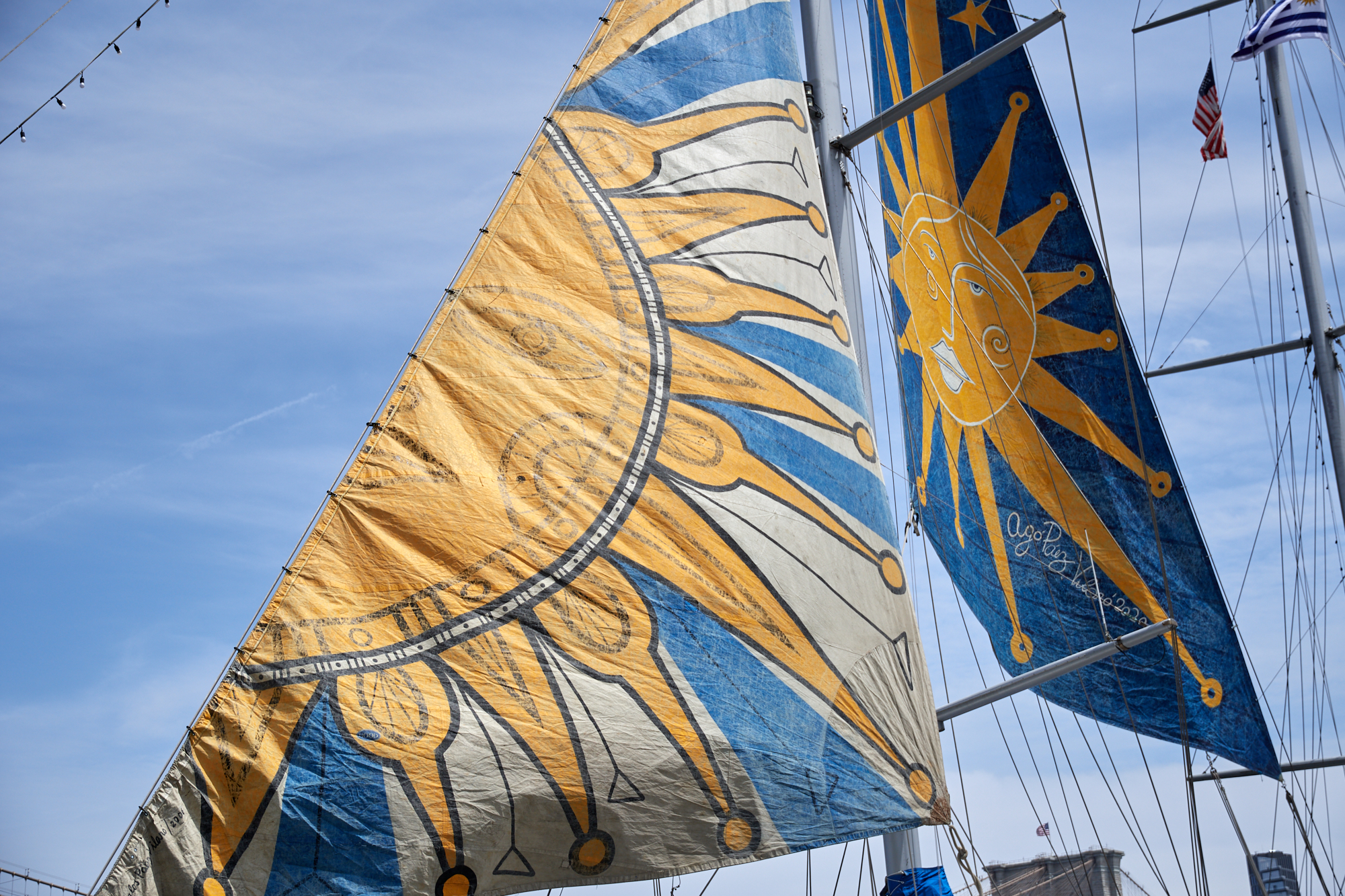
Accent jibs and stays, Capitán Miranda, South Street Seaport, New York City May 2023

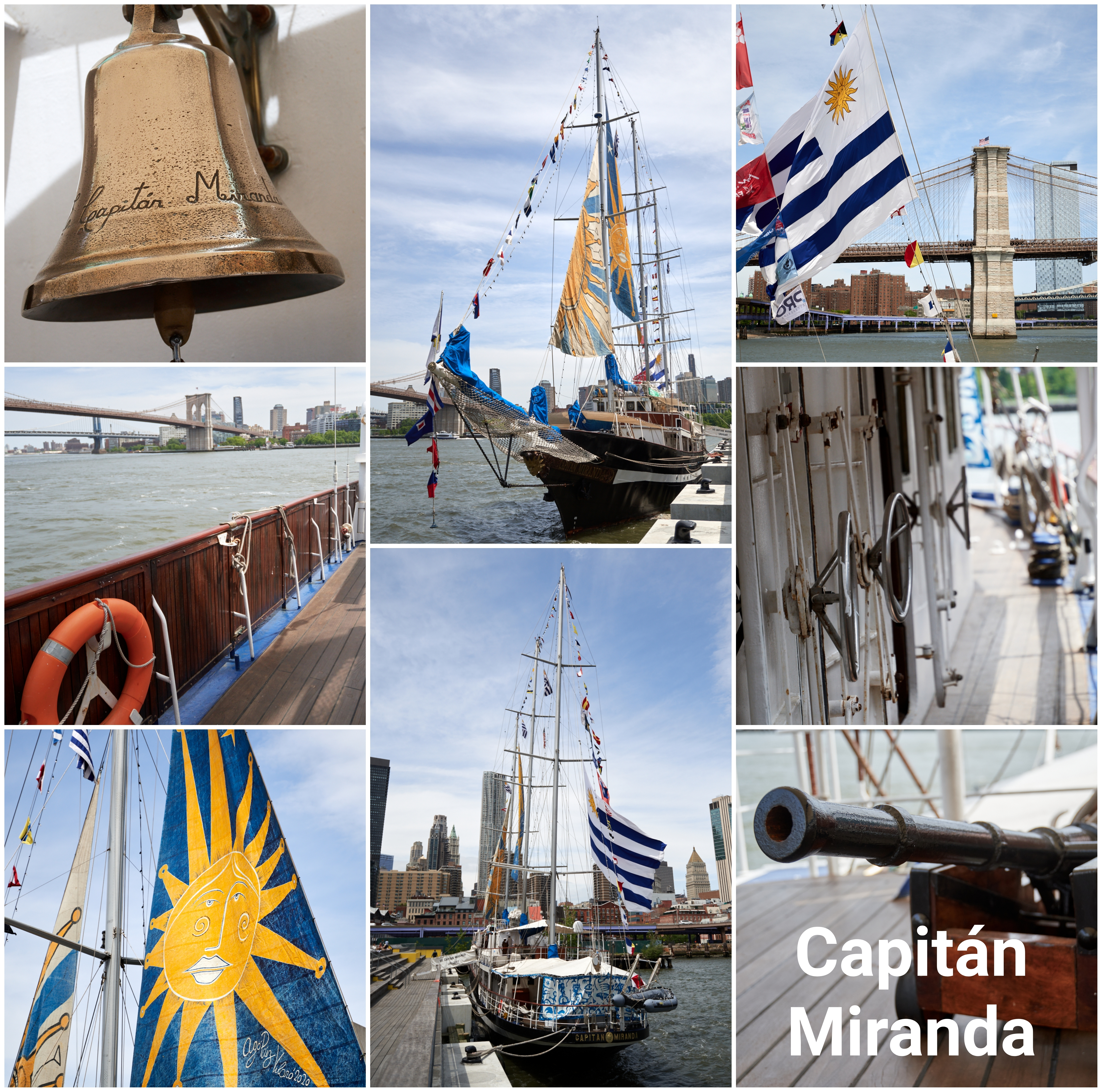
Capitán Miranda, South Street Seaport, New York City May 2023
