= ROU Vanguardia =

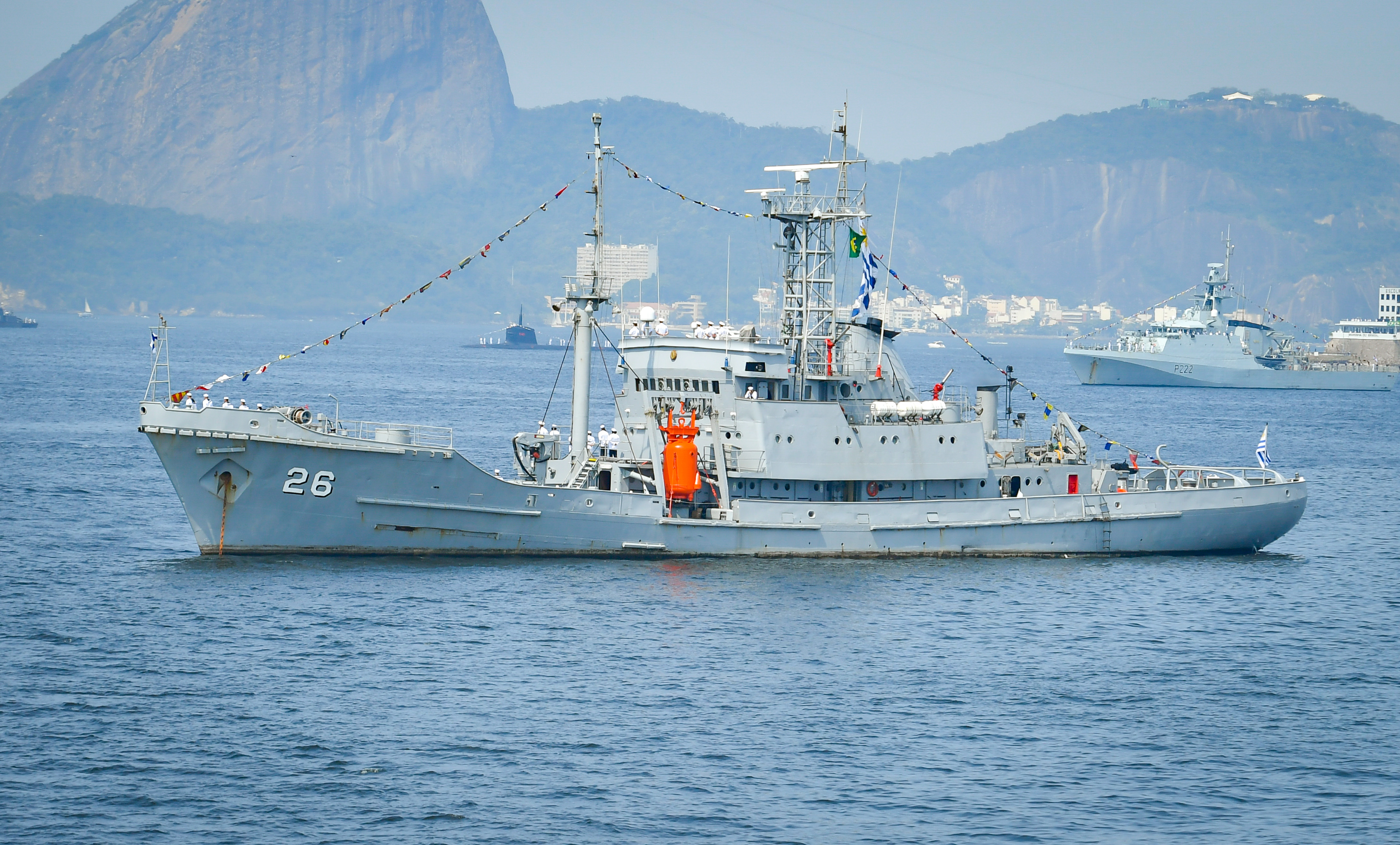
- Vanguardia in 2022

History

Uruguay
- Name: Vanguardia
- Builder: Gdansk Shipyards
- In service: 1976
- Out of service: 2026
- Refit: 1991
- Home port: Montevideo
- Identification: Pennant number: ROU 26
- Status: decommissioned

General characteristics
- Class & type: Piast-class salvage and research vessel
- Displacement: 1697 t
- Length: 238.25 ft (72.62 m)
- Propulsion: 2 Diesel Zgoda Sulzer 6TD48 engines, 3,600 shp (2.7 MW)
- Speed: 16.3 knots (30.2 km/h; 18.8 mph)

ROU Vanguardia (26) was a Piast-class salvage and marine research vessel in service with the Uruguayan Navy. The ship was laid down for the East German Navy in 1976, before being acquired by the German government after the Reunification of Germany. The ship was purchased by the Republic of Uruguay in 1991 and renamed Vanguardia. The ship was decommissioned on 2 September 2026.

== History ==
Vanguardia was laid down as a Piast-class salvage and rescue vessel (Bergungsschiff) for the Volksmarine on 28 December 1976. The ship was built at Gdańsk, Poland using designs provided by the Polish Navy. She was commissioned into the Volksmarine as the Otto von Guericke (570), named for 17th century Prussian scientist Otto von Guericke. Following the 1990 Reunification of German and the dissolution of the National People's Army, the ship was absorbed into the German fleet reserve. Otto von Guericke was acquired by the Uruguayan Navy in October 1991, refitted and renamed Vanguardia and given the pennant number 26. The ship entered Uruguayan service in 1992. Eventually the ship was decommissioned on 2 September 2026, following compromising structural fatigue and mechanical seizures that turned the ship into a severely unseaworthy vessel.

Vanguardia served as marine research and rescue vessel. Much of the vessel's role in the Uruguayan fleet revolves around the transport of supplies and passengers to Antarctica. The ship made an annual trips to King George Island to deliver supplies. In November 2017 Vanguardia was deployed as part of the rescue operations following the loss of the Argentine submarine in the South Atlantic.

The ship was celebrated for 26 years in Uruguayan service in December 2018. Despite being no longer in service, it remains the ship with the most Antarctic operations of the Uruguayan Navy, being one of the most important vessels that served said Navy since 1991.
