= USCGC Cape Upright =

Steel-hulled patrol boat of the 95-Foot or Cape class

History

United States
- Name: USCGC Cape Upright (WPB-95303)
- Owner: United States Coast Guard
- Operator: United States Coast Guard
- Builder: Coast Guard Yard
- Commissioned: 2 July 1953
- Decommissioned: 6 January 1989
- Home port: 1953 – 60: Norfolk, Virginia; 1961 – 69: Southport, North Carolina; 1970 – 73: Wrightsville Beach, North Carolina; 1976 – 77: Coast Guard Yard, Curtis Bay, Maryland; 1978 – 89: Savannah, Georgia
- Nickname(s): "Cape Up All Night"; "Cape Uptight"; "Cape Downright"
- Fate: Transferred to Bahamas, 10 June 1989

The Bahamas
- Name: HMBS David Tucker (P07)
- Owner: Royal Bahamas Defence Force
- Operator: Royal Bahamas Defence Force
- Acquired: 10 June 1989
- Decommissioned: 1996
- Fate: Sunk in 1997 as an artificial reef

General characteristics
- Class & type: Cape class
- Displacement: 102 long tons (104 t)
- Length: 90 ft (27 m) waterline; 95 ft (29 m) overall
- Beam: 20 ft (6.1 m) max
- Draft: 6 ft 4 in (1.93 m)
- Propulsion: 4 Cummins VT-600 diesels; 2 Detroit 16V149 diesels (renovated)
- Speed: 20 knots (37 km/h); 24 knots (44 km/h) (renovated)
- Range: 1,418 nautical miles (2,626 km; 1,632 mi)
- Complement: 15
- Armament: 2 mousetraps; 2 depth charge racks; 2 20 mm (twin); 2 .50-caliber machine guns; 2 12.7 mm machine guns; 2 40 mm Mk 64 grenade launchers

USCGC Cape Upright was United States Coast Guard steel-hulled patrol boat of the 95-Foot or Cape class.

== Service ==
- 1953: From here stationed at Norfolk, Virginia, to 1960 and was used for law enforcement (LE) and Search and Rescue (SAR) operations.
- 1961: From here to 1969, stationed at Southport, North Carolina where she was again used for LE and participated in many SAR operations. Cape Upright participated in the recovery of a U.S. Navy seaman's body whose helicopter crashed off Frying Pan Shoals Light Tower in January 1967. Three crew members were recovered alive and another went down with the helicopter
- 29 April 1969, medevaced a crewman from FV Thalia.
- 28 July 1969: towed the disabled schooner Chauve Souris 19 miles west of Frying Pan Light Tower to Southport, NC.
- 24 December 1969: towed the disabled FV Dream One 45 miles east of Wrightsville Beach, North Carolina.
- 1970: From here to 1973, was stationed at Wrightsville Beach, NC, being used again for LE and SAR operations.
- 31 July 1970, towed the disabled sailboat Pandora 35 miles southeast of Cape Fear to Wrightsville Beach.
- 1974: From here to 1976, was held for transfer to Lebanon under the Military Assistance Program.
- 1976-1977: underwent major renovation at the Coast Guard Yard, Curtis Bay, Maryland.
- 1978 to 1989: was stationed at Savannah, Georgia, and was used for LE and SAR operations.
- 10 September 1982: helped seize MV Mont Boron, which was suspected of drug smuggling off Florida.
- 28 November 1982: seized the Cayman Island vessel Largo Izabel carrying 30 tons of marijuana after stopping her with gunfire.
- 18 November 1986: seized a speedboat in the Straits of Florida with marijuana on board.
- 21 November 1986: seized MV Don Yeyo 120 miles east of Miami, Florida, carrying 12 tons of marijuana.

== Transfer ==
Cape Upright was transferred to The Bahamas 10 June 1989 and renamed David Tucker (P07).

== Decommissioning ==
David Tucker (P07) was decommissioned in 1996 and donated to be sunk as an artificial reef in 1997 as part of Nassau's artificial reef program. A popular dive spot; it is located along an area known as Clifton Wall.
