= USCGC Cape Cross =

Search and rescue patrol boat

History

United States
- Name: Cape Cross
- Namesake: Cape Cross, Hoonah–Angoon, Alaska
- Owner: U.S. Coast Guard
- Builder: United States Coast Guard Yard, Baltimore, Maryland
- Commissioned: 20 August 1958
- Decommissioned: 2 March 1990
- Fate: Transferred to Micronesia, 28 September 1989

Micronesia
- Name: Paluwlap
- Acquired: 28 September 1989
- Identification: FSM–03

General characteristics
- Class & type: Type "C" Cape-class cutter
- Displacement: 98 tons
- Length: 95 ft (29 m)
- Beam: 20 ft (6.1 m)
- Draft: 6 ft 2 in (1.88 m)
- Propulsion: 4 × Cummins VT-600 diesels (1958–1982); 2 Detroit 16V149 diesels (1982–1989)
- Speed: 26 kn (48 km/h)
- Range: 3,560 nmi (6,590 km)
- Complement: 15 (1961)
- Sensors & processing systems: Radar: AN/SPS-64 (1987)
- Armament: 2 × M2 Browning machine guns (as completed); 2 × M60 machine guns; 2 × 40mm Mk 64 grenade launchers (1987)

USCGC Cape Cross was a 95-foot (29 m) type "C" Cape-class cutter constructed at the Coast Guard Yard at Curtis Bay, Maryland in 1958 for use as a law enforcement and search and rescue patrol boat.

== Design ==
The Cape-class cutter was designed originally for use as a shallow-draft anti-submarine warfare (ASW) craft and was needed because of the increased tension brought about by the Cold War. Cape Cross was a type "C" Cape-class cutter and was never fitted with ASW gear because the Coast Guard's mission emphasis had shifted away from ASW to search and rescue by the time she was built. The hull was constructed of steel and the superstructure was aluminum. She was powered originally by four Cummins VT-600 diesel engines; however during 1980–1982 she was refit with two 16V149 Detroit Diesel main engines.

== History ==
The Cape class was originally developed as an ASW boat and as a replacement for the aging, World War II vintage, wooden 83-foot (25 m) patrol boats that were used mostly for search and rescue duties. With the outbreak of the Korean War and the requirement tasked to the Coast Guard to secure and patrol port facilities in the United States under the Magnuson Act of 1950, the complete replacement of the 83-foot boat was deferred and the 95-foot boat was used for harbor patrols. The first 95-foot hulls were laid down at the Coast Guard Yard in 1952 and were officially described as "seagoing patrol cutters". Because Coast Guard policy did not provide for naming cutters under 100 feet (30 m) at the time of their construction they were referred to by their hull number only and gained the Cape class names in 1964 when the service changed the naming criteria to 65 feet (20 m). The class was named for North American geographic capes.

The Cape class was replaced by the 110-foot (34 m) Island class beginning in the late 1980s and many of the decommissioned cutters were transferred to nations of the Caribbean and South America by the Coast Guard.

Cape Cross was homeported at New Castle, New Hampshire from 1959 to 1968 where she was used for law enforcement and search and rescue (SAR). In June 1965, she assisted in the unsuccessful search of a ditched U.S. Air Force C-121 aircraft east of Nantucket, Massachusetts. On 28 May 1967, she medevaced a crewman from the fishing vessel Phillip J. Two Polish motor vessels were escorted from U.S. waters on 11 June. On 26 September, she escorted a lost fishing vessel 45 nmi (83 km) east-southeast of Boston, Massachusetts back to Boston. On 2 May 1968, she responded to a distress call with USCGC Cape Horn from the fishing vessel Stella Maris 110 nmi (200 km) east of Nantucket and both cutters escorted her to Newport.

In 1969, her homeport was transferred to Gloucester, Massachusetts where she was used for law enforcement and SAR missions. On 10 January 1977, two crewmen from the fishing vessel Chester A. Poling off Cape Ann, Massachusetts.

In 1982, Cape Cross underwent a major renovation which included removing the four Cummins main drive engines and replacing them with two Detroit Diesel units. After this modification, she was stationed at Crescent City, California for law enforcement and SAR. After 15 April 1987, she was homeported at Hilo, Hawaii.

== Disposition ==
After decommissioning in 1990, Cape Cross was transferred to the Federated States of Micronesia and recommissioned as Paluwlap (FSM 03).
