= USCGC Cape Shoalwater =

History

United States
- Name: Cape Shoalwater
- Namesake: Cape Shoalwater, Washington
- Builder: United States Coast Guard Yard, Baltimore, Maryland
- Commissioned: 17 October 1958
- Decommissioned: 9 December 1988
- Fate: Transferred to Bahamas, 30 June 1989

General characteristics
- Class & type: Type "C" Cape-class cutter
- Displacement: 98 tons
- Length: 95 ft (29 m)
- Beam: 20 ft (6.1 m)
- Draft: 6 ft 2 in (1.88 m)
- Propulsion: 4 × Cummins VT-600 diesel engines
- Speed: 22 knots (41 km/h; 25 mph)
- Range: 3,560 nmi (6,590 km; 4,100 mi)
- Crew: 15 (1961)
- Electronic warfare & decoys: Radar: AN/SPS-64 (1987)
- Armament: 2 × M2 Brownings (as completed)

USCGC Cape Shoalwater was a 95-foot (29 m) type "C" Cape-class cutter constructed at the Coast Guard Yard at Curtis Bay, Maryland in 1958 for use as a law enforcement and search and rescue patrol boat.

== Design ==
The Cape class was designed originally for use as a shallow-draft anti-submarine warfare (ASW) craft and was needed because of the increased tension brought about by the Cold War. Cape Shoalwater was a type "C" Cape class and was never fitted with ASW gear because the Coast Guard's mission emphasis had shifted away from ASW to search and rescue by the time she was built. The hull was constructed of steel and the superstructure was aluminum. She was powered by four Cummins VT-600 diesel engines.

== History ==
The Cape class was originally developed as an ASW boat and as a replacement for the aging, World War II vintage, wooden 83-foot (25 m) patrol boats that were used mostly for search and rescue duties. With the outbreak of the Korean War and the requirement tasked to the Coast Guard to secure and patrol port facilities in the United States under the Magnuson Act of 1950, the complete replacement of the 83-foot boat was deferred and the 95-foot boat was used for harbor patrols. The first 95-foot hulls were laid down at the Coast Guard Yard in 1952 and were officially described as "seagoing patrol cutters". Because Coast Guard policy did not provide for naming cutters under 100 feet (30 m) at the time of their construction they were referred to by their hull number only and gained the Cape-class names in 1964 when the service changed the naming criteria to 65 feet (20 m). The class was named for North American geographic capes.

The Cape class was replaced by the 110-foot (34 m) Island class beginning in the late 1980s and many of the decommissioned cutters were transferred to nations of the Caribbean and South America by the Coast Guard.

After commissioning, Cape Shoalwater was assigned a homeport at Mayport, Florida where she was used for law enforcement and search and rescue (SAR) missions. She and her crew earned the Navy Expeditionary Medal for operations relating to the Cuban refugee exodus from 3 January 1961 until 23 October 1962.

In 1963, her homeport was moved to Fort Lauderdale, Florida. On 9 August 1965, she towed the Panamanian motor vessel Seven Seas from 32 nmi (59 km) from southeast of Sombrero Key following mutiny aboard the vessel in which three of the crew of Seven Seas had been murdered. The same month, she escorted a Cuban refugee boat from 12 nmi (22 km) southwest of Bimini to Port Everglades, Florida. In 1988, the cutter participated in the seizure of the yacht Monkey Business after marijuana was found on board.

== Notes ==
=== References used ===
- "Marijuana Is Found on Yacht Hart Once Used". The Philadelphia Inquirer. Philadelphia, Pennsylvania. 15 May 1988. Archived from the original on 8 December 2015.
- "Cape Shoalwater, 1958 (WPB-95323)". Cutters, Craft & U.S. Coast Guard Manned Army & Navy Vessels. U.S. Coast Guard Historian's Office.
- Colton, Tim. "U.S. Coast Guard Patrol Craft Built Since WWII (WPB, WPC, WSES)". Shipbuildinghistory.com. Shipbuilding History. Archived from the original on 4 March 2016.
- Green, D.L. (March–April 1962). "The 82-foot Class Patrol Boat". The Engineer's Digest (133). U.S. Coast Guard: 2–5.
- Johnson, Robert Irwin (1987). Guardians of the Sea, History of the United States Coast Guard, 1915 to the Present. Naval Institute Press, Annapolis. ISBN 978-0-87021-720-3.
- Scheina, Robert L. (1990). U.S. Coast Guard Cutters & Craft, 1946–1990. Naval Institute Press, Annapolis, Maryland. ISBN 978-0-87021-719-7.
