= Piratini-class patrol boat =

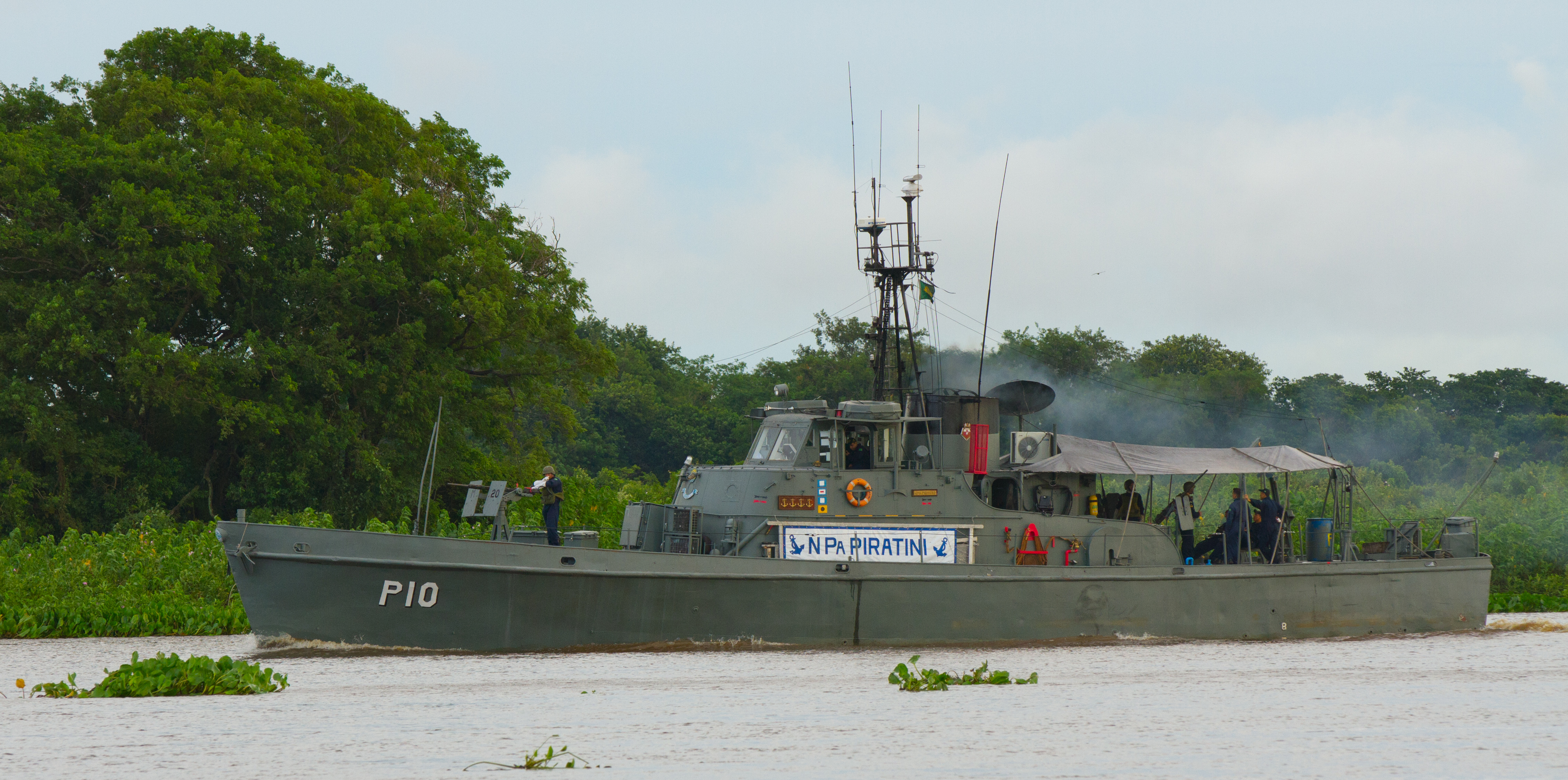
- Piratini underway in 2017

Class overview
- Name: Piratini class
- Operators: Brazilian Navy
- In commission: 1971–present
- Completed: 6
- Active: 5

General characteristics
- Type: Patrol vessel
- Displacement: 105 long tons (107 t) standard
- Length: 29.0 m (95 ft 2 in)
- Beam: 5.8 m (19 ft 0 in)
- Draught: 2.0 m (6 ft 7 in)
- Installed power: 4 × Cummins VT-12M diesel engines; 1,100 bhp (820 kW)
- Propulsion: 2 shafts
- Speed: 17 knots (31 km/h; 20 mph)
- Range: 1,700 nmi (3,148 km; 1,956 mi) at 12 knots (22 km/h; 14 mph)
- Complement: 15
- Armament: As delivered; 1 × .50 cal. machine gun; 1 × 81 mm mortar; Nowadays; 2 × .50 cal. machine gun; 1 × Oerlikon 20 mm

The Piratini-class are a series of patrol vessels that were built for the Brazilian Navy at the Rio de Janeiro Navy Arsenal. Based on the United States Coast Guard Cape-class cutter design, they were built between 1970 and 1971 as coastal patrol vessels. In 1993 they were moved from coastal patrol to riverine patrol.

== Description ==
Based on the United States Coast Guard Cape-class cutter design, the patrol vessels have a standard displacement of 105 long tons (107 t) and a full load displacement of 146 long tons (148 t) with a length between perpendiculars of 29.0 m (95 ft 2 in), a beam of 5.8 m (19 ft 0 in) and a 2.0 m (6 ft 7 in) draught. The ships are powered by four Cummins VT-12M diesel engines driving two shafts rated at 1,100 brake horsepower (820 kW). This gives the Piratini class a maximum speed of 17 knots (31 km/h; 20 mph) and a range of 1,700 nautical miles (3,148 km; 1,956 mi) at 12 knots (22 km/h; 14 mph).

The Piratini class was initially armed with a .50 calibre machine gun mount and an 81 mm (3.2 in) mortar mount. In 1988, the 81 mm mortar mount was removed. The main armament was later altered to two 12.7 mm (0.50 in) machine guns and one 20 mm (0.79 in) Oerlikon Mk 10 cannon. They were initially designed for coastal patrol. In 1993, the class was designated for riverine patrol.

In 2019, the Oerlikon Mk 10 cannons on the vessels Piratini, Pirajá, Penedo, and Poti were replaced with GAM-B01 cannons.

== Ships in class ==
Piratini-class patrol boats
Name	Hull #	Builder	Commissioned	Status	Fleet
Piratini	P 10	Arsenal de Marinha, Rio de Janeiro	30 November 1970	In service	Mato Grosso Flotilla
Piraja	P 11	Arsenal de Marinha, Rio de Janeiro	8 March 1971	In service	Mato Grosso Flotilla
Pampeiro	P 12	Arsenal de Marinha, Rio de Janeiro	16 June 1971	In service	Northern Naval Patrol Group
Parati	P 13	Arsenal de Marinha, Rio de Janeiro	29 July 1971	Decommissioned	Northern Naval Patrol Group
Penedo	P 14	Arsenal de Marinha, Rio de Janeiro	30 September 1971	In service	Mato Grosso Flotilla
Poti	P 15	Arsenal de Marinha, Rio de Janeiro	29 October 1971	In service	Mato Grosso Flotilla

== Service history ==
The class was constructed as part of the offshore agreement with the United States. All six vessels were completed in 1970–1971. In 2009, Piratini, Piraja, Penedo and Poti were based at Ladário Fluvial Base in Mato Grosso do Sul, the others, in Pará.
