= USCGC Cape Darby =

History

United States
- Name: Cape Darby
- Owner: U.S. Coast Guard
- Builder: United States Coast Guard Yard, Baltimore, Maryland
- Commissioned: 3 October 1958
- Decommissioned: 11 September 1968
- Fate: Transferred to South Korea, 24 March 1969

General characteristics
- Class & type: Type "C" Cape-class cutter
- Displacement: 98 tons
- Length: 95 ft (29 m)
- Beam: 20 ft (6.1 m)
- Draft: 6 ft 2 in (1.88 m)
- Propulsion: 4 x Cummins VT-600 diesels
- Speed: 26 kn (48 km/h)
- Range: 3,560 nmi (6,590 km)
- Complement: 15 (1961)
- Armament: 2 x M2 Browning machine guns (as completed)

USCGC Cape Darby was a 95-foot (29 m) type "C" Cape-class cutter constructed at the Coast Guard Yard at Curtis Bay, Maryland in 1958 for use as a law enforcement and search and rescue patrol boat.

== Design ==
The Cape-class cutter was designed originally for use as a shallow-draft anti-submarine warfare (ASW) craft and was needed because of the increased tension brought about by the Cold War. Cape Darby was a type "C" Cape-class cutter and was never fitted with ASW gear because the Coast Guard's mission emphasis had shifted away from ASW to search and rescue by the time she was built. The hull was constructed of steel and the superstructure was aluminum. She was powered by four Cummins VT-600 diesel engines.

== History ==
The Cape class was originally developed as an ASW boat and as a replacement for the aging, World War II vintage, wooden 83-foot (25 m) patrol boats that were used mostly for search and rescue duties. With the outbreak of the Korean War and the requirement tasked to the Coast Guard to secure and patrol port facilities in the United States under the Magnuson Act of 1950, the complete replacement of the 83-foot boat was deferred and the 95-foot boat was used for harbor patrols. The first 95-foot hulls were laid down at the Coast Guard Yard in 1952 and were officially described as "seagoing patrol cutters". Because Coast Guard policy did not provide for naming cutters under 100 feet (30 m) at the time of their construction they were referred to by their hull number only and gained the Cape-class names in 1964 when the service changed the naming criteria to 65 feet (20 m). The class was named for North American geographic capes.

The Cape class was replaced by the 110-foot (34 m) Island class beginning in the late 1980s and many of the decommissioned cutters were transferred to nations of the Caribbean and South America by the Coast Guard.

Cape Darby was assigned a homeport at Key West, Florida where she was used for law enforcement and search and rescue (SAR) missions. She travelled from the Coast Guard Yard in Maryland to Key West in the fall of 1958 under the command of CO Parker D Morris, USCGA '56. On 22 August 1965, she towed the disabled fishing vessel Miss Queenie 230 nmi (430 km) west of Key West to that port. In mid-September she towed and took aboard 50 Cuban refugees from two boats and took them to Dry Tortugas, Florida. On 27 January 1966, she escorted a boat carrying four Cuban refugees to Key West. On 5 January 1967 Cape Darby towed a disabled small craft carrying four Cubans to Key West. On 13 August she escorted the motor vessel Gran Lempira which had rescued 29 Cuban refugees to Key West. In late August 1967, she picked up six Cuban refugees from a raft 60 nmi (110 km) south of Key West. On 23 October she took aboard four Cuban refugees from the fishing vessel Stella Mystery. On 28 May 1968, she rescued nine Cubans from a raft 80 nmi (150 km) southeast of Key West.

Cape Darby and her crew earned the Navy Expeditionary Medal for operations relating to the Cuban refugee exodus from 3 January 1961 until 23 October 1962.

== Disposition ==
Cape Darby was decommissioned on 24 March 1969 and transferred to South Korea as PB 11. PB 11 was decommissioned by South Korea in 1984.
