= USCGC Cape Small =

History

United States
- Name: USCGC Cape Small (WPB-95300)
- Owner: United States Coast Guard
- Operator: United States Coast Guard
- Builder: Coast Guard Yard
- Commissioned: 17 July 1953
- Decommissioned: 13 April 1987
- Home port: Hilo, Hawaii (1953-1987)
- Fate: Transferred to Marshall Islands, 10 December 1987

Marshall Islands
- Acquired: 10 December 1987
- Status: Unknown

General characteristics
- Class & type: Cape class
- Displacement: 102 long tons (114 short tons)
- Length: 90 ft (27 m) waterline; 95 ft (29 m) overall
- Beam: 20 ft (6.1 m) max
- Draft: 6 ft 4 in (1.93 m)
- Propulsion: 4 Cummins VT-600 diesels; 2 Detroit 16V149 diesels (renovated)
- Speed: 20 knots (37 km/h); 24 knots (44 km/h) (renovated)
- Range: 1,418 nautical miles (2,626 km; 1,632 mi)
- Complement: 15
- Armament: 2 mousetraps; 2 depth charge racks; 2 20 mm Oerlikon (twin); 2 .50-caliber machine guns; 2 12.7mm machine guns; 2 40mm Mk 64 grenade launchers

USCGC Cape Small was United States Coast Guard steel-hulled patrol boat of the 95-Foot or Cape class. She was stationed in Hilo, Hawaii from 1953 to 1987 where she assisted in law enforcement as well as search and rescue operations. In December 1968, she assisted with the search and eventually rescued the pilot of a Piper Cherokee that ditched in the ocean 9 miles (14 km) north of Hawaii's big island.
