= Cape-class cutter =

Type of U.S. Coast Guard cutter

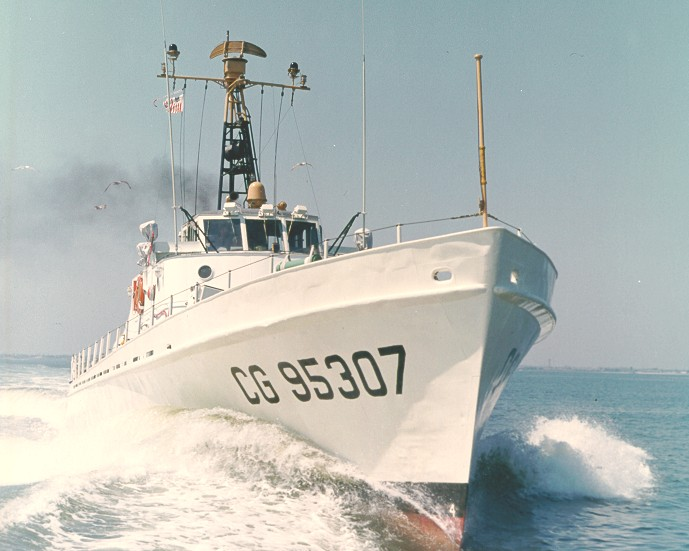
- Cape Current (WPB-95307), a Type A Cape-class patrol boat, in 1963.

Class overview
- Name: Cape class (after 1964)
- Builders: United States Coast Guard Yard in Curtis Bay, Baltimore
- Operators: United States Coast Guard
- Preceded by: 83-foot patrol boat
- Succeeded by: Island class cutter
- Completed: 36

General characteristics
- Class & type: Patrol boat
- Displacement: Type A, 102 tons fully loaded; Type B, 105 tons fully loaded; Type C, 98 tons fully loaded
- Length: 95 ft (29 m)
- Beam: 20 ft (6.1 m) max
- Draft: Type A, 6 ft 4 in (1.93 m); Type B, 6 ft 5 in (1.96 m); Type C, as completed
- Installed power: 4 Cummins VT-600 diesels (Types A, B, and C), 2200 hp; after renovation, 2 Detroit 16V149 diesels, 2470 hp
- Propulsion: twin propellers
- Speed: Types A & B, 20 knots max, Type C, 22 knots max, renovated, 24 knots
- Range: Cruising at 12 knots; Type A,1,418 mi (2,282 km); Type B, 1,700 mi (2,700 km); Type C,1,780 mi (2,860 km)
- Complement: 15 (1961)
- Sensors & processing systems: SPS-64 radar (1987)
- Electronic warfare & decoys: retractable type sonar (Types A & B only)
- Armament: Type A; 2 mousetrap depth charge racks, 2 20mm twin Oerlikon cannons, 2 .50 cal machine guns; Type B; 2 mousetrap depth charge racks, 1 40mm cannon, 2 .50 cal machine guns; Type C; 2 .50 cal machine guns, 2 40mm Mk 19 grenade launchers (1987)

The Cape-class patrol boats were 95-foot (29 m) steel hull patrol boats with aluminum superstructures of the United States Coast Guard. They were unnamed until 1964, when they acquired names of U.S. capes of land. Originally designed for anti-submarine warfare (ASW), all 36 boats in this class were built at the United States Coast Guard Yard in Curtis Bay, Maryland.

== History ==
The Cape class was originally developed as an ASW boat and as a replacement for the aging, World War II vintage, wooden 83-foot patrol boats (83 feet (25 m) in length) that were used mostly for search and rescue duties. With the outbreak of the Korean War and the requirement tasked to the Coast Guard to secure and patrol port facilities in the United States under the Magnuson Act of 1950, the complete replacement of the 83-foot boat was deferred and the 95-foot boat was used for harbor patrols. The first 95-foot hulls were laid down at the Coast Guard Yard in 1952 and were officially described as "seagoing patrol cutters". Because Coast Guard policy did not provide for naming cutters under 100 feet (30 m) at the time of their construction they were referred to by their hull number only and gained the Cape-class names in 1964 when the service changed the naming criteria to 65 feet (20 m). The class was named for North American geographic capes.

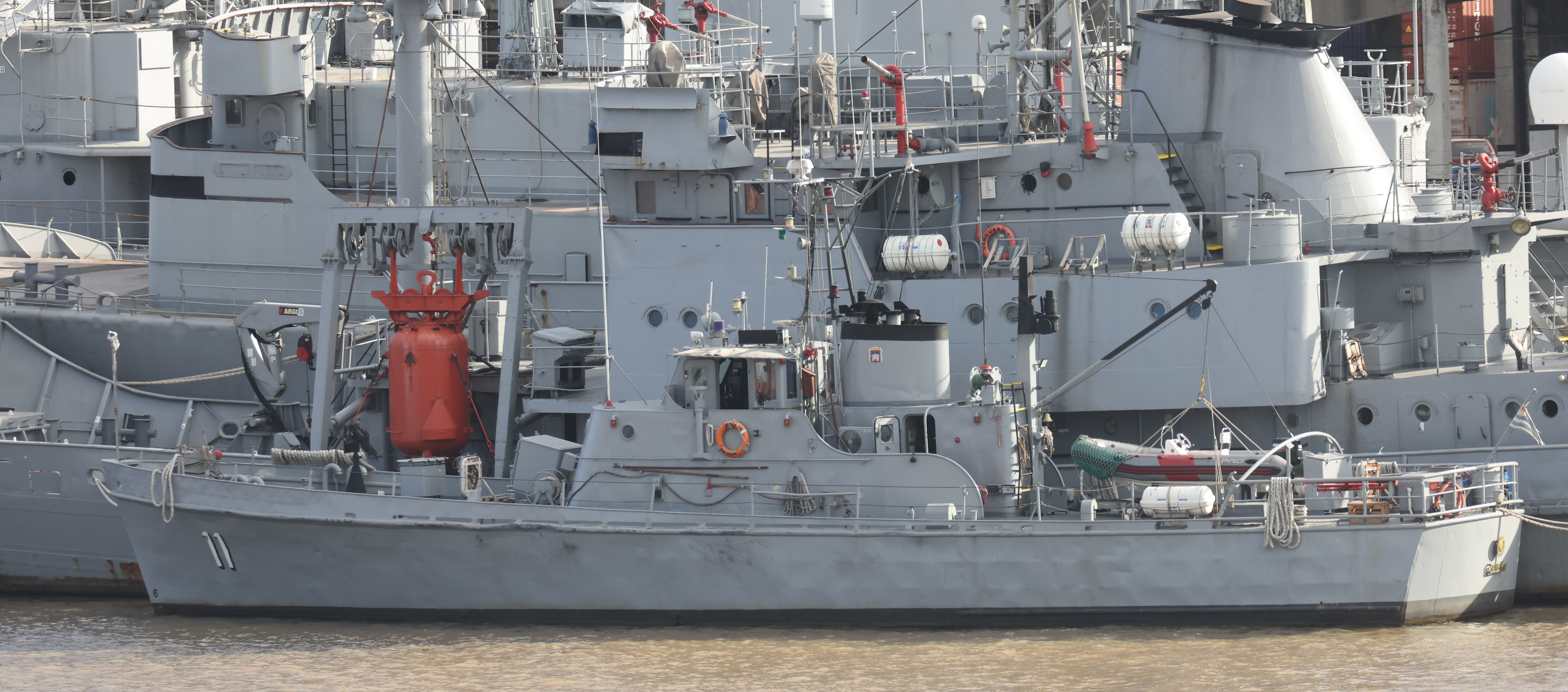
ROU Rio Negro, ex-USCGC Cape Horn, moored at Montevideo in 2024

The Cape class was replaced by the 110-foot (34 m) Island class beginning in the late 1980s and many of the decommissioned cutters were transferred to nations of the Caribbean and South America by the Coast Guard.

== Design ==
There were three sub-classes or types that evolved as missions for the boat changed. The Type A was outfitted primarily for ASW. The Type B was fitted more for search and rescue (SAR) with the addition of scramble nets, a towing bitt, and a large searchlight. The Type C vessels were constructed with a deck house aft of the bridge. Sixteen boats were overhauled as part of a renovation program began in the mid-late 1970s.

== Units ==
Number	Type	Name	Delivery	Disposition
95300	A	Cape Small	17 July 1953	To Marshall Islands 1987 as Ionmeto 2; sold 1992
95301	A	Cape Coral	21 September 1953	Decommissioned 1987; disposition unknown
95302	A	Cape Higgon	14 October 1953	To Uruguay 5 January 1990 as Colonia; decommissioned in 2022
95303	A	Cape Upright	2 July 1953	To Bahamas 10 June 1989 as David Tucker (Hull Number P07); Decommissioned in 1996 and donated and sunk as an artificial reef in 1997 as part of Nassau's artificial reef program. A popular dive spot; it is located along an area known as Clifton Wall
95304	A	Cape Gull	8 June 1953	Sold at auction to Fort Lauderdale businessman Dale Scutti who renamed her Robert Edmister in memory of a deceased friend; She was scuttled 11 December 1989 by five eight-pound dynamite charges administered by the Broward Sheriff's Office Bomb & Arson Unit. She now forms a part of the Broward County Artificial Reef Program.
95305	A	Cape Hatteras	28 July 1953	To Mexico 1991 as Cabo Catoche; active
95306	A	Cape George	10 August 1953	To Palau 10 June 1990
95307	A	Cape Current	24 August 1953	To Bahamas 30 June 1989 as Austin Smith
95308	A	Cape Strait	10 September 1953	Sunk 9 September 1993 as an artificial reef off Cape May, New Jersey
95309	A	Cape Carter	7 December 1953	To Mexico 2 March 1990 as Cabo Corrientes; active
95310	A	Cape Wash	15 December 1953	To U.S. Navy, 1987 as Olympic Venture, PTB-951, retired c.2010; transferred to Sea Scout ship Intrepid in 2012; transferred to Sea Scout Ship Terrapin in 2022; Renamed Terrapin in 2025.
95311	A	Cape Hedge	21 December 1953	To Mexico 27 April 1990 as Cabo Corzo; active
95312	B	Cape Knox	13 June 1955	Decommissioned 1989; sold to Sea Shepherd Conservation Society in 1991 as Sirenian. Renamed Yoshka in 2006. Currently working for the Galapagos National Park.
95313	B	Cape Morgan	5 July 1955	To Bahamas 20 October 1989 as Fort Fincastle; struck 1999
95314	B	Cape Fairweather	18 July 1955	Decommissioned 1985; disposition unknown
95315	B	La Crete a Pierrot	1 August 1955	To Haiti 1956; disposition unknown
95316	B	Cape Fox	22 August 1955	To Bahamas 30 June 1989 as San Salvador II; struck 1999
95317	B	Cape Jellison	7 September 1955	transferred to U.S. Navy; transferred to Boys and Girls Club of South San Francisco in 1993 and Sea Scouts as the Cape Hurricane SSS 906. Transferred to Sea Scouts as ship 145 SSS Challenger . Transferred to Sea Scout Ship Terrapin in 2022. Transferred to Scouting America Greater Yosemite Council in 2024. Currently docked at the Port of Stockton.
95318	B	Cape Newagen	26 September 1955	To Mexico 1982; reportedly transferred to U.S. Naval Air Station, Point Mugu, California
95319	B	Cape Romain	11 October 1955	transferred to U.S. Navy 11 August 1989; transferred to Sea Scouts as ship 51 SSS Intrepid in 1993. Scrapped at Lind Marine in Mare Island, Vallejo, California in 2022.
95320	B	Cape Starr	15 August 1956	Decommissioned 1987, active (pilot launch Toucan ) at Punta Arenas (Strait of Magellan); Chile; acquired by Transbordadora Austral Broom S.A. in 1995, Rebuild 2010.
95321	C	Cape Cross	20 August 1958	To Micronesia 30 March 1990 as Paluwlap (FSM 03); active
95322	C	Cape Horn	3 September 1958	To Uruguay January 1990 as Rio Negro; active
95323	C	Cape Darby	3 October 1958	To South Korea 24 March 1969 as PB 11; struck 1984
95324	C	Cape Shoalwater	9 December 1958	To Bahamas 30 June 1989 as Fenrick Stirrup, struck
95325	C	Cape Florida	28 October 1958	To South Korea 13 November 1968 as PB 7; struck 1971
95326	C	Cape Corwin	14 November 1958	To Micronesia 30 September 1990 as Constitution (FSM 04); active
95327	C	Cape Porpoise	21 November 1958	To South Korea 13 November 1968 as PB 8; struck 1984
95328	C	Cape Henlopen	5 December 1958	To Costa Rica 28 September 1989 as Astronauta Franklin Chang (SP 951); decommissioned 2006; sunk as an artificial reef the same year
95329	C	Cape Kiwanda	28 April 1959	To South Korea 24 March 1969 as PB 12; struck 1984
95330	C	Cape Falcon	12 May 1959	To South Korea 13 November 1968 as PB 9; struck 1984
95331	C	Cape Trinity	26 May 1959	To South Korea 24 September 1968 as PB 10; struck 1984
95332	C	Cape York	9 June 1959	To Bahamas 30 June 1989 as Edward Williams; struck ????; sunk as artificial reef Bahamas
95333	C	Cape Rosier	23 June 1959	To South Korea 24 September 1968 as PB 3; struck 1984
95334	C	Cape Sable	7 July 1959	To South Korea 24 September 1968 as PB 5; struck 1984
95335	C	Cape Providence	21 July 1959	To South Korea 24 September 1968 as PB 6; struck 1984

== See also ==
- List of United States Coast Guard cutters
- Piratini-class patrol boat, based directly on the Cape-class

== References cited ==
- Coast Guard Historian's official website. "Cape-Class 95-foot WPBs". U.S. Coast Guard Historian's Office.
- Green, LT D.L. (March–April 1962). "The 82-foot Class Patrol Boat". The Engineer's Digest. 133: 2–5. U.S. Coast Guard Historian's Office.
- Johnson, Robert Irwin (1987). Guardians of the Sea, History of the United States Coast Guard, 1915 to the Present. Naval Institute Press, Annapolis. ISBN 978-0-87021-720-3.
- Scheina, Robert L. (1990). U.S. Coast Guard Cutters & Craft, 1946-1990. Naval Institute Press, Annapolis. ISBN 978-0-87021-719-7.
