= Island-class patrol boat squadron =

Military history

The United States Coast Guard established Patrol Boat Squadrons to manage the 110-foot long Island-class patrol boats. Squadron ONE (renamed FOUR) was established in Miami Beach, Florida, and Squadron TWO was established in Roosevelt Roads, Puerto Rico. Their message traffic plain language addresses were COGARD PATBOATRON ONE and TWO, respectively. Created during the end of the Cold War, they were expeditionary squadrons modeled after the successful Coast Guard Squadron One employed during the Vietnam War. They provided a modernized template for the creation of Patrol Forces Southwest Asia (PATFORSWA) and Patrol Forces Mediterranean (PATFORMED) during Operation Iraqi Freedom.

== Cutters assigned ==
=== CG Patrol Boat Squadron Four (One) cutters ===
- USCGC FARALLON (WPB 1301)
- USCGC MANITOU (WPB 1302)
- USCGC MATAGORDA (WPB 1303)
- USCGC MAUI (WPB 1304)
- USCGC BARANOF (WPB 1318)
- USCGC CHANDELEUR (WPB 1319)

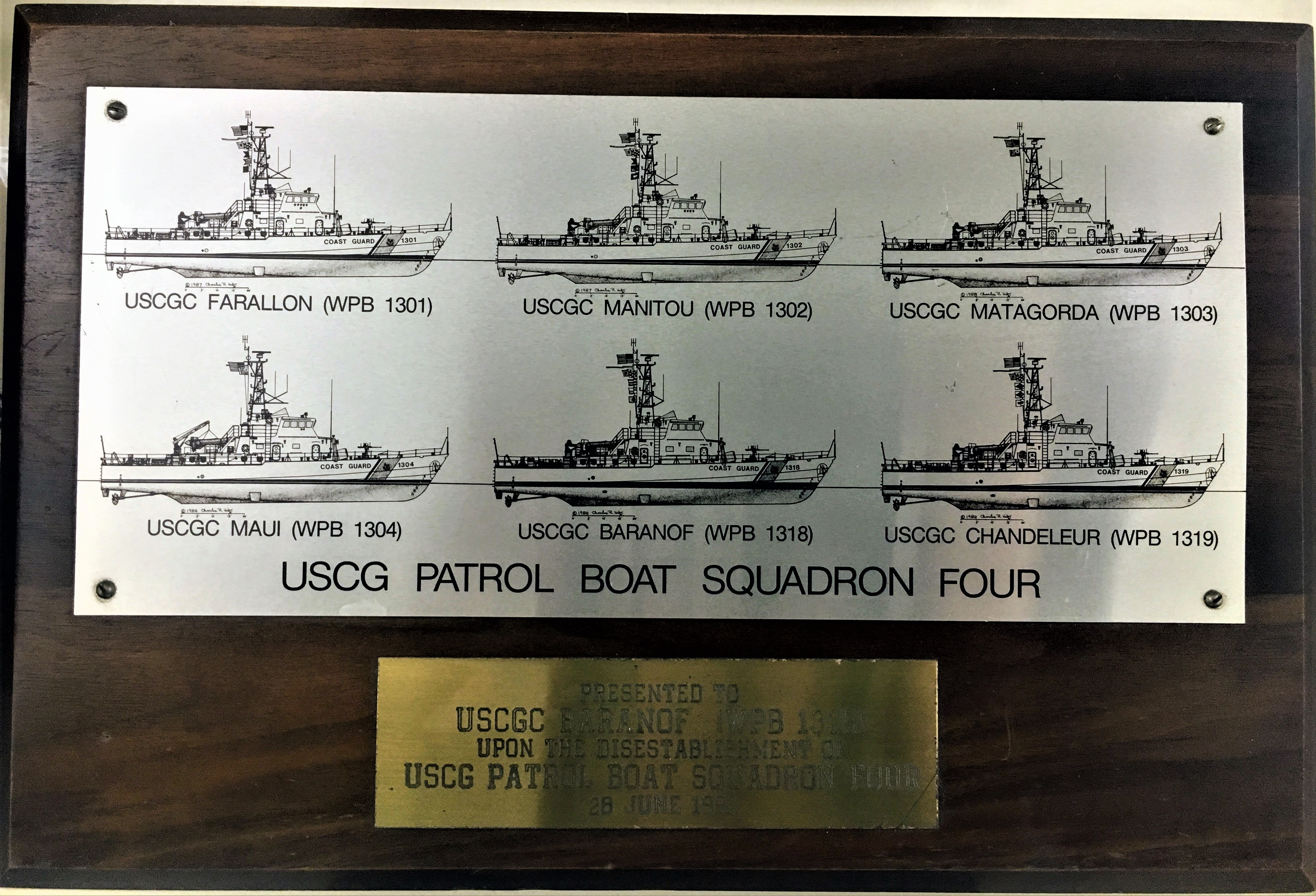
The cutters assigned to Coast Guard Patrol Boat Squadron Four.

=== CG Patrol Boat Squadron Two cutters ===
- USCGC MONHEGAN (WPB 1305)
- USCGC NUNIVAK (WPB 1306)
- USCGC OCRACOKE (WPB 1307)
- USCGC VASHON (WPB 1308)
- USCGC NANTUCKET (WPB 1316)

== Squadron staffs ==
Each Squadron had staffs assigned for administration, supply, and maintenance.

Squadron Commander: LCDR
Executive Officer: LT
Engineer Officer: ENG4
MKC	GMC	EMC
MK1	YN1	SK1
DC1	ET1	MK2
ET3		

Squadron ONE was commissioned 051600Z July 1985. Squadron ONE was under the operational and administrative control of Commander, Seventh Coast Guard District and homeported at Coast Guard Base Miami Beach, Florida. Squadron ONE was also designated Commanding Officer, Primary Crew Assembly Facility (PCAF) for the first 16 Island-class patrol boats.

Squadron TWO was commissioned 091847Z January 1986. Squadron TWO was under the operational control and administrative control of Greater Antilles Section (GANTSEC) homeported at U.S. Naval Base Roosevelt Roads, Puerto Rico.

== Naval integration ==
The two Squadrons were designed for expeditionary employment and ease of integration in naval operations. As such, each patrol boat was programmed for 2,850 annual operating hours, which was 1,050 hours more than non-Squadron Island-class patrol boats.

In April 1989, Commander, Atlantic Area forwarded a memorandum to Coast Guard Headquarters COMDT (G-OCU-2) regarding administrative means to improve naval integration. At issue was that the Navy used even numbers to designate Commander In Chief, Atlantic Fleet (CINCLANTFLT) units and odd numbers to designate Commander In Chief, Pacific Fleet (CINCPACFLT) units. As such, it was recommended to rename PATBOATRON ONE to PATBOATRON FOUR. Similarly, it was recommended to rename the C-130 Logistics Support Squadron 201 (VCC 201) to Squadron 204 (VCC 204). By renaming these units in accordance with Navy convention, Atlantic Area sought to reduce mobilization confusion during a time of crisis.

== Significant operations ==
- LA TOTO Drug Seizure. On May 8, 1987, the USCGC OCRACOKE made the largest cocaine seizure to date when it interdicted the 28-foot Dominican-flagged vessel La Toto with 1.9 tons of cocaine and five persons onboard.
- Operation BREAKOUT. Squadron One was awarded the Commandant's Meritorious Unit Commendation for Operation BREAKOUT.
- Operation Praying Mantis preparations. Between October 1987 and May 1988, the Coast Guard prepared to deploy assets to Bahrain to support U.S. Navy efforts in support of Operation Praying Mantis. This military operation escorted U.S. flagged merchant ships in the Persian Gulf. Initial plans called for four to six patrol boats and two SAR aircraft. The Commandant Admiral Paul Yost, Jr., a Coast Guard veteran of the Vietnam War, vigorously championed this effort. The plan was eventually adjusted to six patrol boats. Squadron Two was ordered to prepare to deploy. If this became a long-term mission, Squadron One would relieve Squadron Two after six months. The five Squadron Two cutters and staff, plus the USCGC AQUIDNECK (WBP 1309), homeported in Portsmouth, Virginia and USCGC NAUSHON (WPB 1311), homeported in Ketchikan, Alaska, were alerted. The Cape May, New Jersey–based USCGC MATINICUS (WPB 1315) was used as a template for engineering changes and operational planners to create the force deployment package. The deployment of Squadron Four and Two cutters never materialized due to logistical issues regarding crew composition.
- Trident II testing. Squadron Four cutters (USCGC CHANDELEUR, USCGC FARALLON, and USCGC MAUI) formed a surface action group with USCGC ALERT, USCGC CHEROKEE, USCGC DRUMMOND, and Station Cape Canaveral to provide security for USS TENNESSEE during 13–15 December 1989 during two successful Trident II missile launches.
- Hurricane HUGO recovery operations. A surface action group led by USCGC BEAR (WMEC 901) and consisting of USCGC MONHEGAN (WPB 1305), USCGC NUNIVAK (WPB 1307), USCGC OCRACOKE (WPB 1307), USCGC VASHON (WPB 1308), and USCGC NANTUCKET (WPB 1316) proceeded to the U.S. Virgin Islands to assess damages and provide humanitarian relief. At the direction of President George H. W. Bush, a boarding team from USCG VASHON (WPB 1308) went ashore in St. Croix, USVI to rescue 77 civilians barricaded in a hotel. Squadron Two staff were awarded the Commandant's Meritorious Unit Commendation for post-hurricane recovery operation in Puerto Rico.
- TRADEWINDS 90. USCGC DAUNTLESS and USCGC CHANDELEUR conducted training and operations with the Jamaica Defence Force Coast Guard and received a congratulatory note from the U.S. Embassy Kingston.

== Squadron decommissioning ==
The staffs of Squadrons FOUR and TWO were decommissioned on June 28, 1991, and July 1, 1991, respectively. The administrative control of their patrol boats was transferred to Commander, Group Miami Beach and Commander, Greater Antilles Section, respectively.

== See also ==
- Coast Guard Squadron One, Point-class 82-foot patrol boat Squadrons during the Vietnam War
