= Assateague (disambiguation) =

Assateague may refer to:

- The Assateague people, a Native American tribe
- Assateague Island, an Atlantic barrier island in Maryland and Virginia
- Assateague Light, a lighthouse located on the southern end of Assateague Island
- Assateague Island National Seashore, a unit of the National Park Service occupying much of Assateague Island
- USCGC Assateague, an Island-class cutter of the United States Coast Guard
