= USCGC Farallon =

U.S. Coast Guard vessel

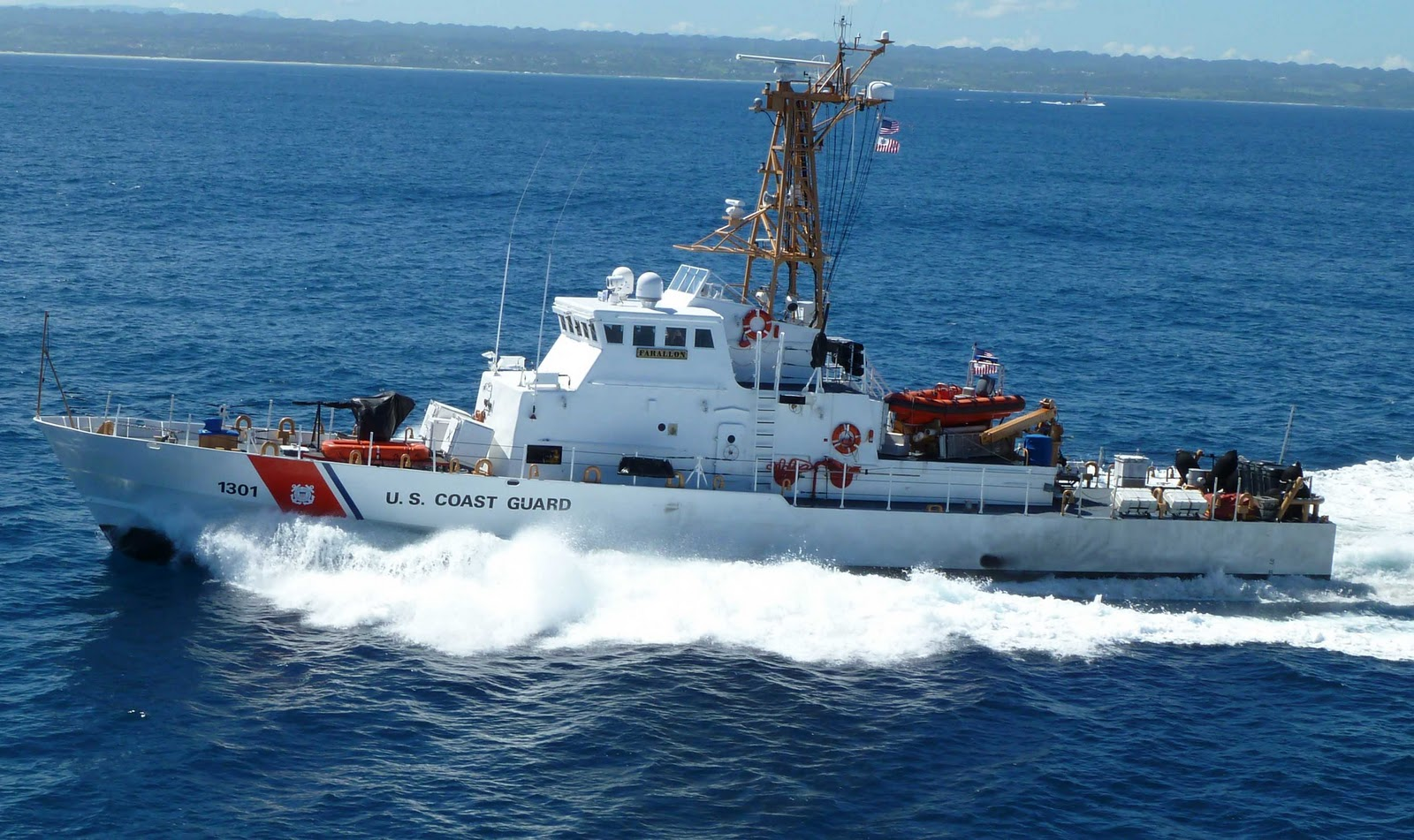
- USCGC Farallon

History

United States
- Name: USCGC Farallon
- Launched: 27 August 1985
- Commissioned: 21 February 1986
- Decommissioned: 2016
- Identification: IMO 4684971; MMSI number: 366999770; Callsign: NABK
- Status: decommissioned

General characteristics
- Class & type: Island-class patrol boat
- Displacement: 163 tons
- Length: 110 feet (34 m)
- Beam: 21 feet (6.4 m)
- Draft: 6.5 feet (2.0 m)
- Propulsion: 2 Paxman Valenta diesel engines
- Speed: 29.7 knots
- Complement: 2 officers, 14 enlisted
- Armament: Mk 38 25 mm chain gun; 2 × M2 .50-cal MG

USCGC Farallon (WPB-1301) is the lead ship of the Island-class cutters of the United States Coast Guard. She was launched in 1985. Farallon spent most of her career fighting drug smuggling and illegal immigration into Florida and Puerto Rico. In 2015 she was transferred to Valdez, Alaska before being decommissioned in 2016.

== Construction and characteristics ==
The Coast Guard began a process to replace its aging Cape-class cutters in late 1982. It determined that there was an urgent need for a new class of patrol boats to police drug smuggling and illegal immigration, particularly in the Caribbean and Southeastern United States. In order to speed procurement and lower risks and costs, the Coast Guard required bids for its new Island-class cutters to be based on existing patrol boat designs, rather than brand new designs.

On 11 May 1984 the Coast Guard awarded a $76 million contract to Marine Power Equipment Company of Seattle, Washington for the first 16 patrol boats. Bollinger Machine Shop and Shipyard, Inc. of Lockport, Louisiana, the losing bidder, sued in Federal court to have the award overturned. Bollinger argued that Marine Power had violated the contracting rules by substituting 12-cylinder engines for the 20-cylinder engines in the "Parent Craft" that it based its submission on. The court agreed, and set aside Marine Power's contract.

In August 1984 the Coast Guard awarded a $76.8 million contract to Bollinger for the first 16 cutters. Its design was based on the Vosper Thornycroft Ltd. 33 metres (108 ft) patrol boat. Farallon was the first of these vessels produced. Her keel was laid on 26 December 1984, and she was launched on 27 August 1985.

Farallon has an overall length of 110 feet (34 m), a beam of 21 feet (6.4 m), and a draft of 6.5 feet (2.0 m) at full load. The patrol boat has a displacement of 163 tons at full load. Her hull is constructed of high-strength steel, and her superstructure and main deck are constructed from aluminium. The ship has twin active fin stabilizers. A stern flap was retrofitted during the 2000s to reduce hull friction and increase speed and fuel efficiency.

Farallon is powered two Paxman Valenta 16 CM Diesel engines, each of which can deliver 2,880 brake horsepower. These drive two 5-bladed fixed-pitch propellers which are 49.6 inches (1.26 m) in diameter. At her maximum speed of 29.7 knots she has an unrefueled range of 900 nautical miles. Her range is 2,700 nautical miles at 12 knots. One of the early challenges with this propulsion package was that her minimum speed was 9 knots, which was too fast to safely tow some small boats.

She has two 99 kilowatts (135 PS; 133 shp) Caterpillar 3304T diesel generators for electrical power.

Farallon was originally armed with a Mark-67 20mm gun which was later replaced by a Mark-38 25 mm chain gun. She also carries two Browning .50 Caliber Machine Guns.

Farallon carries one 18-foot rigid hull inflatable boat with seating for 8 crew.

The ship has berthing accommodations for 2 officers, 2 chief petty officers, and 12 enlisted crew, plus two extra personnel. Her potable water tanks hold 900 U.S. gallons (3,400 L), and she has a water maker aboard which can desalinate 600 U.S. gallons (2,300 L) per day. Her at-sea endurance is calculated at 5 days, but the ship routinely exceeded this in her patrols in the Caribbean.

All of the Island-class cutters were named after American islands. Farallon's namesake is the Farallon Islands off the coast of San Francisco.

== Operational history ==
Farallon was dedicated in a ceremony on 31 July 1985 attended by more than 1,000 people at the Bollinger shipyard in Lockport, Louisiana. The keynote speaker was Vice President George H. W. Bush, who emphasized the importance of the new Island-class cutters in fighting drug smuggling. Also attending the event were Secretary of Transportation Elizabeth Dole, Coast Guard Commandant James S. Gracey, and former Louisiana Governor Dave Treen.

=== Service in Miami Beach and San Juan (1986–2015) ===
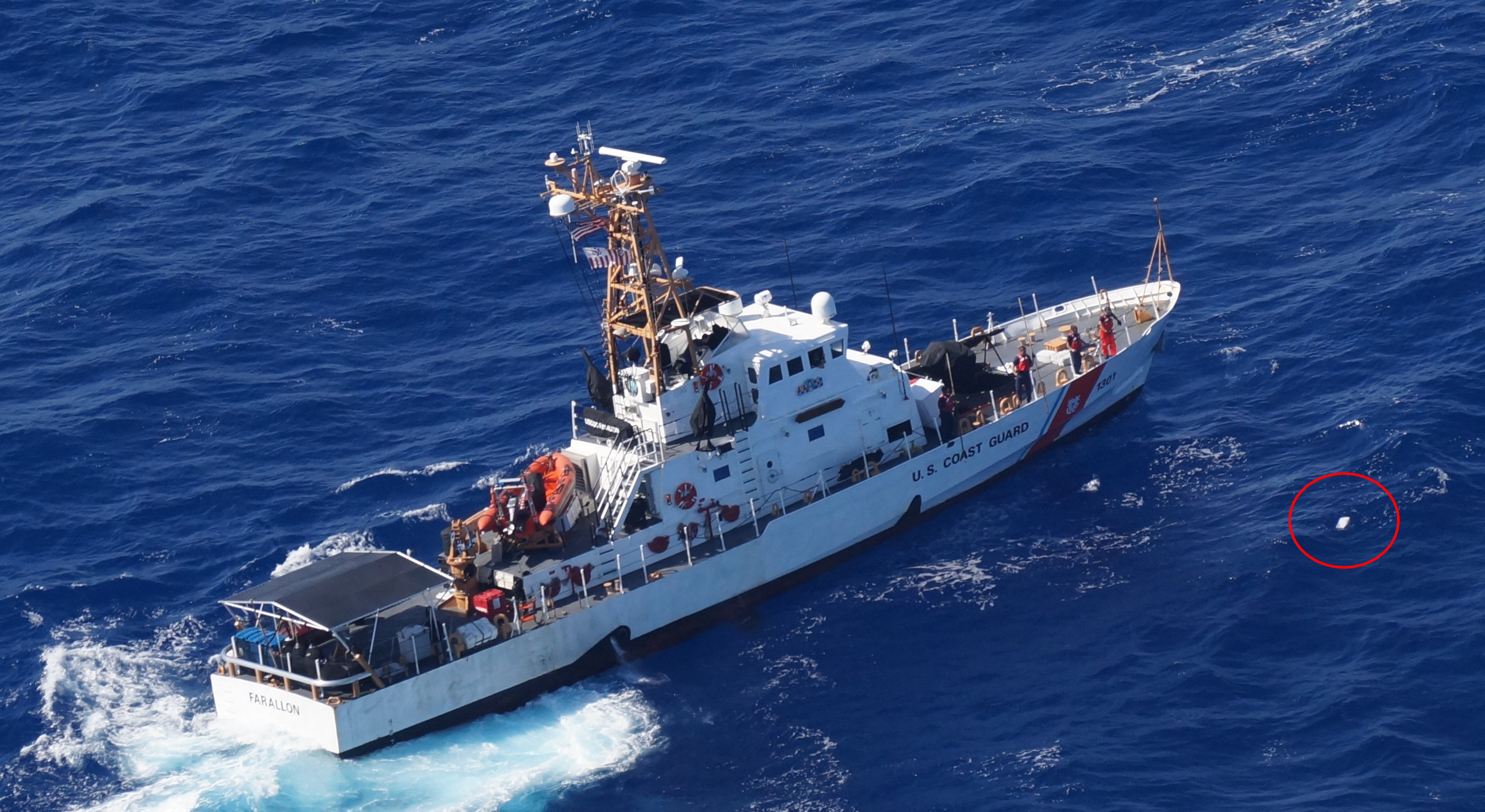
Farallon recovering brick of cocaine (circled in red) tossed overboard during an April 2014 drug bust

The ship was delivered to the Coast Guard on 15 November 1985. The first four ships of the Island-class, including Farallon, were assigned to Coast Guard Base Miami Beach to fight the drug trade and illegal immigration. Farallon arrived at her new base on 22 January 1986. She was commissioned on 21 February 1986. The four Island-class ships based at Miami Beach, including Farallon, were initially organized into a separate unit, Squadron One, to centralize command, control, maintenance, and support functions, as well as to integrate more smoothly into joint operations with U.S. Navy formations. The separate staff of Squadron One, which was later renamed Squadron Four for administrative reasons, was disestablished on 28 June 1991, but Farallon remained homeported at Miami Beach and under the command of the 7th Coast Guard District. In 2009 the ship was reassigned to San Juan, Puerto Rico, but she remained focused on drug interdiction and stopping illegal immigration.

Just as George Bush had promised at Farallon's dedication ceremony, one of the ship's primary missions while based in Miami Beach and San Juan was to stop the smuggling of illegal drugs. She was notably successful in this role, confiscating tons of contraband.

Some of Farallon's drug interdiction operations
Date	Location	Contraband seized	Arrests	Notes
4 March 1987	SE of Miami	7,000 pounds marijuana	8	
25 August 1987	Off Haiti	7 tons marijuana	10	
23 November 1989	SE of Miami	900 pounds cocaine	2	
18 May 1990	S of Andros Island	1,430 pounds of cocaine	4	In conjunction with Bahamian Defense Force
14 April 2009	US Virgin Islands	250 kg of cocaine	2	In conjunction with USCGC Reef Shark
3 September 2010	S of Dominican Republic	2,035 pounds of cocaine		
1 August 2012	E of Puerto Rico	450 kg of cocaine	2	
30 April 2014	S of Puerto Rico	1,125 kg of cocaine		In conjunction with USCGC Drummond
27 July 2014	NW of Aquadillia	300 pounds of cocaine	3	

A second mission was to stop illegal immigration into South Florida. As many of the immigrant vessels were unseaworthy and desperately overcrowded, these often became search and rescue missions. Farallon returned 112 Haitians to their home country after intercepting them on a 45-foot (14-meter) sailboat in May 1986. Five Cubans found floating in inner tubes 35 miles south of Key West were rescued by Farallon in December 1991. In June 1993, Farallon intercepted a 25-foot (8-meter) sailboat with 43 Dominicans aboard off Miami Beach. During the 1994 Cuban rafter crisis, Farallon picked up more than 600 refugees from the Straits of Florida. Farallon intercepted a 60-foot (18-meter) wooden boat with 411 people aboard, mostly Haitians, on 1 January 2000. In December 2001, Farallon and USCGC Chandeleur resucued 185 Haitian immigrants from a 31-foot (9-meter) sailboat that was sinking off Elliot Key. Over the course of her career she found thousands of people trying to enter the United States.

A third mission was search and rescue. She was ofter called upon to assist recreational vessels in distress. On 30 July 1986 there was a more high-profile event, an explosion and fire on the cruise ship Emerald Seas, anchored near Little Stirrup Cay in The Bahamas. The Coast Guard mobilized four aircraft and three vessels, including Farallon to respond to the incident. Farallon put a boarding party aboard the ship.

The ship was also detailed to a number of special missions. In December 1989, the USS Tennessee test fired two Trident II missiles off the Florida coast. A force of six Coast Guard ships, including Farallon, five Navy ships, and several aircraft were mobilized to provide security for the test. The ship was dispatched to Haiti in 1994 and 1995 to provide maritime security for American and international forces participating in Operation Uphold Democracy and Operation Secure Tomorrow.

Karl L. Schultz, later to serve as Commandant of the Coast Guard, was Farallon's commanding officer from June 1989 to July 1991.

=== Service at Valdez (2015–2016) ===
As early as the mid-2000s, the mechanical reliability of the aging Island-class ships became an issue. The Coast Guard began retiring these cutters in 2012, replacing them with Sentinel-class fast-response cutters. As the new ships were commissioned, some of the Island-class patrol boats were shuffled between bases. Farallon sailed from San Juan on 27 May 2015 for her new homeport at Valdez, Alaska. She arrived there on 13 July 2015 and replaced USCGC Long Island, which sailed to the Coast Guard Yard to be decommissioned. Farallon's crew were given new assignments and Long Island's crew, which was familiar with local waters, took over the ship.

The Coast Guard decommissioned Farallon in 2016.

== Awards and honors ==
Farallon earned six Coast Guard Meritorious Unit Commendations between 1989 and 1993. She earned the Armed Forces Expeditionary Medal for Operation Uphold Democracy and Operation Secure Tomorrow, both in Haiti, in 1994–1995.
