= Island-class patrol boat =

Class of cutters of the U.S. Coast Guard

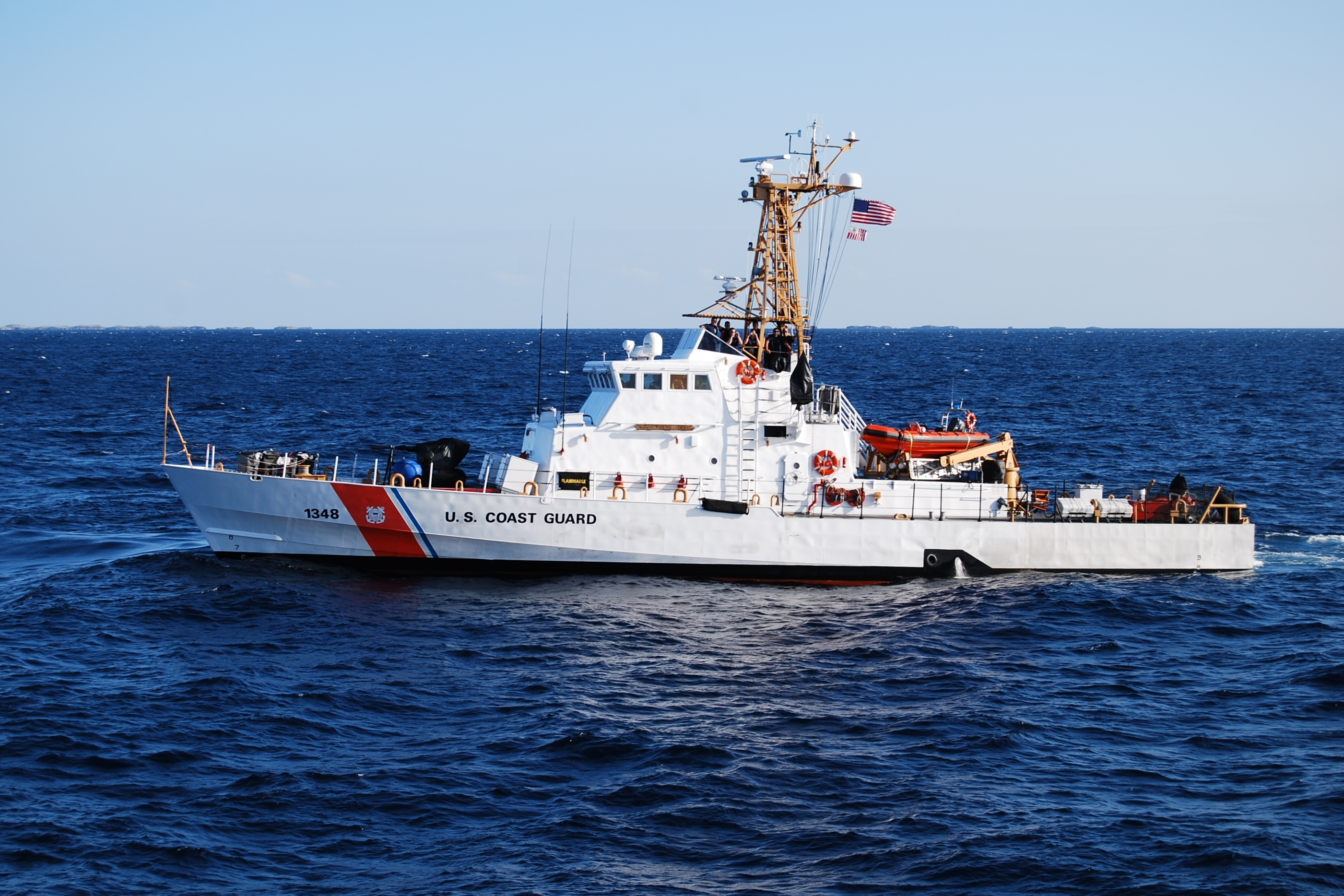
- USCGC Knight Island

Class overview
- Name: Island class
- Builders: Bollinger Shipyards, Lockport, Louisiana, U.S.
- Operators: United States Coast Guard (former); Coast Guard of Georgia; Costa Rica Coast Guard; Colombian National Navy; Hellenic Navy; Pakistan Navy; Ukrainian Navy; Tunisian National Navy
- Preceded by: Cape-class
- Succeeded by: Sentinel-class
- Completed: 49

General characteristics of A-series as built
- Type: Patrol boat
- Displacement: 163 tons
- Length: 110 ft (34 m)
- Beam: 21 ft (6.4 m)
- Draft: 7.3 ft (2.2 m)
- Speed: 29.7 kn (55.0 km/h; 34.2 mph)
- Range: 1,882 nmi (3,485 km; 2,166 mi) @ 26 knots
- Endurance: 5 days
- Complement: 16 (2 officers, 14 enlisted)
- Armament: Originally: Mark 16 20mm cannon; 2 × M60 7.62 NATO machine gun; Later upgraded to: Mk 38 25mm cannon; 2 x M2 machine guns

The Island-class patrol boat is a class of cutters of the United States Coast Guard. Forty-nine of these boats were launched between 1985 and 1992, and while all have been retired from American service, several continue to serve in a number of foreign coast guards and navies.

The Island class was initiated during the Reagan administration, which regarded it as an important tool in the war on drugs. The early ships in the class were deployed to Florida, Puerto Rico and other ports in the Southeast United States and were somewhat successful in drug interdiction efforts. As more ships were built, the class was deployed throughout the United States and replaced obsolete cutters. They undertook the full range of Coast Guard missions, including search and rescue, fisheries enforcement, migrant and drug interdiction, and military operations.

The ships were deployed around the world. In 2003, eight of the Island-class boats were transferred to the Mediterranean and Persian Gulf to assist the United States Navy's 5th and 6th Fleets in Operation Iraqi Freedom, and six were permanently assigned to Bahrain after the war.

The Island-class boats served well past their original 15-year design life and were replaced in the U.S. Coast Guard fleet by Sentinel-class cutters. Over a dozen decommissioned ships have been transferred to allied navies and coast guards and continue on active duty.

== Origins and contracting ==
The Coast Guard began a process to replace its aging Point-class and Cape-class cutters in late 1982. It determined that there was an urgent need for replacement ships in order to police drug smuggling and illegal immigration, particularly in the Caribbean and Southeastern United States. In order to speed procurement and lower risks and costs, the Coast Guard required bids for its new Island-class cutters to be based on existing patrol boats, rather than brand new designs.

In choosing a military patrol boat design for the class, the Coast Guard explicitly prioritized performance over longevity. The drug smugglers of the 1980s were using high-performance motorboats to speed past law-enforcement vessels meant to interdict them. The 30-knot performance of the Island class vessels was achieved by powering a light hull with large engines. The hull was made light, in part, by using relatively thin steel. This thinner steel had less reserve to accommodate the inevitable corrosion, and had consequences throughout the class's life. The Coast Guard expected the service life of these vessels to be 15 years.

On 11 May 1984 the Coast Guard awarded a $76 million contract to Marine Power Equipment Company of Seattle, Washington for the first 16 patrol boats. Its bid was based on an existing Korean patrol boat produced by the Dae Woo Shipbuilding. Bollinger Machine Shop and Shipyard, Inc. of Lockport, Louisiana, the losing bidder, sued in Federal court to have the award overturned. Bollinger argued that Marine Power had violated the contracting rules by substituting 12-cylinder engines for the 20-cylinder engines in the "Parent Craft" that it based its submission on. The court agreed, and set aside Marine Power's contract.

In August 1984 the Coast Guard awarded a $76.8 million contract to Bollinger for the first 16 cutters. These became the A-series ships. Bollinger's design was based on the Vosper Thornycroft Ltd. 33 metres (108 ft) patrol boat. Farallon was the first of these vessels produced. Her keel was laid on 26 December 1984.

Bollinger owned the exclusive license to build the Vosper Thornycroft design, which precluded other American shipyards from bidding on subsequent contracts for Island-class ships. In order to allow for competition, the government purchased the license from Bollinger for $5.5 million and then solicited bids for an additional 16 ships with options for 17 more. Bollinger was awarded this second contract, which had a face value of $99.3 million for the 16 firm orders, in February 1987. Shortly thereafter, options on five additional boats were exercised with $31 million of funding provided by the Anti-Drug Abuse Act of 1986. The final twelve cutters were funded in the FY 1990 Department of Defense budget.

== Construction and characteristics ==
All of the ships in the Island class were built at Bollinger's Lockport, Louisiana shipyard. The hulls were built of welded steel plates, while the main deck and superstructure was built of aluminum to save weight. The hull form was a round-bottomed, semi-displacement design. The ships are 110 feet (34 m) long overall, with a beam of 21 feet (6.4 m), and a full-load draft of 7.3 feet (2.2 m). The full-load displacement of the A-series boats was 163 tons.

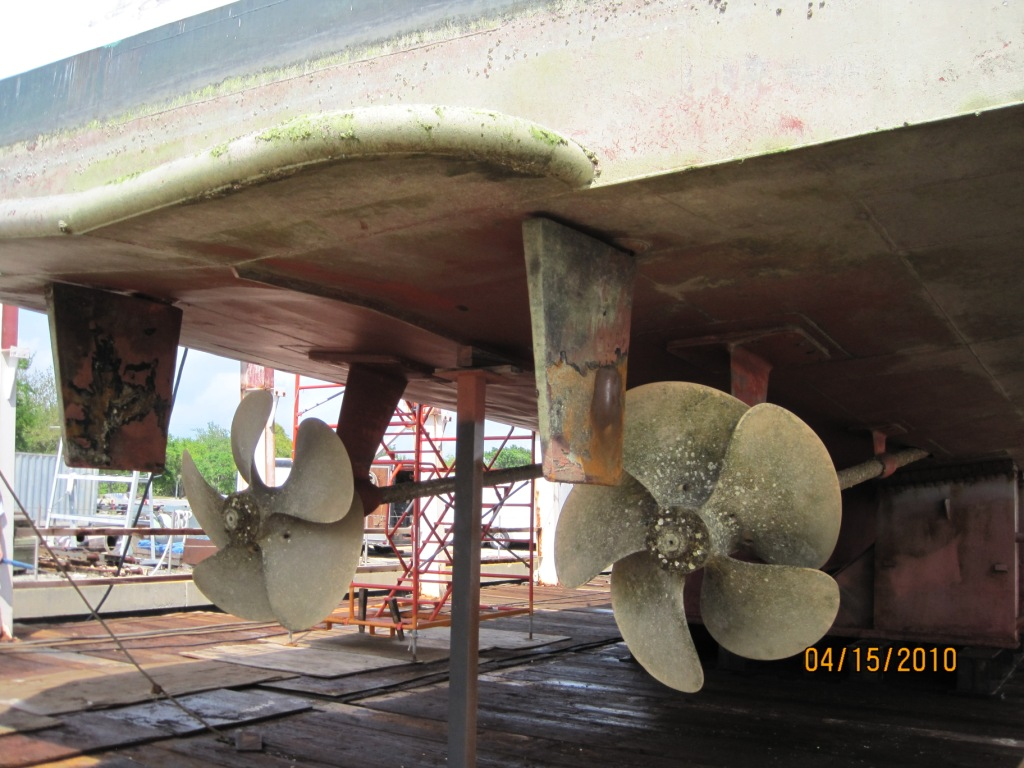
Propellers, rudders, and stern flap on Block Island

Propulsion is provided by two fixed-pitch, five-bladed propellers which are 49.6 inches (126 cm) diameter. In the A and B-series boats, these were driven by two 16-cylinder Paxman Valenta 16-CM RP200M Diesel engines, each of which could generate 2,880 continuous horsepower. In the C-series boats, the main engines installed were Caterpillar 3516 Diesel engines rated at 2,730 horsepower. One of the challenges with the propulsion package on A and B-series boats was that their minimum speed was 9 knots, which was too fast to safely tow some small boats. The Caterpillar engines in the C-series boats lowered the minimum speed to 4 knots, solving this search and rescue limitation. All configurations had ZF gearboxes installed between the engines and the 4-inch diameter propeller shafts, and twin rudders were located aft of the twin propellers.

Electrical power aboard was produced by two Caterpillar 3304T Diesel generators, each capable of producing 99 Kw.

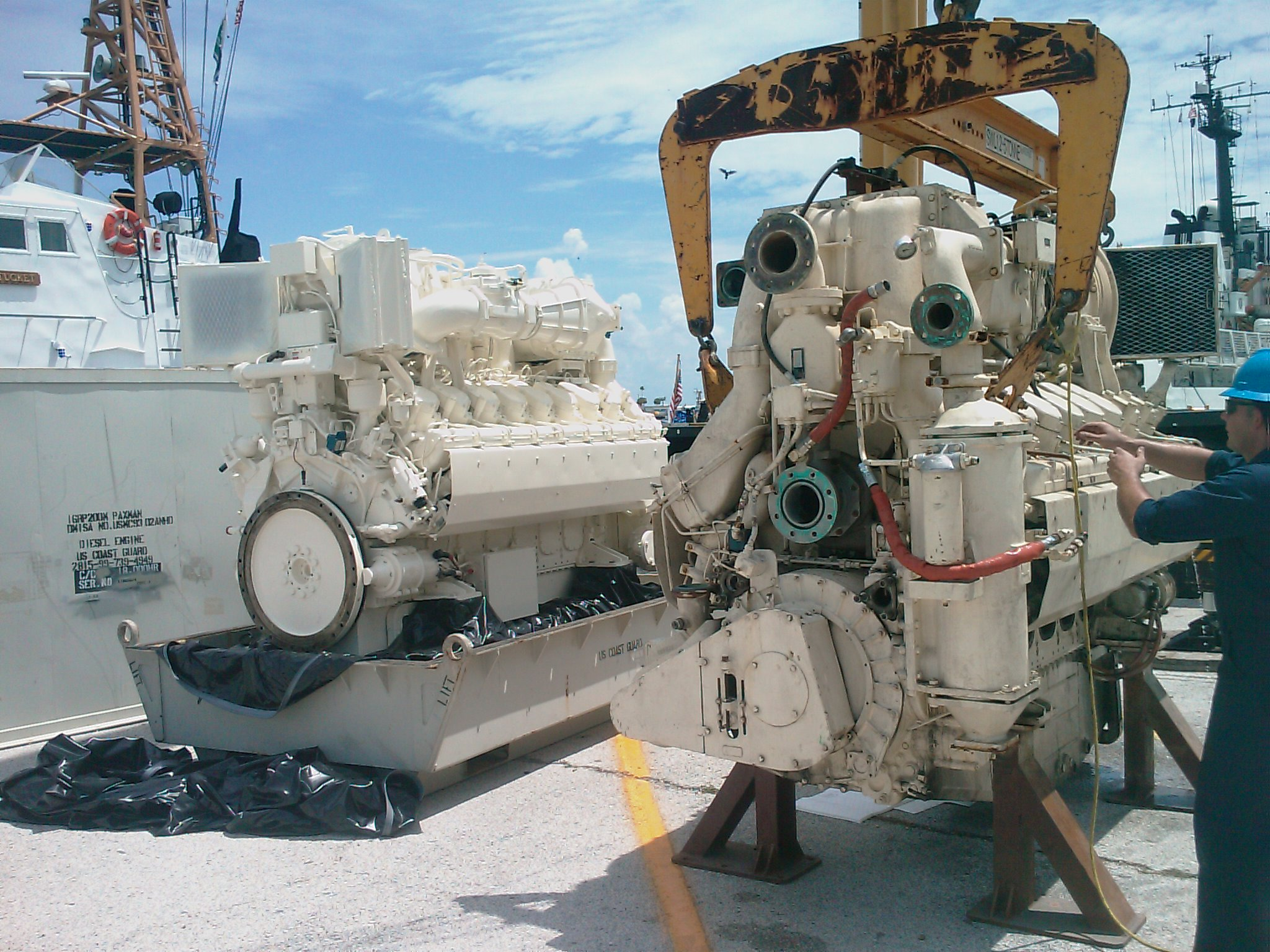
Nantucket suffered a breakdown which required a new Paxman Valenta main engine

Total capacity of the ships' fuel tanks was 10,600 US gallons (40,000 L) which gave them an unrefeuled range of 1,882 miles running at 26 knots. The potable water tanks aboard held 900 US gallons (3,400 L). Water makers were installed which could produce 600 US gallons (2,300 L) of potable water per day. There were also tanks for sewage, gray water, lubrication oil, dirty oil, and oily water.

All Island-class boats were equipped with an active fin stabilization system to reduce rolling while underway. Each of the two fins were 3 feet (0.91 m) tall and had 40 square feet (3.7 m^{2}) of wetted surface.

The A and B-series were originally armed with a Mark 16 20mm cannon on the foredeck and two M60 machine guns. As originally designed, the cutters had 10 tons of weight reservations for additional weapons. Some of this was used when the Mk 38 25mm cannon was installed on the C-series boats instead of the 20mm weapon. The rest of the class was upgraded to the larger gun beginning in FY 1990. Similarly, the M60 machine guns were upgraded to M2 machine guns on all ships.

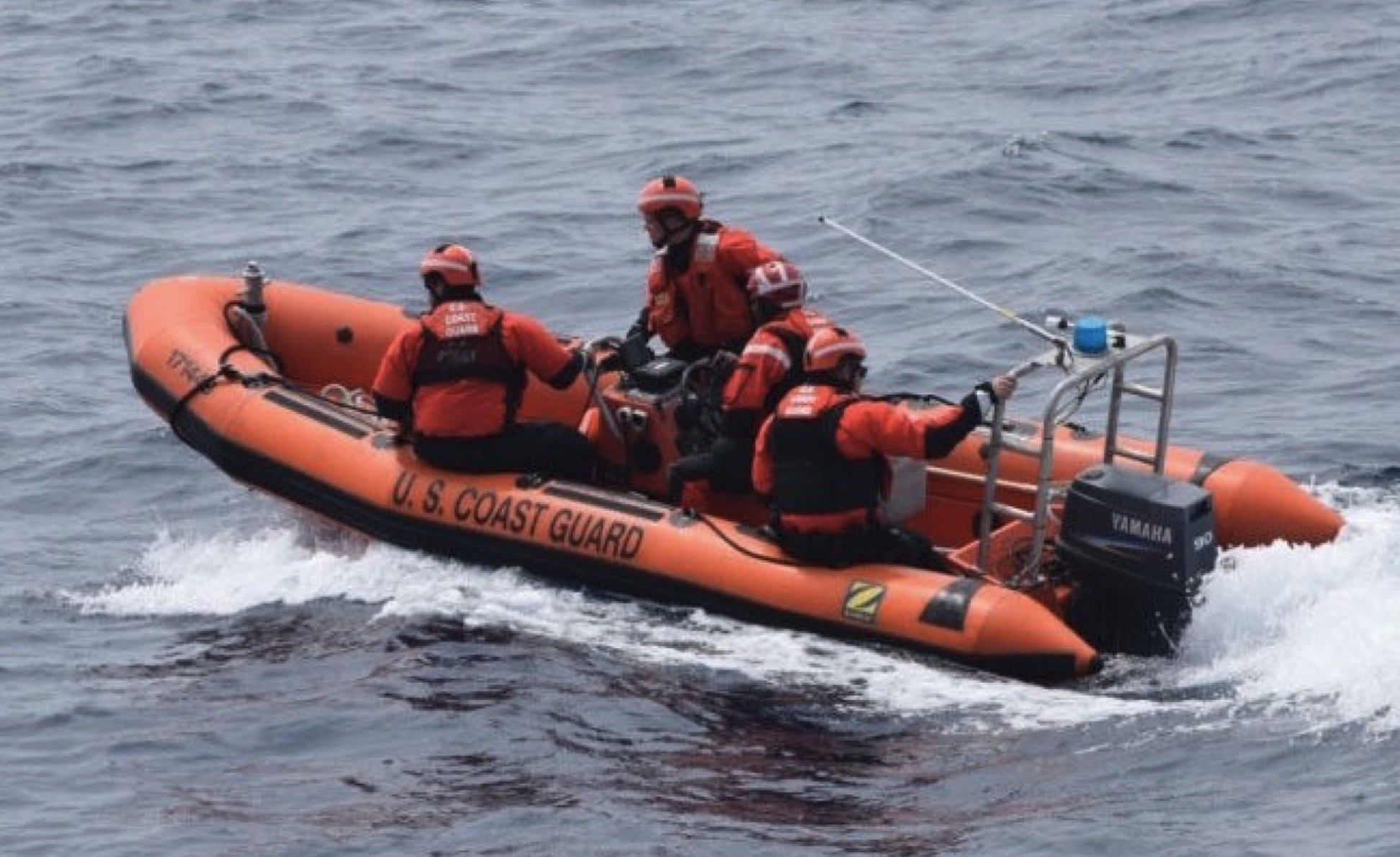
Cutter boat -medium deployed on Island-class boats

An Avon Searider boarding boat was stowed on a raised section above the engine room. In the late 1990's these were replaced by a cutter boat - medium built by Zodiac of North America. This boat was a rigid inflatable 18.3 feet (5.6 m) long with a beam of 7.5 feet (2.3 m). It was propelled by a 90 horsepower Yamaha outboard engine and could achieve a maximum speed of 33 knots. The boats could be launched on either side of the ship using an Appleton Marine crane which had a working capacity of 1,750 pounds (790 kg).

As originally built, the ships had accommodations for two officers, two petty officers, and twelve enlisted men, with two extra bunks for visitors. There was a galley and mess. The boats which served in Bahrain as part of Patrol Forces Southwest were equipped with additional berths to accommodate the embarked law enforcement detachments which boarded suspect boats.

== Variants and modifications ==
=== A-series (WPB 1301–1316) ===
Coast Guard requirements resulted in a larger bow fuel tank than in the original Thorneycraft design. Bollinger moved a bulkhead aft by two feet to accommodate the larger tank. When the tank was full and a ship was running at higher speeds into a head sea, A-series cutters experienced cracking in their steel bow plating. The affected steel was specified at 4 pounds per square foot, which meant that it was less than .125 inches (3.2 mm) thick. This issue was resolved by reinforcing the original bow plating and by avoiding the operating conditions that produced the cracking. Nationally-syndicated columnist Jack Anderson criticized this problem and other aspects of Island-class procurement.

=== B-series (WPB 1317–1337) ===
B-series cutters were built with heavier bow plating to avoid the hull cracking experienced in the A-series.

=== C-series (WPB 1338–1349) ===
Bollinger submitted a Value Engineering Change Proposal to the U.S. Navy, which administered the Island-class construction contract on behalf of the Coast Guard, to change the Paxman Valenta main engines for Caterpillar engines on the last twelve ships. The Navy accepted this proposal. The Caterpillar engines were cheaper to buy and maintain, were 3.3 tons lighter, and more fuel efficient. The greater fuel efficiency increased the range of the C-series vessels. An additional operational benefit was that the Caterpillar engines were equipped with a trolling clutch, reducing the minimum speed to 4 knots, allowing the C-series to safely tow small boats. The Caterpillar engines were also made in America, unlike the Paxman engines.

Comparison of Island-class patrol boat series
	A-series	B-series	C-series
Full-load displacement	163 tons	157 tons	153 tons
Main engines	Paxman Valenta 16-CM RP200M	Paxman Valenta 16-CM RP200M	Caterpillar 3516
Maximum speed	29.7 knots	29.7 knots	28 knots
Unrefueled range	900 nm at 29.7 knots 2,700 nm at 12 knots	900 nm at 29.7 knots 2,700 nm at 12 knots	840 nm at 28 knots 2,400 nm at 12 knots
Main armament	20-mm gun mk 67, converted to 25-mm Bushmaster cannon Mk 38	20-mm mk 67 gun, converted to 25-mm Bushmaster cannon Mk 38	25-mm Bushmaster cannon Mk 38

=== 110/123 conversion program ===
In the early 1990s, the Coast Guard faced the obsolescence of several ship and aircraft types which worked in offshore waters. Replacement of these assets would take decades and billions of dollars. It developed the Integrated Deepwater System Program to recapitalize its fleet over 25 years. The prime contract for the Deepwater program was awarded on 25 June 2002 to Integrated Coast Guard Systems, a joint venture of Northrup Grumman and Lockheed Martin.

The Deepwater program was constrained to a maximum expenditure of $500 million per year. Given the other priorities of the program, replacement of the Island-class patrol boats was not possible within the budgetary constraints of the early years. As an interim measure, Integrated Coast Guard Systems proposed to substantially modify Island-class cutters to upgrade their capabilities and extend their lives until the mid-2010s when fast response cutters were planned to replace them. The conversions were to be executed under subcontract by a joint venture between Bollinger and Halter Marine.

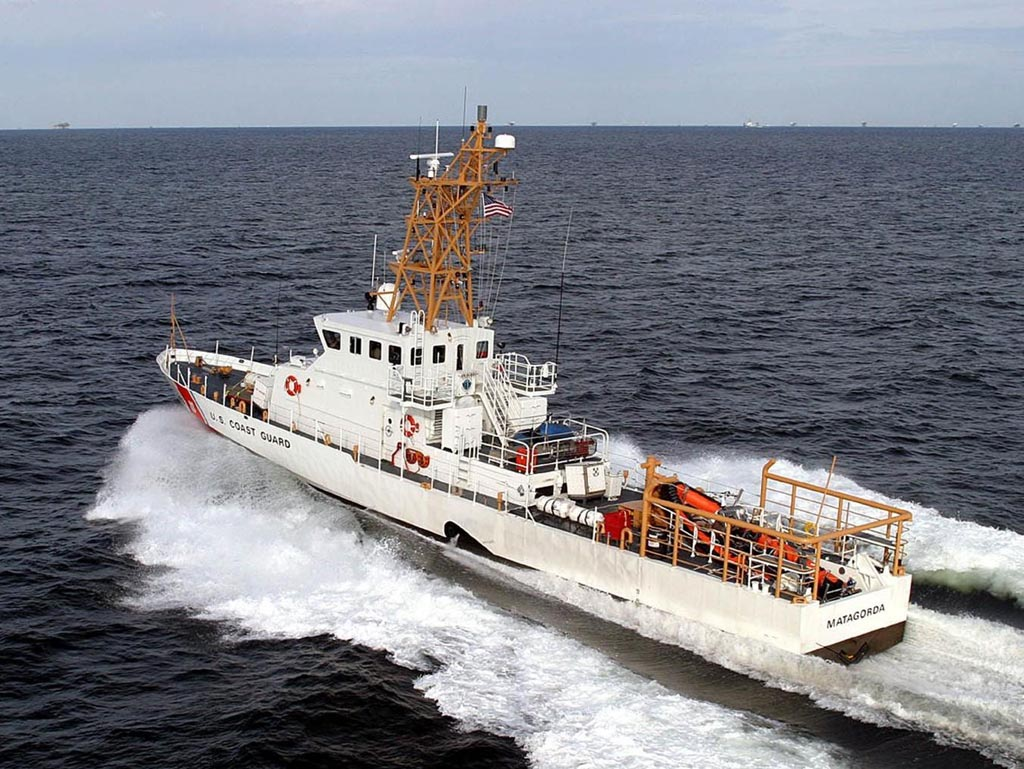
Matagorda after conversion to 123'

Major conversion work included replacing rusted hull plates, adding 13 feet (4.0 m) to the stern to make room for a high-speed stern launching ramp, replacing the superstructure to give the bridge better visibility and to accommodate mixed-gender crews, and updated electronics. The refit added about 15 tons to the vessel's displacement, and reduced its maximum speed by approximately one knot. The eight cutters modified were;

- USCGC Matagorda (WPB-1303)
- USCGC Attu (WPB-1317)
- USCGC Metompkin (WPB-1325)
- USCGC Padre (WPB-1328)
- USCGC Manitou (WPB-1302)
- USCGC Monhegan (WPB-1305)
- USCGC Nunivak (WPB-1306)
- USCGC Vashon (WPB-1308)

The specification for the converted patrol boats included unrestricted speed up through sea state 3, or seas averaging less than 4 feet (1.2 m). In September 2004, Matagorda made a high-speed transit to avoid Hurricane Ivan, in seas which may have exceeded the design specification. Her hull buckled during the trip. After extensive study, the hulls of the converted patrol boats were reinforced. In 2006, Nunivak experienced hull deformation while underway aft of the area which had been reinforced. The reason for this failure could not be determined.

In 2005, Coast Guard Commandant Admiral Thomas H. Collins made the decision to stop the conversion program at eight hulls. Sea trials revealed that structural flaws and the corrosion of the thin steel hulls made the conversions more expensive and riskier. The Coast Guard spent $95 million on the failed conversion program. The eight ships which had already been converted were restricted in their operations as a crew safety measure.

In August 2006, a Lockheed Martin engineer went public with allegations of flaws in the conversion project, which the company and Coast Guard had ignored. The Inspector General of the Department of Homeland Security investigated and agreed that the company had failed to use smokeless cabling and deployed electronics which did not meet the minimum temperature specifications.

On 30 November 2006 all eight of the converted patrol boats were taken out of service due to debilitating problems with their lengthened hulls. They were moved to the United States Coast Guard Yard and permanently decommissioned in December 2006. There they were stripped of reusable parts, and then sent to be scrapped.

The failure of the conversion program was costly and embarrassing for the Coast Guard, and it sought legal action against Bollinger. On 14 May 2006 the Department of Justice issued a litigation hold letter to Bollinger advising it that an investigation had been opened. On 17 June 2006 the Coast Guard revoked its acceptance of the eight converted cutters. The United States sued Bollinger on 29 July 2011 for $38.6 million in damages. This case was dismissed by the district court. On appeal, the fifth circuit court of appeals reversed the district court in December 2014, and remanded the case for further action. In 2015 the matter was settled with an $8.5 million payment from Bollinger.

=== Fleet modifications ===
A 1999 study indicated that a properly-sized stern flap might raise the maximum speed and fuel efficiency of the Island-class boats with a payback period of less than one year based on fuel savings. The flap raised the stern at higher speeds so that the boats could plane with less resistance. Stern flaps were installed on all the boats.

Seventeen Island-class boats were renovated under a Mission Effectiveness Program which extended their lives until the Sentinel class could be delivered. The work included replacing rusted hull plating, overhauling the main engines, and replacing the generators, air conditioners, water makers, and fire suppression systems. The renovations were stopped in 2012 due to budget constraints.

== Service history ==
=== Drug interdiction ===
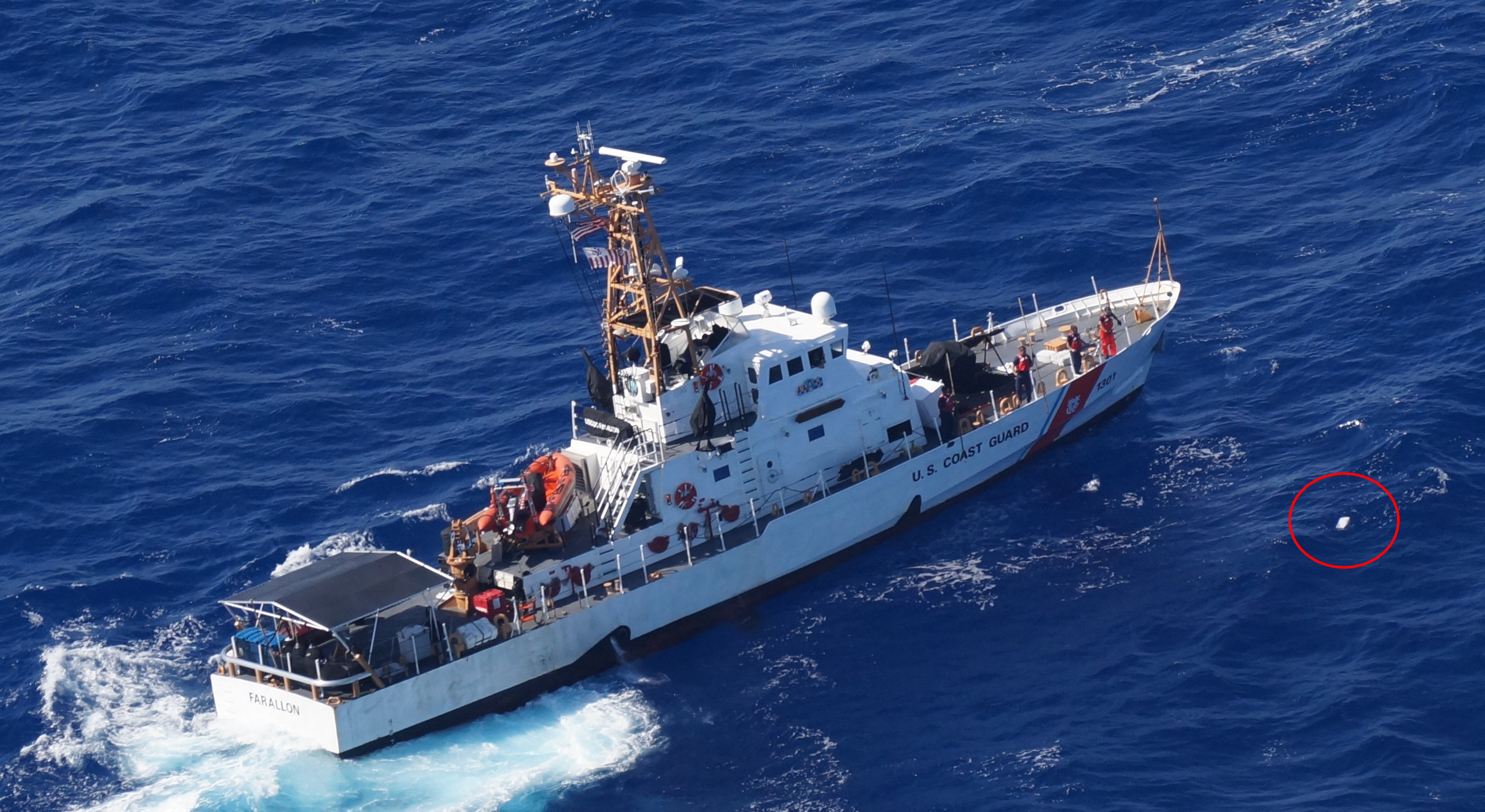
Farallon recovering a brick of cocaine thrown overboard by smugglers

The first four Island-class boats commissioned were assigned to Squadron One in Miami, and the second four were assigned to Squadron Two in Roosevelt Roads, Puerto Rico. All of these boats were additional resources intended to interdict drug smuggling into the southeastern United States. Armed with the new ships, the Coast Guard was somewhat successful in this mission, seizing tons of drugs headed to the United States by sea. On 5 October 1989 Cushing seized over six tons of cocaine, the largest amount ever taken at sea up to that point. The interdiction campaign caused the smugglers to try new tactics. They experimented with overflying American forces in the Caribbean to air drop drugs nearer the coast where they could be taken ashore more quickly. For example, in May 1990 a plane dropped 1,430 pounds of cocaine to a fishing boat near Andros Island. Farallon and Sitkanak coordinated with Bahamian authorities to seize the vessel. While interdicting drug smuggling into the Southeast United States was an early priority for Island-class cutters, these missions took place throughout the fleet. For example, in December 2013 Edisto seized more than 7,000 pounds (3,200 kg) of marijuana south of San Diego.

=== Caribbean migrants ===
There were several migration crises and efforts to control illegal immigration in the Caribbean in which the Island class featured prominently. As many of the immigrant vessels were unseaworthy and desperately overcrowded, these often became search and rescue missions. The history of Farallon was typical. Farallon returned 112 Haitians to their home country after intercepting them on a 45-foot (14-meter) sailboat in May 1986. Five cubans found floating in inner tubes 35 miles south of Key West were rescued by Farallon in December 1991. In June 1993, Farallon intercepted a 25-foot (8-meter) sailboat with 43 Dominicans aboard off Miami Beach. During the 1994 Cuban rafter crisis, Farallon picked up more than 600 refugees from the Straits of Florida. Farallon intercepted a 60-foot (18-meter) wooden boat with 411 people aboard, mostly Haitians, on 1 January 2000. In December 2001, Farallon and Chandeleur rescued 185 Haitian immigrants from a 31-foot (9-meter) sailboat that was sinking off Elliot Key. The Island-class boats intercepted thousands of people trying to reach the United States by sea.

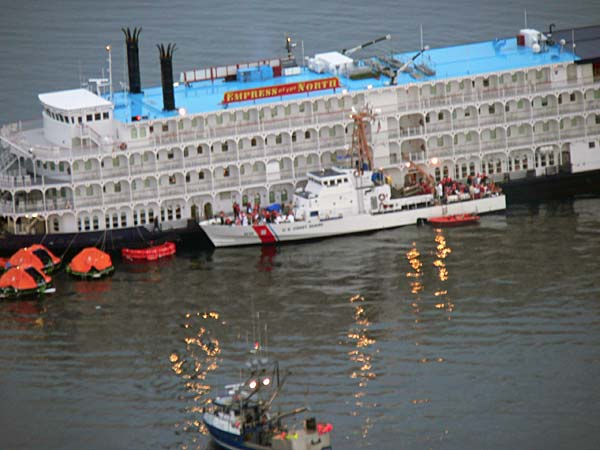
Liberty rescuing passengers from the grounded Empress of the North in 2007

=== Search and rescue ===
Island-class cutters were a primary search and rescue tool throughout the United States. The thousands of missions on which they were dispatched ranged from a single lost boater to entire cruise ships. The history of Liberty gives a sense for the search and rescue missions Island-class boats performed. In September 2001, Liberty rescued five crewmen from the fishing vessel Baranof Queen, which had been disabled off Cape Spencer. After the 38-foot (11.6 m) salmon-fishing vessel Belle-Tech was wrecked on the Gilanta Rocks in Dixon Entrance on 19 July 1999, Liberty rescued her crew of two, which had abandoned ship in a small boat. Liberty took eight people off the beached charter yacht Alaskan Song in 2001. On 15 May 2007, the sternwheel cruise ship Empress of the North went aground on Hanus Reef at the eastern entrance of Icy Strait. She had 281 passengers and crew aboard. Liberty, the ferry Columbia, and a number of nearby fishing boats responded. Liberty took off about 130 passengers and transferred them to Columbia.

=== Environmental protection ===
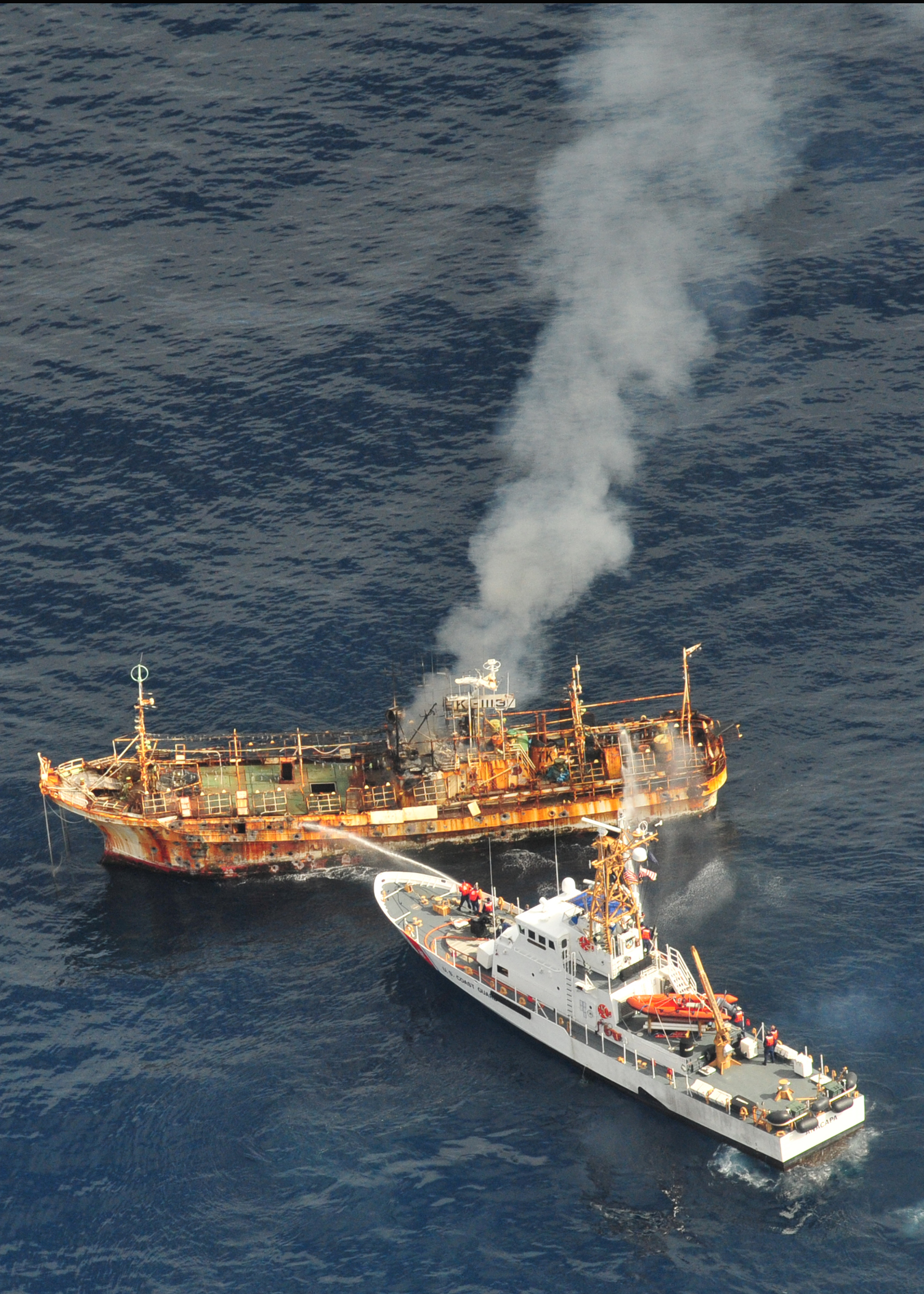
Anacapa sinking Ryou-Un Maru in 2012 before she could damage the coast

The Coast Guard mission to protect the American coast includes protecting it from environmental degradation. Island-class cutters were often called upon to protect the marine environment. Staten Island and Block Island each released juvenile sea turtles offshore as part of an effort to protect the species.

On 5 April 2012, Anacapa intercepted the derelict 165-foot (50 m) Japanese squid fishing boat Ryou-Un Maru 180 miles (290 km) off the coast of Southeast Alaska. It had been washed away from its mooring in Aomori Prefecture, Japan by the March 2011 Tōhoku earthquake and tsunami and had drifted, unmanned, for more than a year across the Pacific Ocean. The Coast Guard concluded that it was safer to sink it deep water rather than let it continue to drift and possibly become a hazard to navigation or the environment. The Anacapa fired on the ghost ship with her 25mm cannon, holing it and eventually sinking it with fire hoses in approximately 6,000-feet (1,800 meters) of water.

=== Overseas operations ===
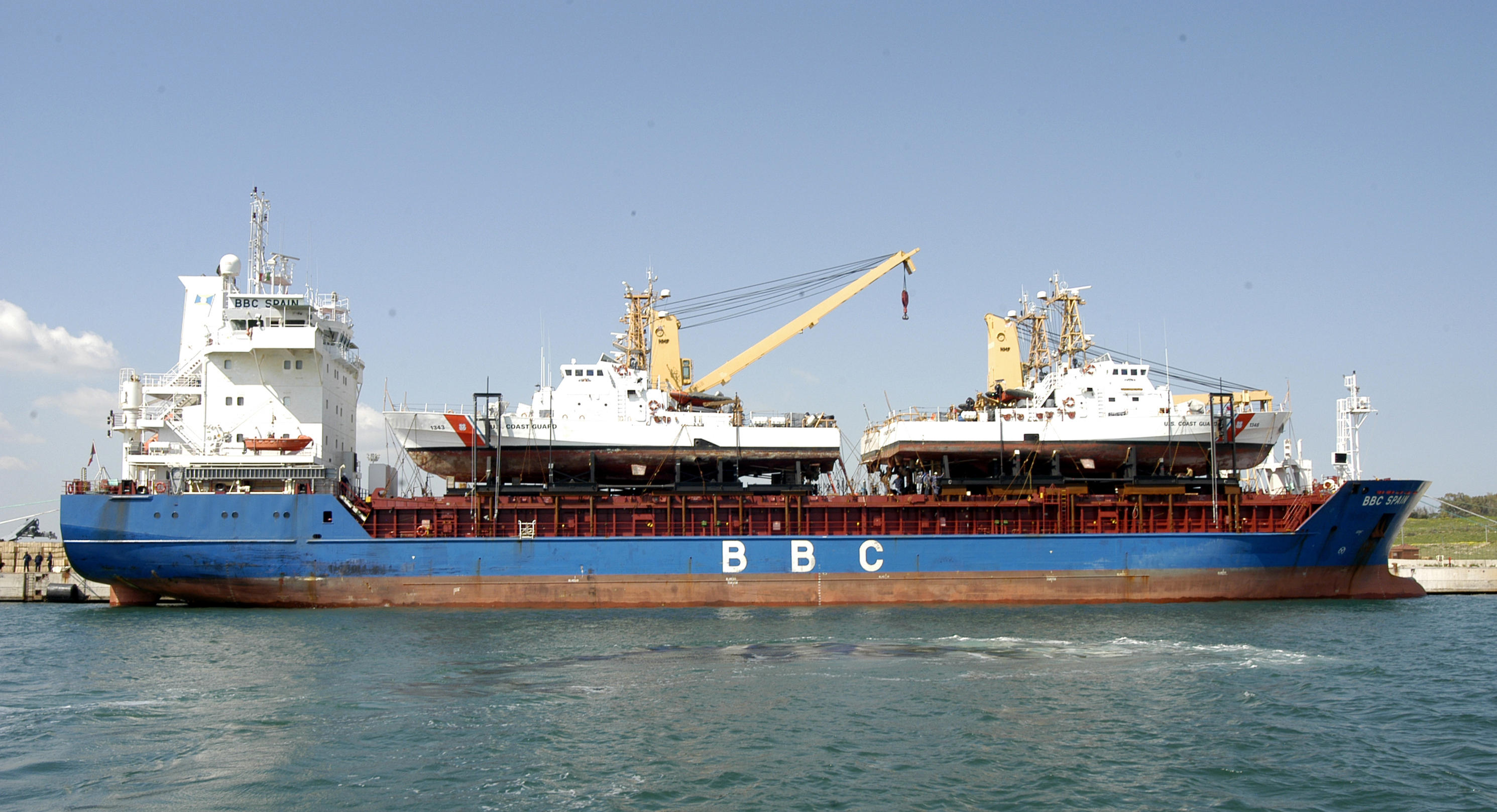
Island-class boats embarked for shipment to the Mediterranean in 2003

Plans for Operation Iraqi Freedom included eight Island-class patrol boats. Adak, Aquidneck, Baranof, and Wrangell were transferred to the Persian Gulf as deck cargo on M/V Industrial Challenger, a chartered freighter. Based in Manama, Bahrain, these became core elements of Patrol Forces Southwest Asia. During combat operations in March 2003, their missions included supporting the capture of Iraqi oil production platforms, patrolling against Iraqi small craft, capturing mine layers, rescue operations for helicopter crashes, and escorting cargo ships, particularly in the shallow, coastal waters where larger naval vessel could not operate. This was the first combat deployment of Coast Guard ships since the Vietnam war. After initial combat operations were concluded, the Island-class patrol boats engaged in mine clearance efforts and delivering humanitarian relief.

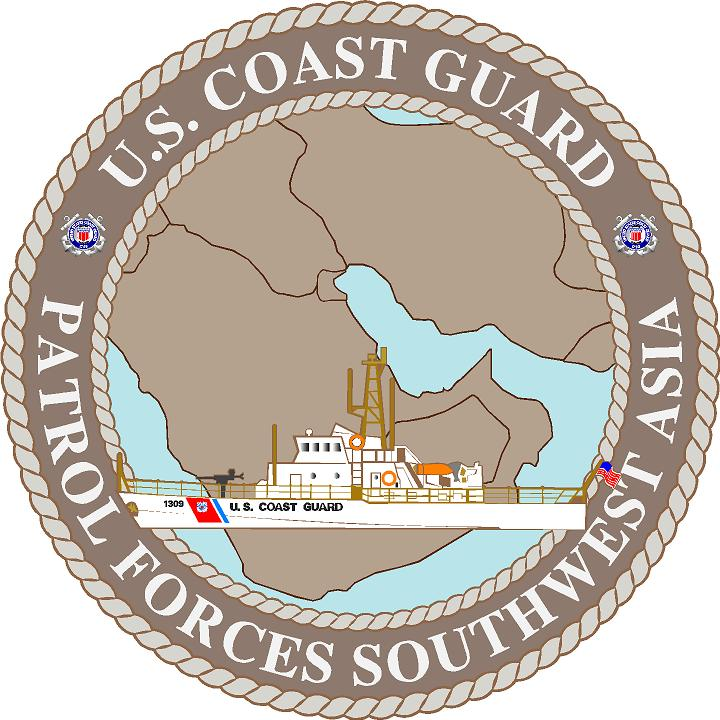
Six Island-class boats were permanently assigned to Bahrain as part of PATFORSWA

Bainbridge Island, Grand Island, Knight Island and Pea Island sailed as deck cargo aboard M/V BBC Spain. They were based at Augusta Bay, Sicily where they became the core elements of Patrol Forces Mediterranean. Their missions included escorting Military Sealift Command ships on their way to Turkey, and patrolling against the possibility of Iraqi leaders escaping into the Mediterranean via a land route through Syria. Both those missions were cancelled. Turkey refused to host Coalition forces to provide a northern invasion route, and Syria closed its border with Iraq. The 6th Fleet released the cutters in May 2003 and the four ships sailed back to the United States, setting a record for the longest transit by Island-class boats.

Maui and Monomony joined the initial four boats in Bahrain in 2004. The six Island-class boats of Patrol Forces Southwest Asia conducted river patrols, provided security to oil installations, enforced United Nations sanctions, and boarded vessels in the Persian Gulf searching for contraband, weaponry, and suspected terrorists. The Island-class boats were decommissioned in 2021 and 2022 and replaced by six Sentinel-class cutters, USCGC Charles Moulthrope , Robert Goldman, Glen Harris, Emlen Tunnell, John Scheuerman, and Clarence Sutphin Jr.

Island-class cutters were deployed to Haiti during Operation Uphold Democracy in 1993 and 1994.

== Dispositions ==
=== Transfers to foreign operators ===
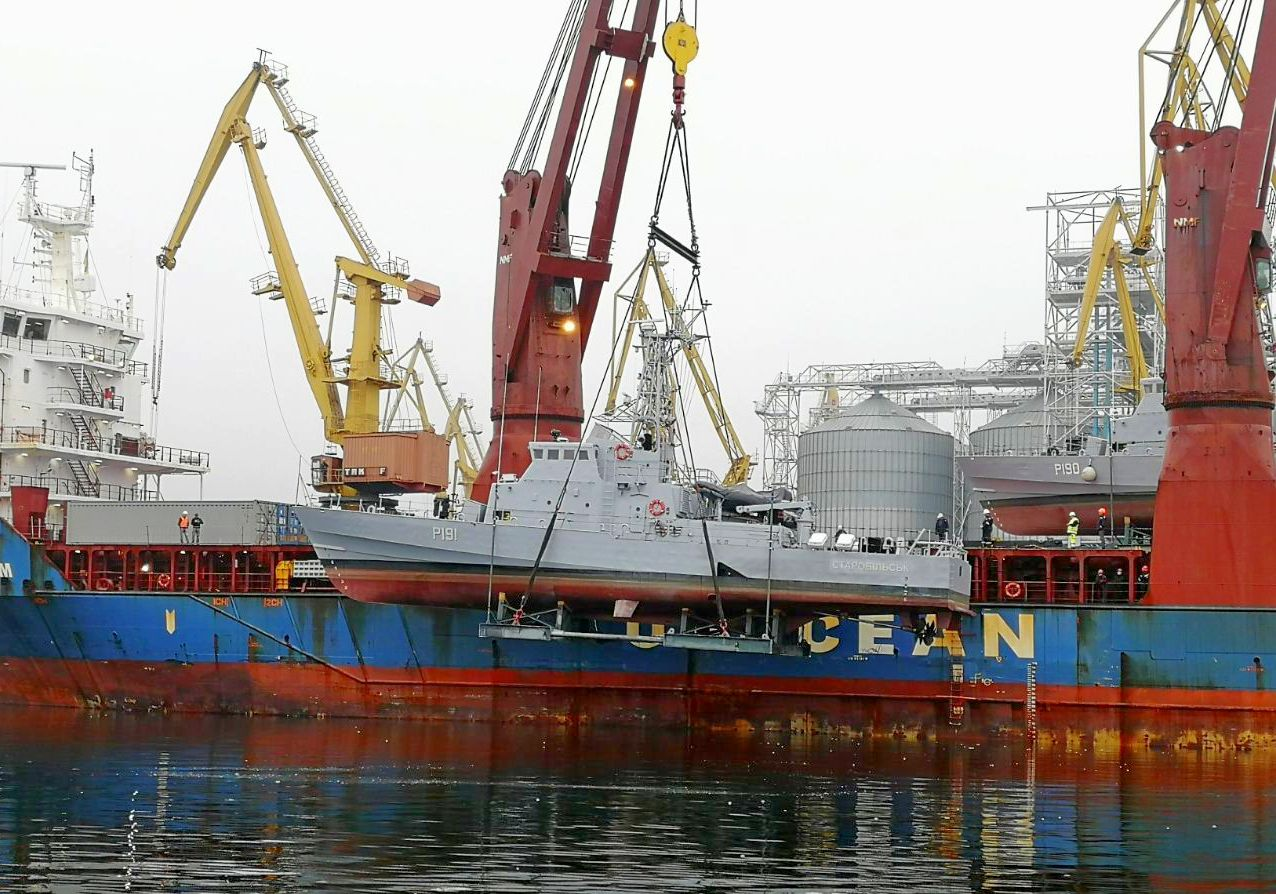
Unloading Starobilsk of the Ukrainian Navy, ex-USCGC Drummond

Under the Foreign Assistance Act of 1961, surplus military equipment could be transferred to other countries through the Excess Defense Articles program to support U.S. foreign policy objectives. The U.S. Coast Guard has transferred several ships to foreign navies and coast guards through this program via the Defense Security Cooperation Agency's Office of International Acquisitions. Not only do these transfers support American policy goals, but they also offset the $400,000 cost of scrapping the boats.

In December 2016 ex-Grand Isle and Key Biscayne were transferred to the Pakistan Maritime Security Agency.

In 2017 ex-Long Island and Roanoke Island were transferred to the Costa Rican Coast Guard as part of the anti-drug smuggling cooperation between the two nations. They were valued at $18.9 million. They underwent an extensive refit at the Coast Guard Yard before sailing to Costa Rica in 2018.

The Georgian Coast Guard was given the decommissioned Staten Island and Jefferson Island in 2018. The gift was intended to replace ships sunk by Russia in 2008 and to strengthen Georgia in the Black Sea.

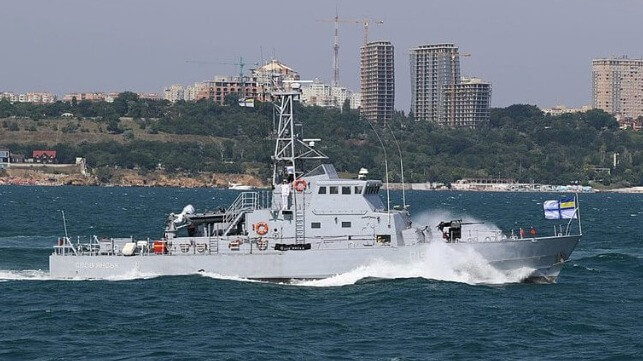
Sloviansk, ex-Cushing was sunk by Russian aircraft in 2022

On 21 January 2020 the United States embassy in Cameroon announced that the Cameroonian Navy intended to acquire two refurbished Island-class vessels. The $40.5 million deal was approved in order to reduce piracy in the Gulf of Guinea. In 2021, the United States imposed sanctions on Cameroon for human rights violations, and the transfer of the ships was cancelled.

The Hellenic Navy purchased, at a cost of €39 million, four of the Island-class boats which were decommissioned in Bahrain. These were ex-Adak, Aquidneck, Monomoy, and Wrangell. After an extensive shipyard refit, they were renamed and commissioned at a ceremony on 20 January 2025.

The Ukrainian Navy acquired five Island-class boats as part of a multi-billion dollar military assistance program begun in response to Russia's 2014 annexation of Crimea. In 2019 ex-Drummond and Cushing were commissioned in their new service. In 2021, ex-Ocracoke, and Washington arrived in Odessa. On 3 March 2022, Sloviansk, ex-Cushing, was sunk by Russian aircraft in the Black Sea. The fifth boat transferred to Ukraine was the ex-Kiska.

Under the United States-Ecuador Partnership Act of 2022, the President was ordered to assess whether the government of Ecuador could maintain Island-class cutters. If he concluded that it could, the President was authorized to transfer up to two Island-class cutters to Ecuador in order to protect the Galapagos Marine Reserve, to police illegal fishing, and to interdict drug smuggling.

In May 2023, the United States government pledged to provide the Philippines at least two Island-class patrol boats as part of a larger military assistance program during President Bongbong Marcos' visit to Washington D.C. The recipient of the transferred vessels will be the Philippine Navy.

Two Island-class cutters were transferred to the Tunisian Navy in order to increase regional stability. They were commissioned into their new service on 17 April 2025, at a ceremony attended by the Tunisian Minister of National Defense, Imed Memmich, United States Ambassador to Tunisia, Joey R. Hood, and the commander of the United States 6th Fleet, Vice Admiral Jeffrey T. Anderson. The ships were named Tazarka (P305) and Menzel Bourguiba (P306).

In May 2025 the Coast Guard reported that the last three Island-class boats decommissioned from American service, ex-Liberty, Mustang, and Naushon, were to be transferred to the Colombian National Navy under the Excess Defense Articles program. On 19 June 2025, the three Island-class boats were incorporated at Naval Base ARC Bolívar near Cartagena and were renamed ARC Batalla Toma de Sabanilla, ARC Batalla de Cispatá, and ARC Batalla Noche de San Juan.

=== Sales to Sea Shepherd ===
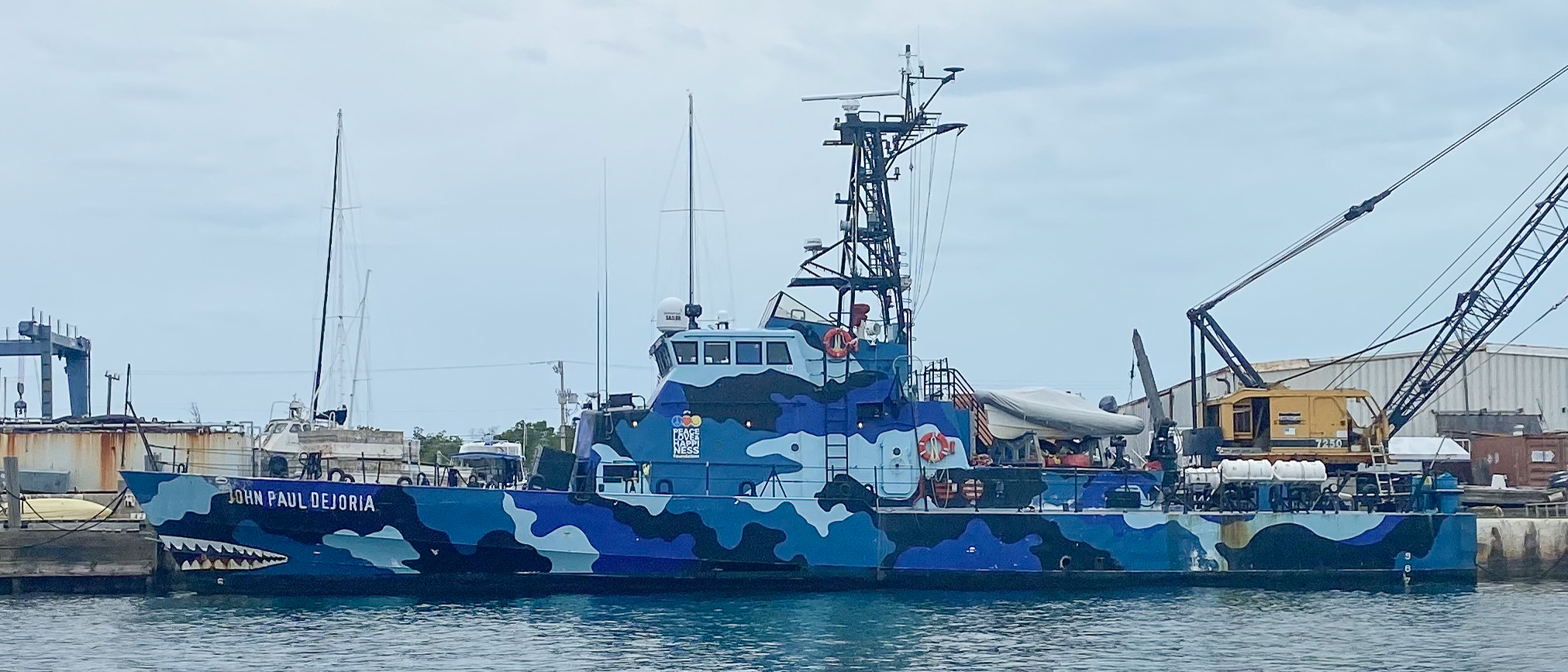
M/V John Paul DeJoria, ex-Block Island in 2020

The Sea Shepherd Conservation Society purchased ex-Block Island and Pea Island in June 2015, and ex-Bainbridge Island in November 2017. Sea Shepherd used these ships in a variety of campaigns to protect oceanic wildlife. All three of these ships were deployed to the Sea of Cortez in cooperation with the Mexican government to enforce fishing regulations which protected the endangered vaquita. All of them appear to have been scrapped as various maintenance issues proved to be uneconomical to repair.

== Boats in class ==
image	name	commissioned	decommissioned	notes
	Farallon (WPB-1301)	21 February 1986	2016	
	Manitou (WPB-1302)	24 January 1986	December 2006	Failed 110/123 conversion; scrapped
	Matagorda (WPB-1303)	24 April 1986	December 2006	Failed 110/123 conversion; scrapped
	Maui (WPB-1304)	9 May 1986	22 March 2022 in Manama, Bahrain	
	Monhegan (WPB-1305)	16 June 1986	December 2006	Failed 110/123 conversion; scrapped
	Nunivak (WPB-1306)	2 May 1986	December 2006	Failed 110/123 conversion; scrapped
	Ocracoke (WPB-1307)	4 August 1986	November 22, 2019	transferred to Ukraine, renamed Sumy
	Vashon (WPB-1308)	15 August 1986	December 2006	Failed 110/123 conversion; scrapped
	Aquidneck (WPB-1309)	26 September 1986	15 June 2021 in Manama, Bahrain	Transferred to Greece, renamed HS Gialopsos (P289)
	Mustang (WPB-1310)	29 August 1986	16 April 2025 in Seward, Alaska	Transferred to the Colombian National Navy
	Naushon (WPB-1311)	3 October 1986	21 March 2025 in Homer, Alaska	Transferred to the Colombian National Navy
	Sanibel (WPB-1312)	14 November 1986	2023	
	Edisto (WPB-1313)	7 January 1987	13 April 2018	
	Sapelo (WPB-1314)	24 February 1987	1 October 2016	
	Mantinicus (WPB-1315)	16 April 1987	31 March 2016	Scrapped in 2017
	Nantucket (WPB-1316)	4 June 1987	8 March 2017	
	Attu (WPB-1317)	9 May 1988	December 2006	Failed 110/123 conversion; scrapped
	Baranof (WPB-1318)	20 May 1988	26 September 2022	
	Chandeleur (WPB-1319)	8 June 1988	28 April 2022	
	Chincoteague (WPB-1320)	8 August 1988		
	Cushing (WPB-1321)	8 August 1988	8 March 2017	transferred to Ukraine, renamed Sloviansk, sunk by Russian aircraft on 3 March 2022
	Cuttyhunk (WPB-1322)	15 October 1988	5 May 2022 in Port Angeles, Washington	
	Drummond (WPB-1323)	19 October 1988		transferred to Ukraine, renamed Starobilsk
	Key Largo (WPB-1324)	24 December 1988	27 February 2023	
	Metompkin (WPB-1325)	12 January 1989	December 2006	Failed 110/123 conversion; scrapped
	Monomoy (WPB-1326)	16 December 1988	22 March 2022 in Manama, Bahrain	Transferred to Greece, renamed HS Liaskos (P199)
	Orcas (WPB-1327)	14 April 1989	23 April 2024 in Coos Bay, Oregon	
	Padre (WPB-1328)	24 February 1989	December 2006	Failed 110/123 conversion; scrapped
	Sitkanak (WPB-1329)	31 March 1989		
	Tybee (WPB-1330)	9 May 1989	28 March 2023	
	Washington (WPB-1331)	9 June 1989	18 December 2019	transferred to Ukraine, renamed P193 Fastiv
	Wrangell (WPB-1332)	24 June 1989	22 March 2022 in Manama, Bahrain	Transferred to Greece, renamed HS Mantouvalos (P197)
	Adak (WPB-1333)	17 November 1989	15 June 2021 in Manama, Bahrain	Transferred to Greece, renamed HS Galanis (P198)
	Liberty (WPB-1334)	4 August 1989	29 April 2025 in Valdez, Alaska	Transferred to the Colombian National Navy
	Anacapa (WPB-1335)	13 January 1990	26 April 2024 in Port Angeles, Washington	
	Kiska (WPB-1336)	ca. 1 December 1989 (delivery date)	23 October 2020	transferred to Ukraine, renamed Vyacheslav Kubrak
	Assateague (WPB-1337)	ca. 1 January 1990 (delivery date)	13 October 2017	Scrapped in 2017
	Grand Isle (WPB-1338)	ca. 14 December 1990 (delivery date)	2015	transferred to Pakistan, renamed PMSS Sabqat
	Key Biscayne (WPB-1339)	27 April 1991		transferred to Pakistan, renamed PMSS Rafaqat
	Jefferson Island (WPB-1340)	16 August 1991	19 September 2014 in Portland, Maine	transferred to Georgia, renamed Dioskuria
	Kodiak Island (WPB-1341)	21 June 1991		
	Long Island (WPB-1342)	27 August 1991		transferred to Costa Rica, renamed Juan Rafael Mora Porras
	Bainbridge Island (WPB-1343)	ca. 14 June 1991 (delivery date)	17 March 2014	purchased by Sea Shepherd, renamed MV Sharpie; likely scrapped
	Block Island (WPB-1344)	ca. 19 July 1991 (delivery date)	14 March 2014	purchased by Sea Shepherd, renamed MY Jules Verne & later MV John Paul DeJoria; likely scrapped
	Staten Island (WPB-1345)	22 November 1991	2 October 2014	transferred to Georgia, renamed Ochamchire
	Roanoke Island (WPB-1346)	8 February 1992	6 April 2015	transferred to Costa Rica, renamed Gen. Jose M. Canas Escamilla
	Pea Island (WPB-1347)	ca. 1 November 1992 (delivery date)		purchased by Sea Shepherd, renamed MY Farley Mowat II; likely scrapped
	Knight Island (WPB-1348)	ca. 6 December 1991 (delivery date)		
	Galveston Island (WPB-1349)	ca. 17 January 1992 (delivery date)	16 March 2018	Scrapped in 2018
