= PMSS Sabqat =

Former United States Coast Guard boat

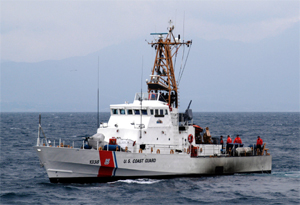
- USCGC Grand Isle (WPB-1338) off Crete in 2003

History

United States
- Name: Grand Isle
- Namesake: Grand Isle, Louisiana
- Builder: Bollinger Shipyards
- Commissioned: 1991
- Decommissioned: 2015
- Identification: Hull number: WPB-1338; MMSI number: 367938000; Callsign: NABD

Pakistan
- Name: Sabqat
- Owner: Pakistan Maritime Security Agency
- Acquired: 2016
- Identification: 1066

General characteristics
- Class & type: C-series Island-class patrol boat
- Displacement: 153 long tons (155 t)
- Length: 110 ft (34 m)
- Beam: 21 ft (6.4 m)
- Draft: 6.5 ft (2.0 m)
- Propulsion: 2 × 16-cylinder Caterpillar 3516 diesel engines
- Speed: 29.5 knots (54.6 km/h; 33.9 mph)
- Range: 3,300 nmi (6,100 km; 3,800 mi)
- Endurance: 5 days
- Boats & landing craft carried: 1 × Cutter Boat Medium (90 HP outboard engine)
- Complement: 16 (2 officers, 14 enlisted)
- Sensors & processing systems: AN/SPS-64V radar
- Armament: 1 × Mk 38 25 mm chain gun; 2 × M2HB .50 caliber machine guns; 2 × M60 7.62 mm machine guns

USCGC Grand Isle (WPB-1338) was an Island-class patrol boat operated by the United States Coast Guard. She was based in Gloucester, Massachusetts and named after Grand Isle, Louisiana. In 2016, the ship was transferred to Pakistan and renamed Sabqat.

== Design ==
The Island-class patrol boats were constructed in Bollinger Shipyards, Lockport, Louisiana. Grand Isle has an overall length of 110 feet (34 m). It had a beam of 21 feet (6.4 m) and a draft of 7 feet (2.1 m) at the time of construction. The patrol boat has a displacement of 154 tonnes (152 long tons; 170 short tons) at full load and 137 tonnes (135 long tons; 151 short tons) at half load. It is powered by two Paxman Valenta 16 CM diesel engines or two Caterpillar 3516 diesel engines. It has two 99 kilowatts (135 PS; 133 shp) 3304T diesel generators made by Caterpillar; these can serve as motor–generators. Its hull is constructed from highly strong steel, and the superstructure and major deck are constructed from aluminum.

The Island-class patrol boats have maximum sustained speeds of 29.5 knots (54.6 km/h; 33.9 mph). It is fitted with one 25 millimetres (0.98 in) machine gun and two 7.62 millimetres (0.300 in) M60 light machine guns; it may also be fitted with two Browning .50 caliber machine guns. It is fitted with satellite navigation systems, collision avoidance systems, surface radar, and a Loran C system. It has a range of 3,330 miles (2,890 nmi; 5,360 km) and an endurance of five days. Its complement is sixteen (two officers and fourteen crew members). Island-class patrol boats are based on Vosper Thornycroft 33 metres (108 ft) patrol boats and have similar dimensions.

== Construction and career ==
In January 2012, Grand Isle returned to Gloucester after repairs that took six months. When she entered the Baltimore dockyard in the summer of 2011, she was estimated to require $1.6 million in repairs, repairs that would take eight weeks. However, more extensive repairs were required, which took longer and cost $2.7 million.

As of December 2016, the United States Government transferred Grand Isle from the United States Coast Guard to the Pakistan Navy's Maritime Security Agency under the Office of International Acquisition’s Excess Defense Articles (EDA) Program, together with sister ship Key Biscayne. Grand Isle was renamed Sabqat and assigned number 1066.
