= USCGC Knight Island =

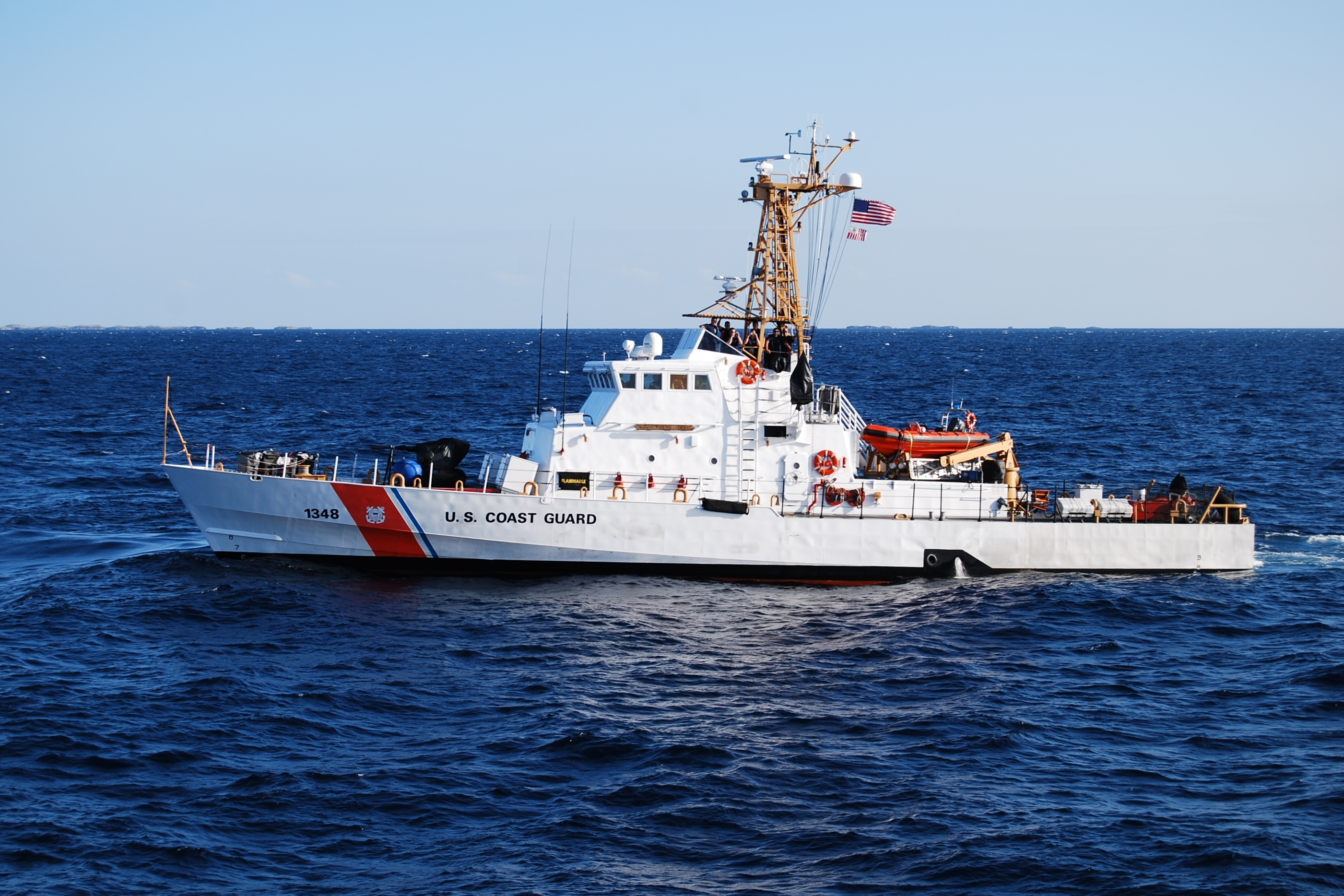
- USCGC Knight Island (WPB-1348)

History

United States
- Namesake: Knight Island, Alaska
- Builder: Bolinger Shipyard, Lockport, Louisiana
- Commissioned: April 22, 1992
- Home port: Key West, FL
- Identification: MMSI number: 367905000; Callsign: NMFN
- Status: in active service

General characteristics
- Displacement: 168 tons
- Length: 110 ft (34 m)
- Beam: 21 ft (6.4 m)
- Draft: 6.5 ft (2.0 m)
- Propulsion: Twin Turbo Charged Diesel Caterpillar
- Speed: 30+ knots
- Range: 9,900 miles
- Endurance: 6 days
- Boats & landing craft carried: 1 - Cutter Boat Medium (90 HP outboard engine)
- Complement: 18 personnel (2 officers, 16 enlisted)
- Armament: Mark 38 25 mm machine gun system; 2 × .50 caliber Machine Gun; Various Small Arms

USCGC Knight Island (WPB-1348) receives her namesake from Knight Island in the Prince William Sound of Alaska. She was commissioned on April 22, 1992, at Bollinger Shipyards in Lockport, Louisiana. Knight Island and the other 48 Island class cutters' construction were based on the internationally known Vosper-Thornycroft design. Her hull is a semi-displacement type monohull made of high strength steel, while the main deck and superstructure are aluminum. Knight Island employs an active fin stabilization system to improve her sea keeping abilities. With a top speed in excess of 30 knots and a cruising speed of 26 knots, the ship is capable of enduring unsupported operations for six days, and she accommodates two officers and sixteen enlisted personnel.

== Island Class Patrol Boat Overview ==
The 110-foot Island-class Patrol Boats are a U.S. Coast Guard modification of a highly successful British-designed patrol boat. With excellent range and seakeeping capabilities, the Island class, all named after U.S. islands, replaced the older 95-foot Cape-class patrol boats. These cutters are equipped with advanced electronics and navigation equipment and are used on the front lines of the Coast Guard's maritime homeland security, migrant interdiction, fisheries enforcement, and search-and-rescue missions.

The 58 ordered 154-foot Sentinel-class cutters, selected under the Fast Response Cutter (FRC) program, are slated to replace the 37 aging cutters remaining in the Island class.

== History ==
Originally homeported in Freeport, Texas, Knight Island’s home port was changed to St. Petersburg, Florida in the summer of 2000. In 2008, Knight Island’s homeport was changed again to Key West, Florida. Knight Island’s current complement is of two separate crews, known as the Port and Starboard Crew in support of the Coast Guard's new effort to maximize the operational hours of the patrol boats in the Coast Guard's Seventh District by utilizing a dual-crew manning concept.

Typical patrols in Key West, Florida’s area of operations involve search and rescue, alien migrant interdiction operations, fisheries law enforcement, counter narcotics operations, and homeland security.

== Current ==
Knight Island's main patrol area is the Florida Straits. She often interdicts illegal migrants from go-fast vessels and homebuilt rustica rafts from Cuba. In the past two years, Knight Island has cared for over 1000 illegal migrants on her decks and conducted numerous politically sensitive repatriations to Cabanas, Cuba.

In January 2010, Knight Island traveled to Bayou La Batre, Alabama for an extensive $750,000 Dry-Dock Package. During the yard period, major projects will be completed by local yard employees from Master Marine Inc. and the ship's crew. Some of the major projects include: hull and bilge preservation and painting, main engine and generator replacements, numerous tank inspections, cleanings, and preservations, and painting of interior and exterior surfaces. This dry-dock will help ensure the Knight Island will continue to be a viable asset for the U.S. Coast Guard.

In February 2012, the United States Naval Institute reported that the Knight Island had been presented the Seventh District Coast Guard Foundation Award for a particularly volatile case east of Riviera, Florida, in which its crew members adapted from law enforcement prosecution to search and rescue.
