= USCGC Mustang =

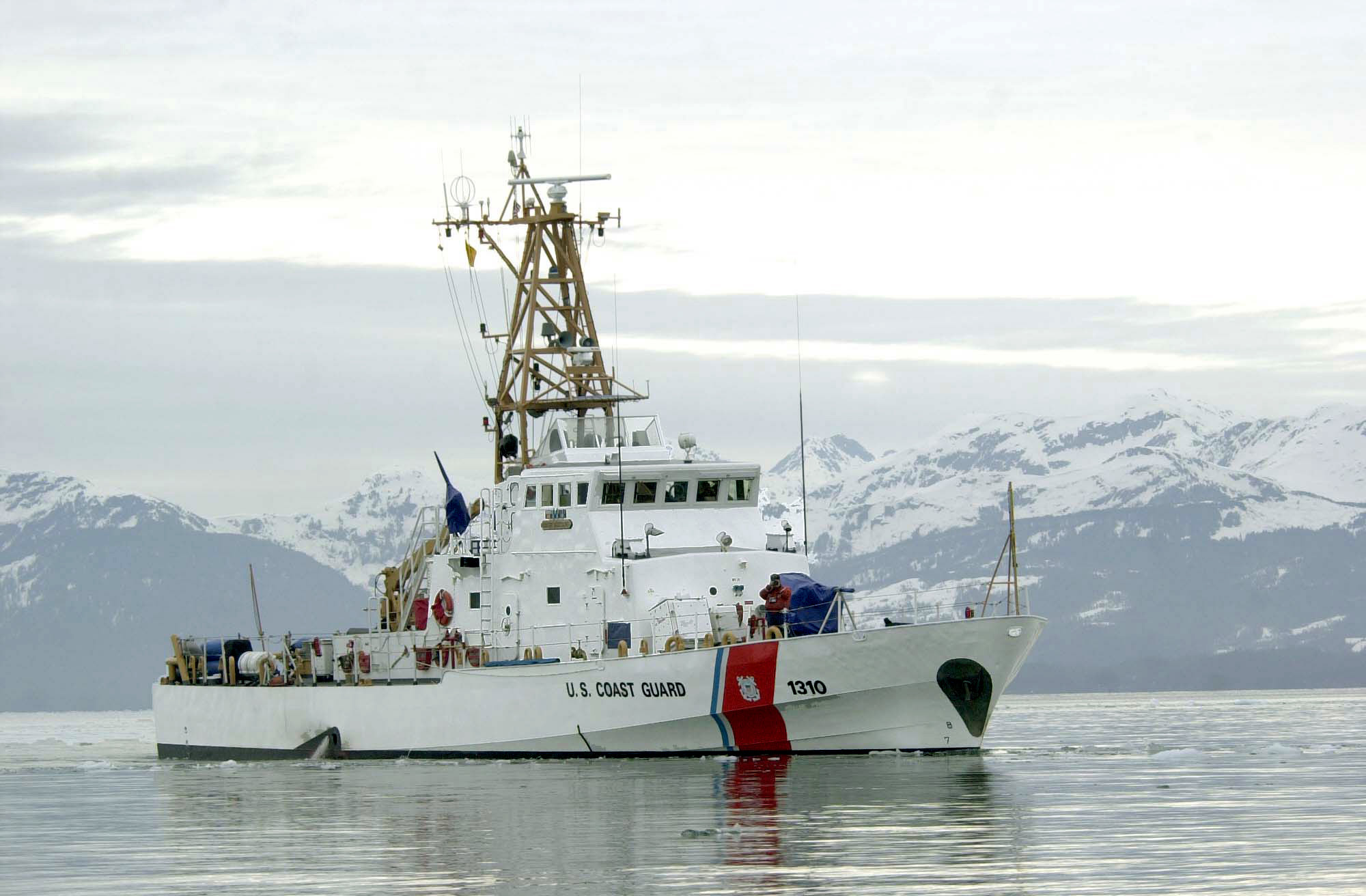

History

United States
- Builder: Bollinger Machine Shop and Shipyard, Inc.
- Commissioned: 29 August 1986
- Decommissioned: 16 April 2025
- Home port: Seward, Alaska
- Identification: MMSI number: 367951000; Callsign: NJSH
- Status: Decommissioned

General characteristics
- Class & type: Island-class cutter
- Displacement: 154 tons full load
- Length: 110 ft 0 in (33.53 m)
- Beam: 21 ft 0 in (6.40 m)
- Propulsion: Twin Paxman Valenta 16-CM RP-200M
- Speed: 29.5 knots (54.6 km/h; 33.9 mph)
- Range: 1,900 nautical miles (3,500 km; 2,200 mi)
- Complement: 2 officers, 16 enlisted,
- Armament: One MK 38/25 mm machine gun, two .50-caliber machine guns

The USCGC Mustang (WPB-1310) was an Island-class cutter of the United States Coast Guard, the tenth ship of her class. She was commissioned on 29 August 1986 and decommissioned on 16 April 2025. Her primary objective was maritime safety, though she was a multiple-role ship.

Mustang was named after Mustang Island, a barrier island on the Gulf Coast of Texas.

== Design ==
The Island-class patrol boats were constructed in Bollinger Shipyards, Lockport, Louisiana. Mustang had an overall length of 110 feet (34 m). She had a beam of 21 feet (6.4 m) and a draft of 7.3 feet (2.2 m) in 2020. At that time, the patrol boat displaced 165 tonnes (162 long tons; 182 short tons) at full load. She was powered by two Paxman Valenta 16 CM diesel engines developing a total of 5,760 hp (4,295 kW) at 1500 RPM. She had two 99 kilowatts (135 PS; 133 shp) 3304T diesel generators made by Caterpillar; these could serve as motor–generators. Her hull was constructed from highly strong steel, and the superstructure and major deck constructed from aluminium.

The Island-class patrol boats have maximum sustained speeds of 29.5 knots (54.6 km/h; 33.9 mph). She was armed with one 25 millimetres (0.98 in) cannon and two 7.62 millimetres (0.300 in) M60 light machine guns; she could also be fitted with two Browning .50 Caliber Machine Guns. She was equipped with satellite navigation systems, collision avoidance systems, surface radar, and a Loran C system. She had a range of 3,330 miles (2,890 nmi; 5,360 km) and an endurance of five days. Her complement was sixteen (two officers and fourteen crew members). Island-class patrol boats are based on Vosper Thornycroft 33 metres (108 ft) patrol boats and have similar dimensions.

== History ==
Mustang was stationed in Seward, Alaska, in the north of the Gulf of Alaska, for the duration of her commission. After her decommissioning, she sailed from Ketchikan, Alaska on 14 May 2025 in company with two other decommissioned Island-class patrol boats, Liberty and Naushon. At that time, Mustang and her two sister ships were earmarked to be transferred to the Columbian Navy via the Excess Defense Articles program. As many as seven Island-class patrol boats were stationed in Alaska at once while the class was in service.
