= USCGC Galveston Island =

Island-class patrol boat of the US Coast Guard

History

United States
- Name: USCGC Galveston Island
- Namesake: Galveston Island, Texas
- Operator: U.S. Coast Guard
- Builder: Bollinger Shipyards, Lockport, Louisiana
- Laid down: 1 July 1988
- Commissioned: 5 June 1992
- Decommissioned: 16 March 2018
- Home port: Honolulu, Hawaii
- Identification: MMSI number: 367901000; Callsign: NRLP
- Nickname(s): G.I.
- Status: Decommissioned

General characteristics
- Class & type: Island-class cutter
- Displacement: 164 tons
- Length: 110 ft (34 m)
- Beam: 21 ft (6.4 m)
- Draft: 6.5 ft (2.0 m)
- Propulsion: Twin Paxman Valenta 16-CM RP-200M
- Speed: 30+ knots
- Range: 9,900 miles
- Endurance: 6 days
- Boats & landing craft carried: 1 – RHI (90 HP outboard engine)
- Complement: 22 personnel (3 officers, 19 enlisted)
- Armament: 25 mm Mk 38 machine gun; 5 × .50 caliber machine guns; 1 × MK 19 40MM Grenade Launcher Various Small Arms
- Notes: Communications: VHF and HF

USCGC Galveston Island (WPB 1349) was an Island-class patrol boat used by the United States Coast Guard for law enforcement and search and rescue duties. She was commissioned on 5 June 1992 and was the last of the Island-class patrol boats built. Her original homeport was Apra Harbor, Guam but later changed to Honolulu, Hawaii, where she was decommissioned.

The 110-foot Island-class patrol boat was a Coast Guard modification of the British shipbuilder, Vosper Thornycroft patrol boat design. With range and seakeeping capabilities, the Island class, all named after U.S. islands, replaced the older 95-foot Cape-class cutters. These cutters are equipped with advanced electronics and navigation equipment.

== Design ==
The Island-class patrol boats were constructed in Bollinger Shipyards, Lockport, Louisiana. Galveston Island has an overall length of 110 feet (34 m). It had a beam of 21 feet (6.4 m) and a draft of 7 feet (2.1 m) at the time of construction. The patrol boat has a displacement of 154 tonnes (152 long tons; 170 short tons) at full load and 137 tonnes (135 long tons; 151 short tons) at half load. It is powered two Paxman Valenta 16 CM diesel engines or two Caterpillar 3516 diesel engines. It has two 99 kilowatts (135 PS; 133 shp) 3304T diesel generators made by Caterpillar; these can serve as motor–generators. Its hull is constructed from highly strong steel, and the superstructure and major deck are constructed from aluminium.

The Island-class patrol boats have maximum sustained speeds of 29.5 knots (54.6 km/h; 33.9 mph). They are fitted with one 25 millimetres (0.98 in) machine gun and two 7.62 millimetres (0.300 in) M60 light machine guns; they may also be fitted with two Browning .50 Caliber Machine Guns. It is fitted with satellite navigation systems, collision avoidance systems, surface radar, and a Loran C system. It has a range of 3,330 miles (2,890 nmi; 5,360 km) and an endurance of five days. Its complement is sixteen (two officers and fourteen crew members). Island-class patrol boats are based on Vosper Thornycroft 33 metres (108 ft) patrol boats and have similar dimensions.

== History ==
Galveston Island was decommissioned in Honolulu on 16 March 2018, and it was initially anticipated that she would be transferred to a foreign government via the Foreign Assistance Act, as happened with other Island-class ships. Instead, approval was found for ship breaking it in Honolulu Harbor.

== Notes ==
=== References cited ===
- "110-foot Patrol Boat (WPB) – Island Class". Aircraft, Boats, and Cutters. U.S. Coast Guard. Archived from the original on 30 April 2017.
- "USCG 110' "Island Class" Patrol Boats (WPB)". Bollinger Shipyards. Archived from the original on 19 November 2017.
- "USCGC GALVESTON ISLAND (WPB 1349)" (PDF). U.S. Coast Guard. Archived from the original (PDF) on 25 February 2017.
- Scheina, Robert L. (1990). U.S. Coast Guard Cutters & Craft, 1946-1990. Naval Institute Press, Annapolis. ISBN 978-0-87021-719-7.
