= USCGC Matagorda (WPB-1303) =

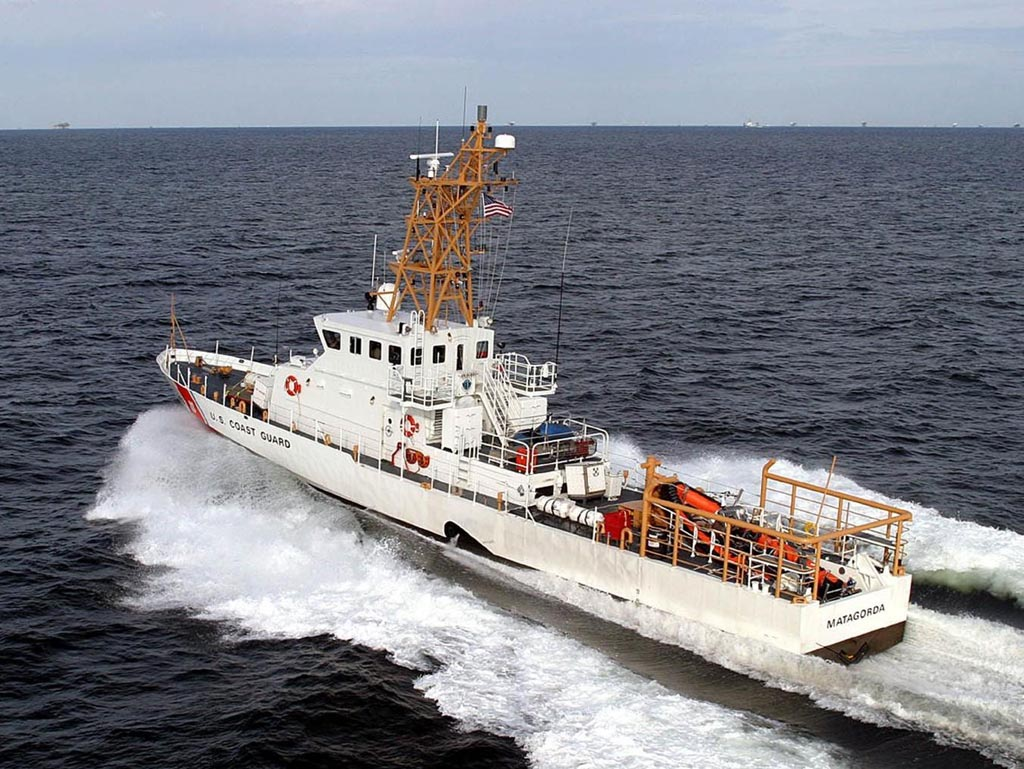
- USCGC Matagorda (WPB-1303). Note the Short Range Prosecutor launch on the rear launching ramp.

History

United States
- Name: USCGC Matagorda (WPB-1303)
- Namesake: Matagorda Island in Texas
- Builder: Bollinger Machine Shop and Shipyard, Lockport, Louisiana
- Commissioned: 24 April 1986
- Decommissioned: 23 January 2003
- Status: Inactive
- Notes: Taken out of service ca. December 2006

General characteristics
- Class & type: Island-class patrol boat
- Displacement: 168 tons
- Length: 110 ft (34 m)
- Beam: 21 ft (6.4 m)
- Draught: 7.3 ft (2.2 m)
- Installed power: 5,596 horsepower (4.17 MW) sustained
- Propulsion: Two Paxman Engines 3516 DITA diesel engines, two shafts
- Speed: 29 knots (54 km/h; 33 mph)
- Range: 3,928 nautical miles (7,275 km; 4,520 mi) at 10 knots (19 km/h; 12 mph)
- Complement: 16 (2 officers, 14 enlisted personnel)
- Sensors & processing systems: Hughes/Furuno SPS-73 I-band (navigation)
- Armament: 1 × McDonnell Douglas 25-millimeter; 2 × .50-caliber (12.7-millimeter) machine guns; SCCS-Lite combat data system

USCGC Matagorda (WPB-1303) is an Island-class patrol boat of the United States Coast Guard. She was commissioned 24 April 1986. Matagorda was one of eight of the 110-foot cutters to be modified under the Integrated Deepwater System Program aka. "Deepwater" to 123-foot. She was taken out of service about December 2006 due to problems with the Deepwater conversion.

== Conversion ==
The United States Coast Guard Cutter Matagorda (WPB-1303) was part of the 110-foot Island-class patrol boat cutters. The vessel's design was based on highly accredited patrol boats from Great Britain, the Vosper Thornycroft 33 metres (108 ft) patrol boat. It replaced the older 95-foot Cape-class cutter with these U.S. island-named cutters. Matagorda was built by Bollinger Shipyard on April 24, 1986, in Lockport, Louisiana. In 2004, as part of a program called Deepwater, the Coast Guard wanted to extend the life of the 110 foot Island-class cutters, stationed in Key West, Florida. The eight cutters being modified were the USCGC Matagorda (WPB-1303), USCGC Attu (WPB-1317), USCGC Metompkin (WPB-1325), USCGC Padre (WPB-1328), USCGC Manitou (WPB-1302), USCGC Monhegan (WPB-1305), USCGC Nunivak (WPB-1306) and the USCGC Vashon (WPB-1308). They were scheduled to go through a refit, which included adding 13 feet to the stern to make a high-speed launching ramp for a smaller patrol boat. This renovation was to also replace the original superstructure to accommodate mixed-gender crews while also adding new electronics, berthing reconfigurations, galley upgrades, and communication equipment. With these new additions and extension, this vessel was transformed from an Island-class ship to a blue-water vessel.

== Sea trials ==
In September 2004, after all eight ships were introduced to the refurbishment plan and the first four had been delivered, sea trials were begun to determine how effective the 15-year life extension program was. During the sea trials, the lead ship Matagorda was forced to conduct a high speed transit to avoid Hurricane Ivan. At one point, she was running at approximately 24 knots (44 km/h; 28 mph) in Sea State Five conditions, which involve eight to twelve foot seas. Upon arrival at her home port in Key West, Florida, the crew discovered buckling of the side and main deck on the starboard side near midships. Once spotted, the Coast Guard ordered inspections on the remainder of the fleet. Similar cracking problems subsequently occurred on the next three vessels coming off the water. Upon further assessments on the remaining ships, cracks were found in all eight ships and were getting worse. These cracks got so severe, pinhole breaches were found in the hulls. The shipyard wasted no time trying to repair and strengthen the hulls, but the converted cutters continued to crack at high speed in rough seas. Efforts to repair the Matagorda and the other vessels in the fleet were unsuccessful. The cutters were reported unseaworthy and were taken out of service.

== Sea trial results ==
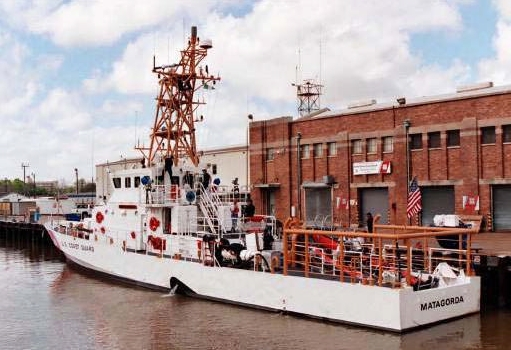
USCGC Matagorda (WPB-1303), the first 110-foot cutter to be converted to 123 feet, at Integrated Support Command New Orleans, Louisiana, on 27 March 2004. Matagorda made a brief stop in New Orleans on the way to her home port in Key West, Florida.

The refit added about 15 tons to the vessel's displacement, and reduced its maximum speed by approximately one knot. This added length and weight caused unexpected flexing on the ships' decks, causing cracks. At least one cutter had warping so severe; its engines were no longer fully seated, while another ship's fuel tanks were deformed to the point of leakage. Another problem these cutters faced after their intended improvement was their steering. The steering system was mangled so badly, they had problems maintaining course, even at speeds slower than ten knots. The propeller shaft design was flawed also, growing steadily misaligned with the engines once the cracking of the hulls began. The maritime waste disposal systems were also damaged to the point of being below specification. There was poor welding and sloppy workmanship throughout the ships that also attributed to the failing of these vessels' hulls. The communications system was a complete fiasco too, barely functional and completely unsecure. All of the work done by Bollinger for the Deepwater System Program was done insufficiently and all contributed to the failing of these ships.

== Legal liability ==
In January 2008, the United States Coast Guard made an unusual move of demanding a partial refund of $96.1 million, but the request was withdrawn later in the year due to possible criminal charges that could be faced, enforced by the Department of Justice. In addition to the Coast Guard, the Justice department also sued Bollinger Shipyards for damages towards Matagorda and seven other boats in that fleet. The Coast Guard paid hundreds of millions of dollars towards Bollinger for this refit, and has tried to file for reimbursement 65 times once the Matagorda had displayed the six inch crack in its hull. The suit was dismissed.

== Conclusion ==
In late 2005, sea state restrictions were given to the cutters requiring better workmanship and quality for construction in the future. At the same time, these refits were halted with only eight out of the intended 49 cutters actually being worked on. On November 30, 2006, Admiral Thad Allen, Coast Guard Commandant, personally gave a direct order to immediately decommission all eight converted ships. The crews were dispersed to other cutters in the United States Coast Guard Seventh District and the ships were towed to the Coast Guard Yard at Curtis Bay, Maryland, where they remain in a "mothballed" state as of February 2014, pending likely scrapping.

The 110-foot patrol boats proved to be an effective addition to the drug and immigration enforcement, search and rescue, and fishery law enforcement. The Island-class cutter design is approaching a period of time where the remaining 110 foot cutters are aging and will either not be maintained adequately or will not be replaced by something newer. A Coast Guard committee found this situation unacceptable and wanted immediate action to avoid any loss in the Coast Guard's operational readiness or national maritime security. The Coast Guard ended the Deepwater Conversion plan early enough to save upwards of $80,000,000 originally planned to be spent altering these vessels. While the Coast Guard has sped up the development associated with the Fast Response Cutter and Sentinel-class cutter, with the 123-foot conversion program idled, there are fewer small patrol craft due to the absence of the converted patrol boats being taken out of service. The fact that six 110-foot cutters are absent due to supporting the Global War on Terror is further complicating the ability of the Coast Guard to have adequate underway patrol coverage domestically. The six deployed cutters have no expected date of return from overseas duty.

The Coast Guard sued Bollinger, in 2003, and Bollinger paid a $8.5 million settlement in December 2015.
