= USCGC Assateague =

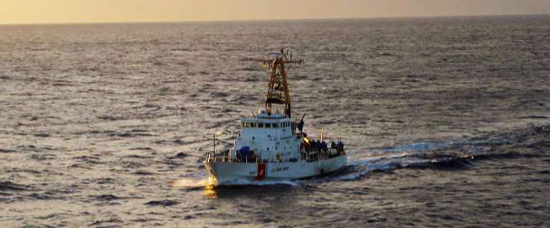

History

United States
- Name: USCGC Assateague (WPB-1337)
- Namesake: Assateague Island, Maryland & Virginia
- Builder: Bolinger Shipyard; Lockport, Louisiana
- Launched: 10 November 1989
- Commissioned: 15 June 1990
- Decommissioned: 13 October 2017
- Home port: Apra Harbor, Guam
- Fate: Berthed in Queensland, Australia, July 2018
- Status: Decommissioned

General characteristics
- Class & type: Island class patrol cutter (WPB)
- Displacement: 168 tons
- Length: 110 ft (34 m)
- Beam: 21 ft (6.4 m)
- Speed: 28 knots (52 km/h; 32 mph)
- Range: 2,000 miles
- Complement: 18 personnel (2 Officers, 16 Enlisted)
- Armament: 1 25mm manned auto-cannon, 2 50 Cal. Browning M2 machine guns, (minimum small arms armament: 2 12 gauge shot guns, 2 M16A1 rifles, 8 Sig P226R 40 Cal. Pistols)
- Armor: 3/8th inch steel hull
- Aircraft carried: None

USCGC Assateague (WPB-1337) was an Island-class cutter of the United States Coast Guard. Assateague was constructed at Bollinger Machine Shop and Shipyard in Lockport, Louisiana and commissioned on 15 June 1990.

== Service history ==
While operating in the Coast Guard 14th District, the cutter reported to Sector Guam. Assateague supported multi-mission operations throughout Sector Guam’s vast area of responsibility, which includes the U.S. Exclusive Economic Zones surrounding Guam and the Commonwealth of the Northern Mariana Islands and an international SAR area that includes the Republic of Palau and the Federated States of Micronesia, conducting search and rescue response missions, and ports, waterways & coastal security operations.

== Design ==
The Island-class patrol boats were constructed in Bollinger Shipyards, Lockport, Louisiana. Assateague had an overall length of 110 feet (34 m). It had a beam of 21 feet (6.4 m) and a draft of 7 feet (2.1 m) at the time of construction. The patrol boat had a displacement of 154 tonnes (152 long tons; 170 short tons) at full load and 137 tonnes (135 long tons; 151 short tons) at half load. It was powered two Paxman Valenta 16 CM diesel engines. It had two 99 kilowatts (135 PS; 133 shp) 3304B diesel generators made by Caterpillar; these served as motor–generators. Its hull was constructed from highly strong steel, and the superstructure and major deck were constructed from aluminium.

The Island-class patrol boats have maximum sustained speeds of 29.5 knots (54.6 km/h; 33.9 mph). It was fitted with one 25 millimetres (0.98 in) machine gun and two 7.62 millimetres (0.300 in) M60 light machine guns; it may also be fitted with two Browning .50 Caliber Machine Guns. It was fitted with satellite navigation systems, collision avoidance systems, surface radar, and a Loran C system. It had a range of 3,330 miles (2,890 nmi; 5,360 km) and an endurance of five days. Its complement was sixteen (two officers and fourteen crew members). Island-class patrol boats are based on Vosper Thornycroft 33 metres (108 ft) patrol boats and have similar dimensions. Coast Guard Cutter Assateague was decommissioned on 13 October 2017.
