= USCGC Maui =

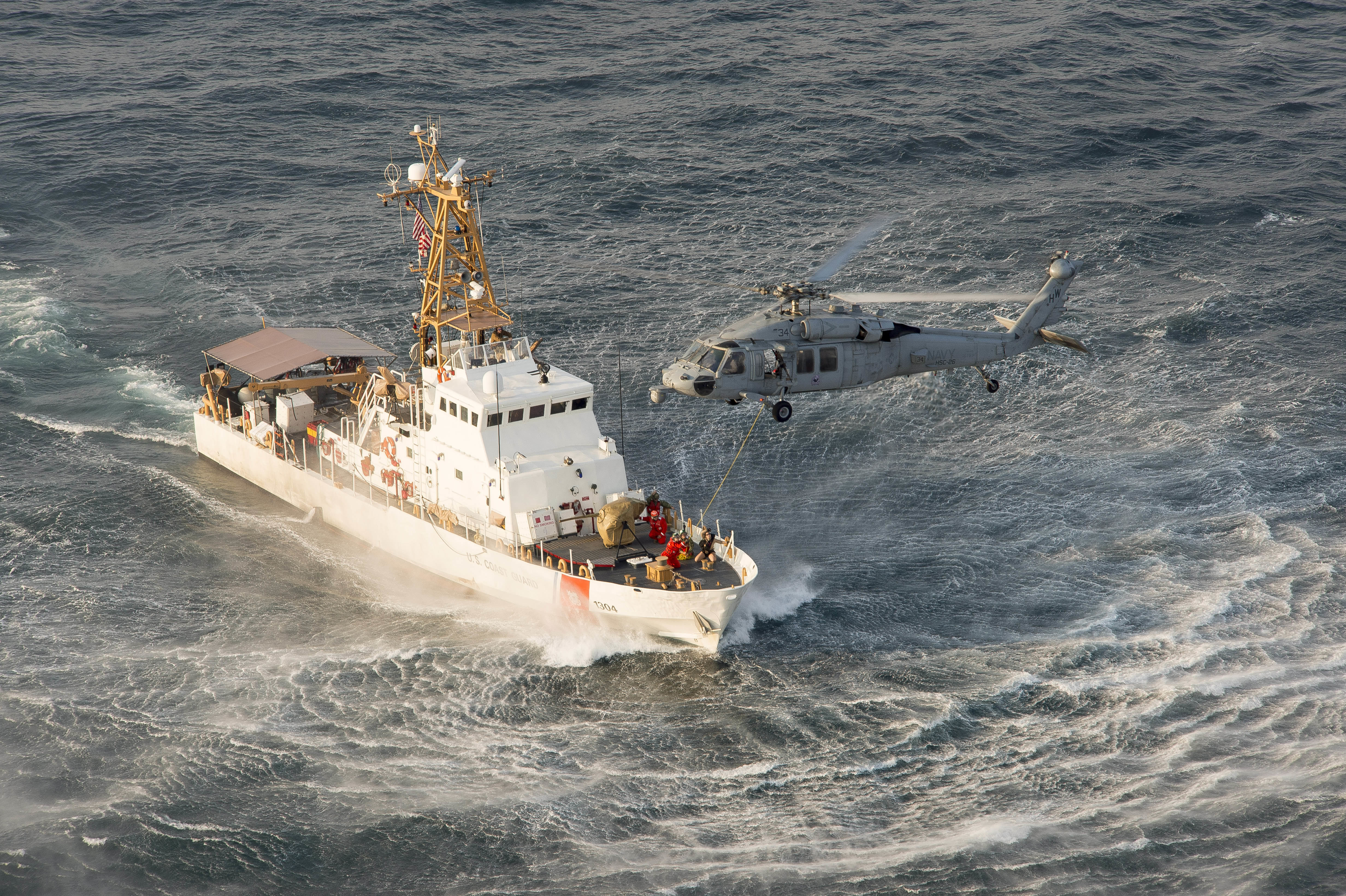
- USCGC Maui (WPB-1304) with MH-60S of HSC-26 off Bahrain in December 2014

History

United States
- Name: USCGC Maui
- Namesake: Maui, Hawaii
- Owner: USCG
- Builder: Bolinger Shipyard, Lockport, Louisiana
- Laid down: 8 April 1985
- Launched: 11 January 1986
- Commissioned: 9 May 1986
- Decommissioned: 22 March 2022
- Home port: Manama, Bahrain
- Status: Decommissioned
- Notes: WPB-1304

General characteristics
- Displacement: 168 tons
- Length: 110 ft (34 m)
- Beam: 21 ft (6.4 m)
- Draft: 6.5 ft (2.0 m)
- Propulsion: Twin Turbo Charged Diesel Paxman Valenta
- Speed: 30+ knots
- Range: 9,900 miles
- Endurance: 6 days
- Boats & landing craft carried: 1 - Cutter Boat Medium (90 HP outboard engine)
- Complement: 18 personnel (2 officers, 16 enlisted)
- Armament: Mark 38 25 mm machine gun system; 2 × .50 caliber Machine Gun; Various Small Arms

USCGC Maui (WPB-1304) was a United States Coast Guard Island-class patrol boat homeported in Manama, Bahrain. She was named after the second-largest of the Hawaiian Islands, Maui.

== Overview ==
At 110 feet (34 m), USCGC Maui had excellent range & seakeeping ability, was equipped with advanced electronics and navigation equipment, and supported Coast Guard maritime homeland security, migrant interdiction, drug interdiction, defense readiness, fisheries Enforcement, and search and rescue missions. USCGC Maui was one of six Island class patrol boats stationed in Manama, Bahrain as a part of Patrol Forces Southwest Asia to provide the Navy's Fifth Fleet with combat ready assets.

Her keel was laid on 8 April 1985 and she was launched on 11 January 1986. Maui was commissioned on 9 May 1986.

== Service history ==
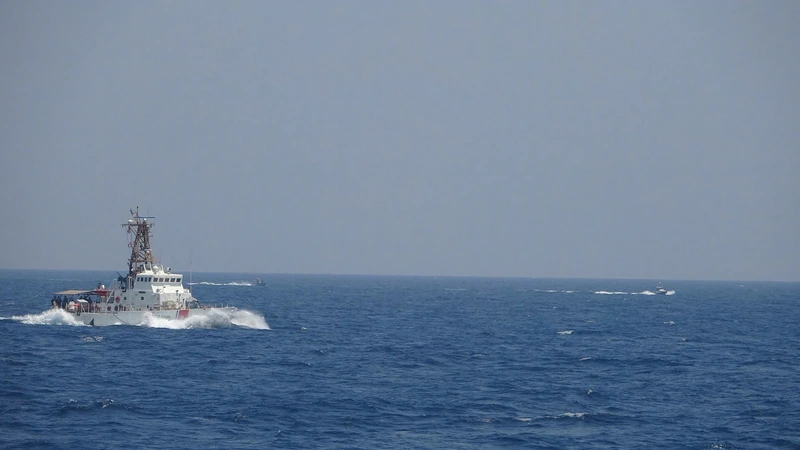
Two Iranian Islamic Revolutionary Guard Corps Navy fast in-shore attack craft, a type of speedboat armed with machine guns, conducted unsafe and unprofessional maneuvers while operating in close proximity to USCGC Maui (WPB 1304) as it transits the Strait of Hormuz with other U.S. naval vessels, May 10, 2021. (U.S. Navy)

CG Patrol Boat Squadron FOUR. Upon commissioning, USCGC Maui was assigned to Commander, Coast Guard Patrol Boat Squadron ONE (renamed FOUR in 1989), homeported in Miami Beach, Florida. When the expeditionary squadron was decommissioned in 1991, she was reassigned to Commander, Group Miami Beach.

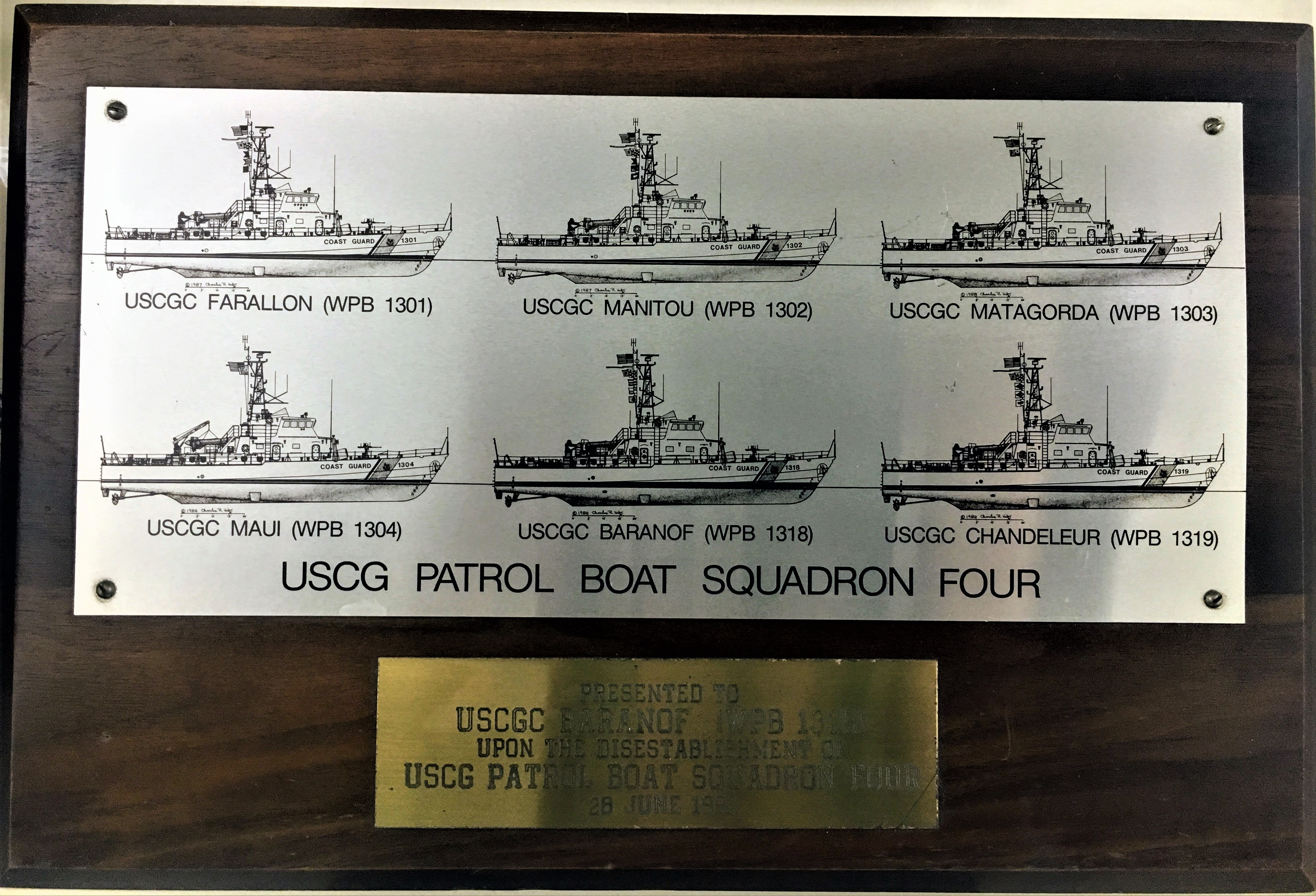
The cutters of Coast Guard Patrol Boat Squadron FOUR upon decommissioning.

CG Patrol Forces Southwest Asia. In 2004, USCGC Maui was redeployed as part of Patrol Forces Southwest Asia.

April 15, 2020 Incident On 15 April 2020, the Islamic Revolutionary Guard Corps navy harassed U.S. Navy & Coast Guard assets in the northern Persian Gulf, to include coming within 10 yards of USCGC Maui.

May 10, 2021 Incident On 10 May 2021, USCGC Maui made international headlines after firing 30 warning shots at a squadron of 13 Iranian Revolutionary Guard fast attack craft that were harassing a flotilla of six US Navy warships escorting the guided missile submarine USS Georgia. "This group of fast attack boats approached the U.S. formation at high speed, closing in as close as 150 yards," Pentagon Press Secretary John Kirby (admiral) said. "After following all the appropriate and established procedures involving ships: horn blast, bridge-to-bridge radio transmissions and other ways of communicating, the [U.S.] Coast Guard Cutter Maui fired approximately 30 warning shots from a 50 caliber Machine gun. After the second round of warning shots, the 13 fast-attack craft from the Islamic Revolutionary Guard Corps Navy broke contact."

On 19 May 2021, President Joe Biden alluded to Iranian fast-attack boat harassment and Maui during his keynote address at the US Coast Guard Academy's 140th Commencement ceremony: "Based alongside the United States Navy Fifth Fleet in Bahrain, you had to face down harassment of Iranian fast-attack boats in recent weeks. And in recent weeks, the U.S. Coast Guard Cutter Maui had to fire 30 warning shots to deter such irresponsible and unsafe maneuvers in the region."

Maui was decommissioned on 22 March 2022 after the arrival of a replacement fast response cutter.
