= Miastko =

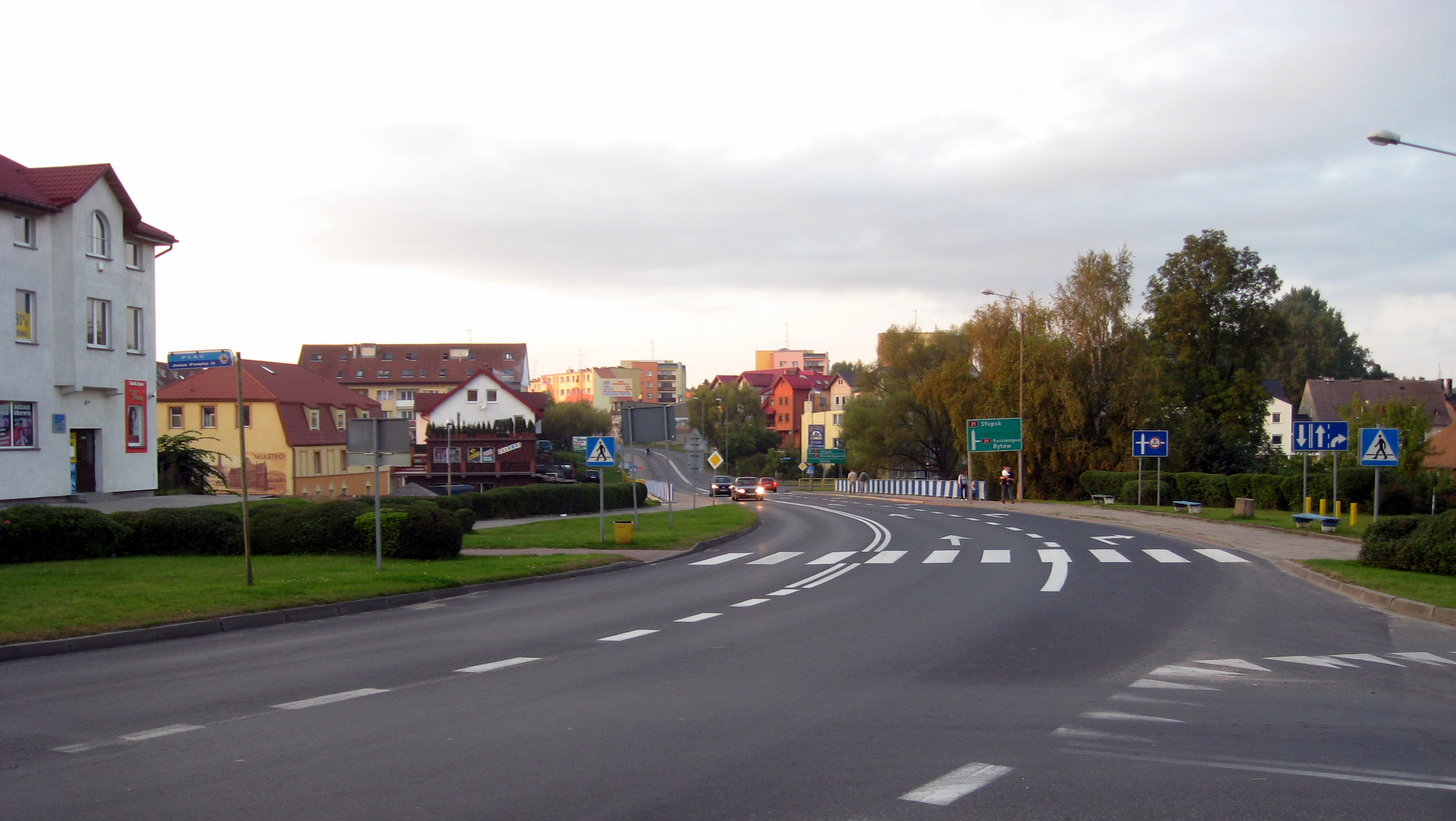
- Miastko in 2009

- Flag Coat of arms

- Location within Poland
- Coordinates: 54°1′N 16°59′E
- Country: Poland
- Voivodeship: Pomeranian
- County: Bytów
- Gmina: Miastko

Government
  - Mayor: Roman Ramion

Area
  - Total: 5.68 km^{2} (2.19 sq mi)

Population (2006)
  - Total: 10,738
  - Density: 1,890/km^{2} (4,900/sq mi)
- Postal code: 77–200
- Vehicle registration: GBY
- Website: http://www.miastko.pl/

Miastko [ˈmʲastkɔ] (Kashubian: Miastkò; German: Rummelsburg in Pommern), is a town in the Middle Pomerania region of northern Poland, administratively located in the Bytów County in the Pomeranian Voivodeship.

== History ==
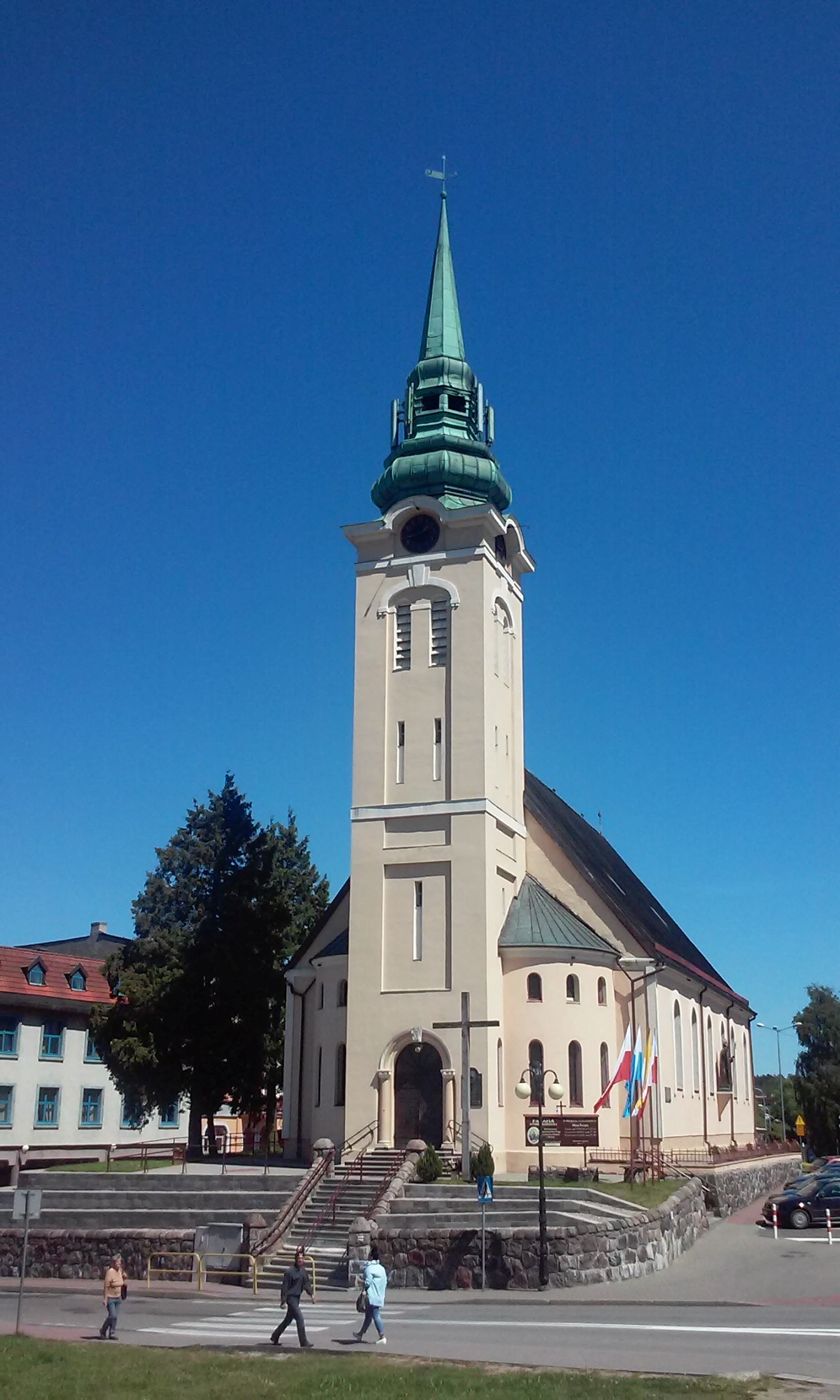
Baroque Church of Our Lady

Traces of human settlement of the Pomeranian and Wielbark cultures and from ancient Roman times and Early Middle Ages were discovered during archaeological excavations in Miastko. The area became part of the emerging Duchy of Poland under its first historic ruler Mieszko I in the 10th century. After the fragmentation of Poland in 1138, following the death of Bolesław III Wrymouth, it formed part of various smaller duchies, including the Duchy of Słupsk from 1368 and Duchy of Pomerania from 1478.

From the 18th century, it was part of the Kingdom of Prussia, within which it belonged to the Province of Pomerania. During World War II, the Polish resistance conducted espionage of German activity in the town. The Germans operated three forced labour subcamps of the Stalag II-B prisoner-of-war camp in the town. In January 1945, a German-perpetrated death march of Allied prisoners-of-war from the Stalag XX-B POW camp passed through the town. On 2 March 1945, it was taken by the Red Army.

In April 1945, a Polish operation group of 22 young men arrived in the town to take over administration of the town, while the German population was largely still present. The Potsdam Agreement confirmed preliminary Polish administration of the region and the native German populace was expelled. According to German reports, in January 1947, Germans to be expelled were collected and had to camp in ruined houses at min 25 degrees minus. British authorities of occupied Germany did not receive the expellees, whoh were interned until March 1947 in various internment camps. Of 2500 Germans of a transport scheduled for January 4, 1947, 500 were not to survive the expulsion.

Until 1975, Miastko was a county seat within the Koszalin Voivodeship, and from 1975 to 1998 it was administratively located in the Słupsk Voivodeship.

In 2012 a monument dedicated to the Polish Nation was unveiled in the town park.

== Population ==
Historical population

Year	Pop.	±%
1871	4,707	—
1877	4,783	+1.6%
1880	5,304	+10.9%
1890	5,080	−4.2%
1900	5,335	+5.0%
1910	5,934	+11.2%
1925	6,682	+12.6%

Year	Pop.	±%
1950	3,875	−42.0%
1960	5,498	+41.9%
1970	8,100	+47.3%
1980	10,000	+23.5%
2004	12,000	+20.0%
2016	10,738	−10.5%

== Transport ==
Miastko is located on the intersection of the national roads 20 and 21 and voivodeship road 206. There is also a railway station.

== Gallery ==
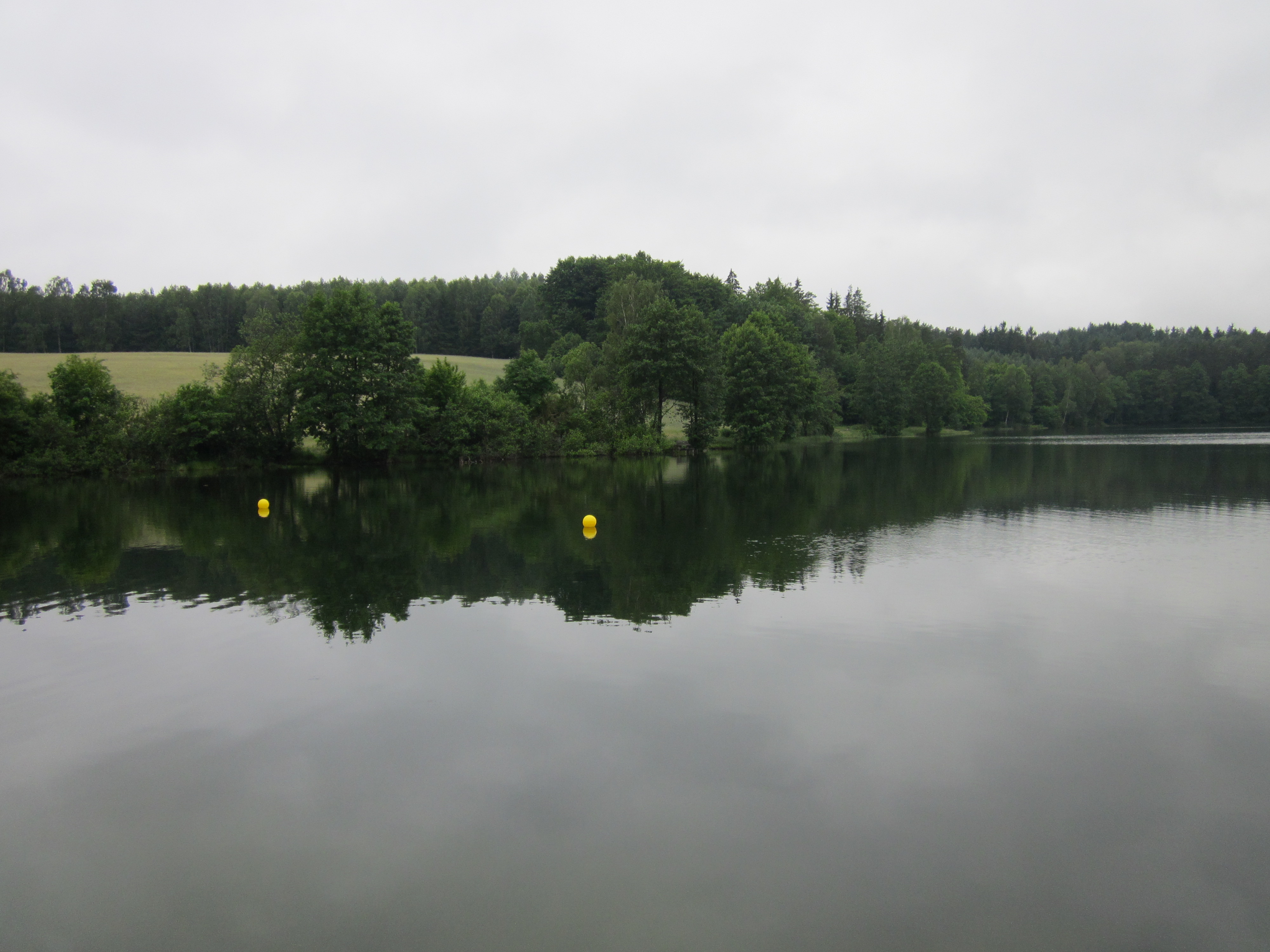
Lake Lednik

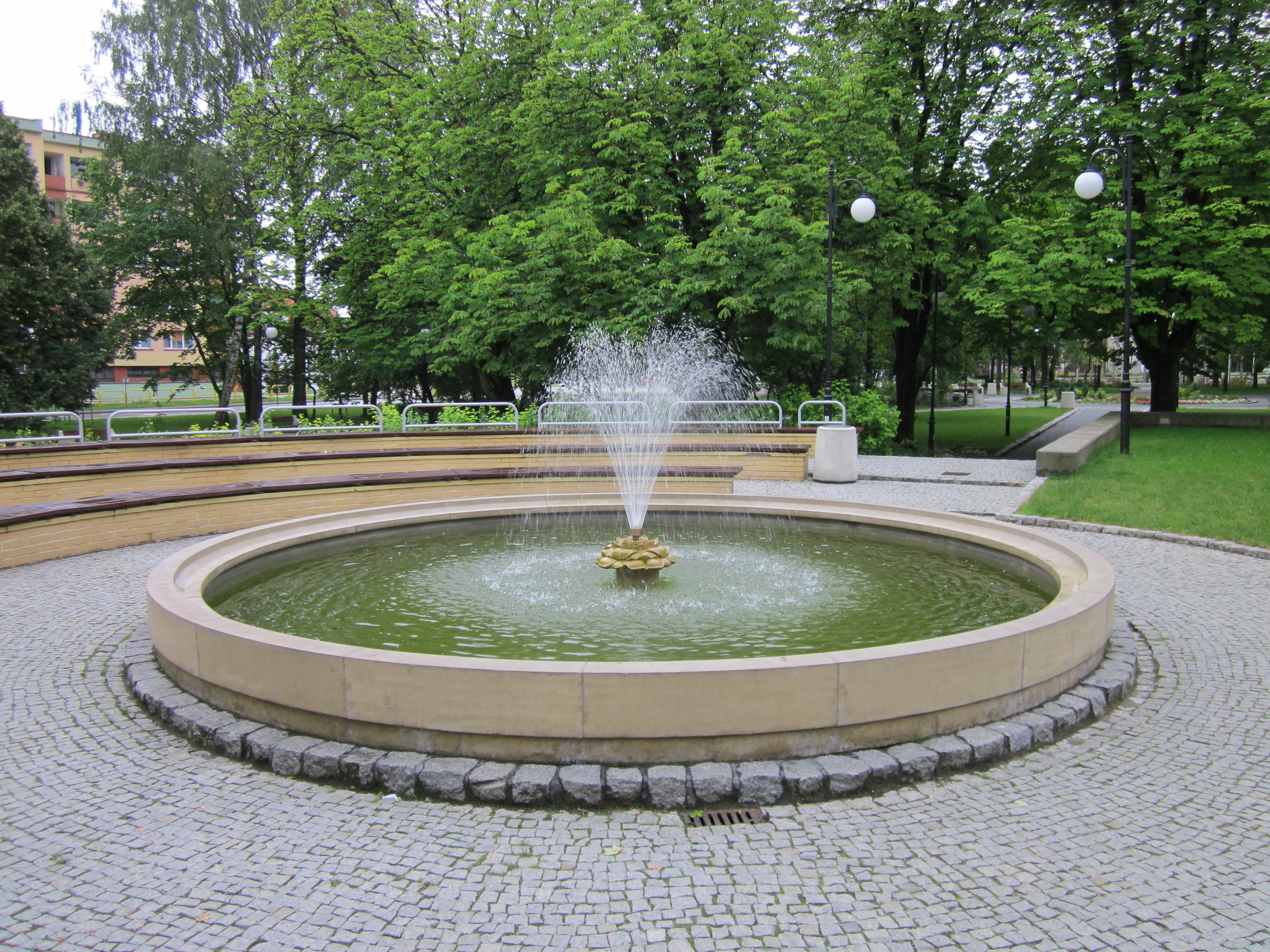
Park

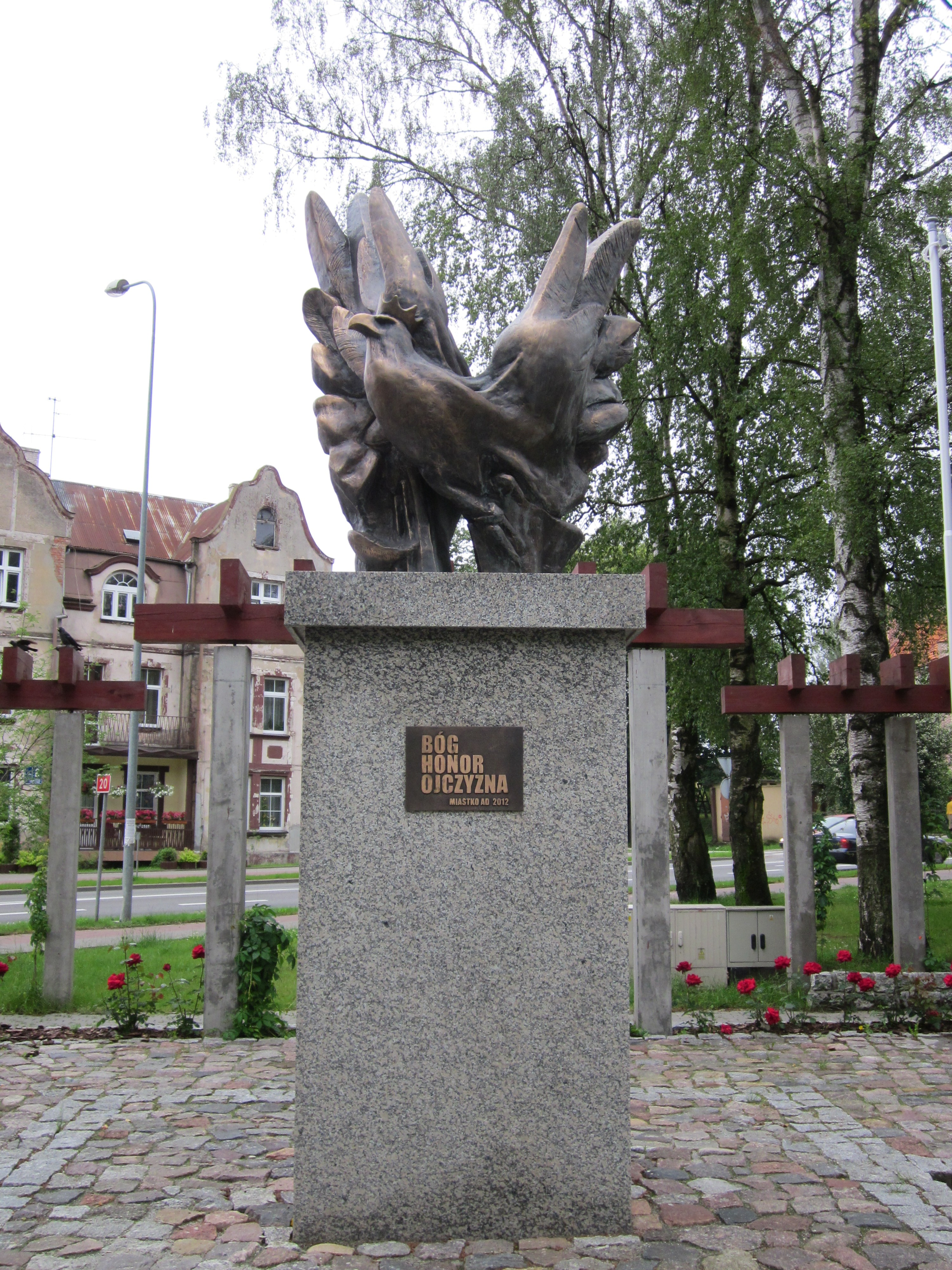
Polish Nation Monument

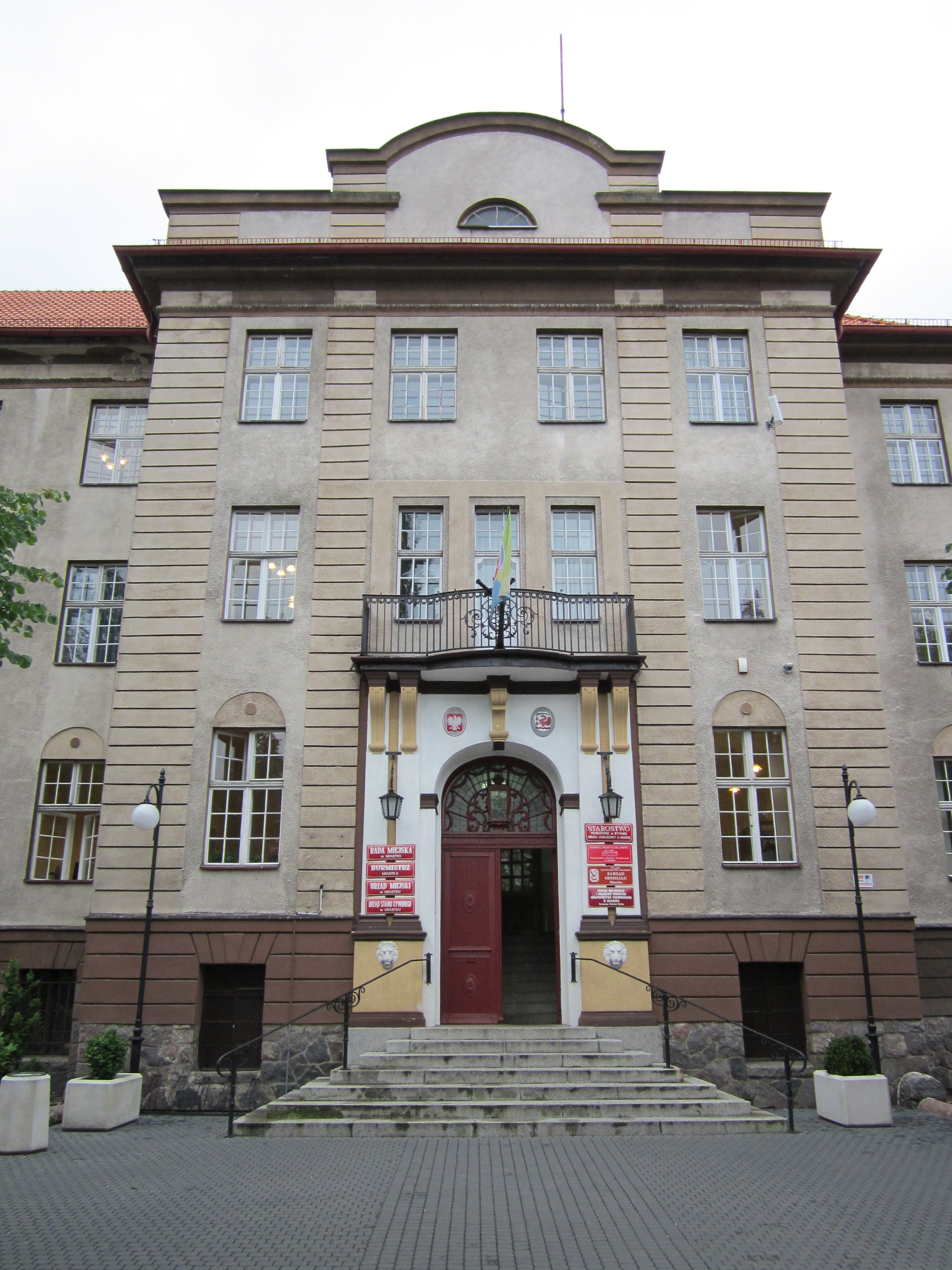
Town hall

== Notable residents ==
- Julius Heinrich Franz (1847–1913) a German astronomer
- Tadeusz Sapierzyński (born 1958) a Polish Army officer, former commander of the special forces unit JW GROM
- Krzysztof Gliszczyński (born 1962) a Polish painter
- Ewa Gawryluk (born 1967) a Polish actress
- Wojciech Kałdowski (born 1976) a retired Polish 800 metre runner

== International relations ==
Miastko is twinned with:

Périers, France	Bad Fallingbostel, Germany
