= Gliszczyński =

Gliszczyński (feminine: Gliszczyńska; plural: Gliszczyńscy) is a Polish surname. Notable people with this surname include:

- Irmina Gliszczyńska (born 1992), Polish sailor
- Krzysztof Gliszczyński (born 1962), Polish painter
