= General Tadeusz Kościuszko Military University of Land Forces =

Coordinates: 51.1501°N 17.0586°E

- Akademia Wojsk Lądowych imienia generała Tadeusza Kościuszki
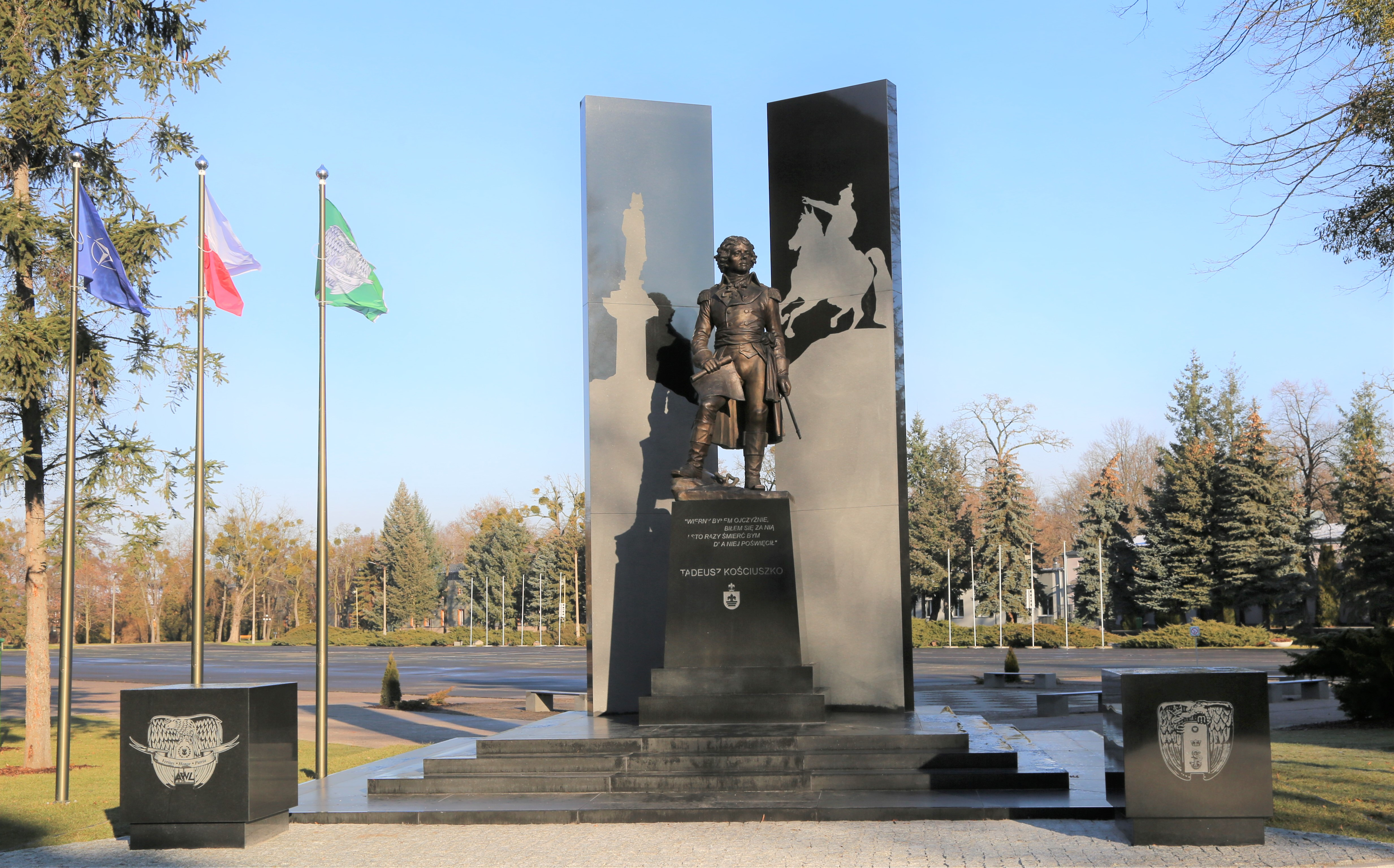
- Motto: Truth, Honor, Fatherland (Latin: Veritas, Honor, Patria)
- Type: Land Forces military university
- Established: 2002
- Students: 2,257 (12.2023)
- Location: Wrocław, Lower Silesian Voivodeship, Poland
- Colours: Red and white
- Website: Official site
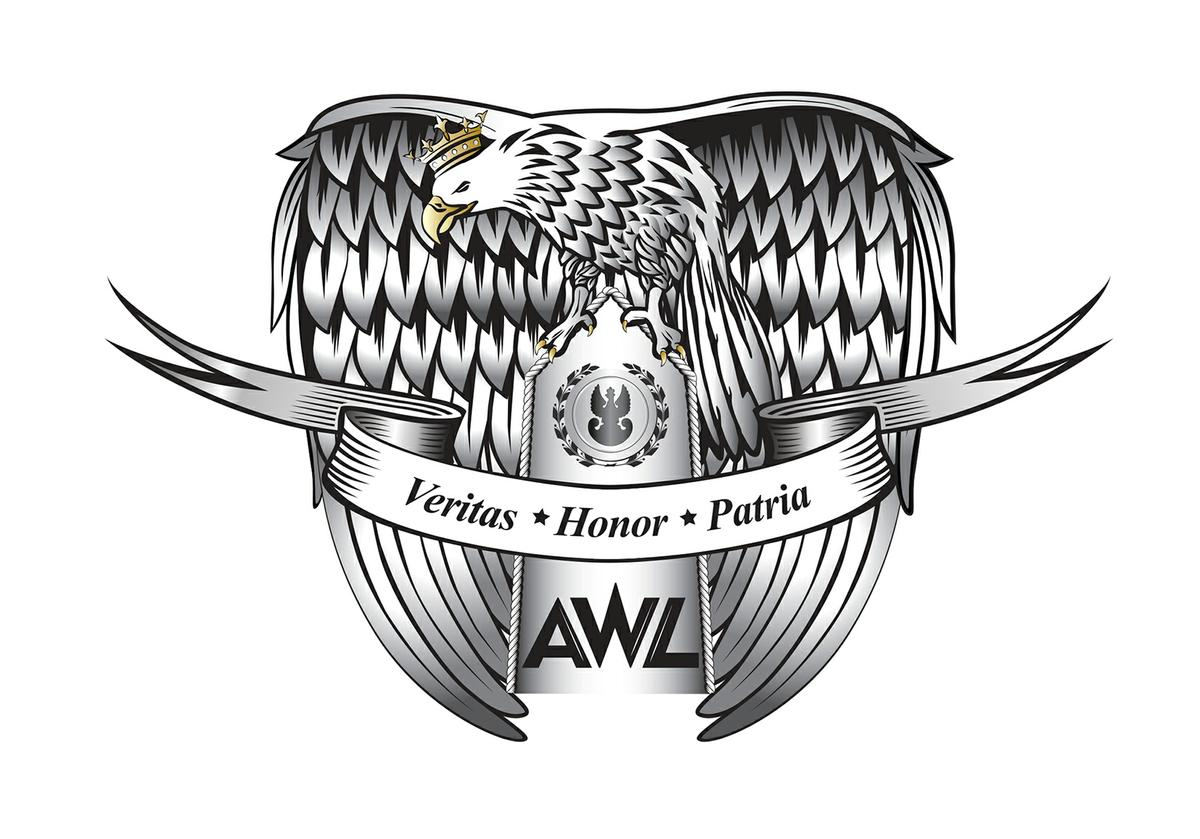

The General Tadeusz Kościuszko Military University of Land Forces (Akademia Wojsk Lądowych imienia generała Tadeusza Kościuszki) is a Polish Land Forces military university, in Wrocław, Poland, which trains officers to serve in Polish Land Forces units.

Established in 2002, its antecedents date back to the Polish–Lithuanian Commonwealth.

== Alumni ==
- Pavle Jurišić Šturm
- Włodzimierz Potasiński
- Roman Polko
- Tadeusz Sapierzyński
- Zdzisław Żurawski
- Kazimierz Gilarski
