= Umm Qasr Port =

- Umm Qasr Port in 2020
- Interactive map of Umm Qasr Port

Location
- Country: Iraq
- Location: Umm Qasr, Basra, Iraq
- Coordinates: 30.05335°N 47.93756°E
- UN/LOCODE: IQUQR

Details
- Opened: 1967
- Owned by: Iraqi Government

Umm Qasr Port is Iraq's only deep water port, part of the city of Umm Qasr.

Iraq's second biggest port in scale of size and goods shipped, ranking behind the port of Basra, it is strategically important, located on the western edge of the al-Faw peninsula, where the mouth of the Shatt al Arab waterway enters the Persian Gulf. It is separated from the border of Kuwait by a small inlet. Prior to the Persian Gulf War, traffic between Kuwait and Iraq flowed over a bridge. The port is part of the Maritime Silk Road.

== History ==
Umm Qasr was originally a small fishing town, but was said to have been the site of Alexander the Great's landing in Mesopotamia in 325 BC. During the Second World War a temporary port was established there by the Allies to unload supplies to dispatch to the Soviet Union. It fell back into obscurity after the war, but the government of King Faisal II sought to establish a permanent port there in the 1950s.

In 1958 after the coup d'etat of the Iraqi Army known as the 14 July Revolution, the Iraqi Navy established a base there. The new regime of General Abdul-Karim Qassem undertook mass planning of the economy of Iraq, based on oil export and factory based production, which required new shipping facilities. Founded in 1961, it was intended to serve as Iraq's only "deep water" port, reducing the country's dependence on the disputed Shatt al-Arab waterway that marks the border with Iran. The port facilities were built by a consortium of companies from West Germany, Sweden and Lebanon, with Iraqi Republic Railways services connecting it to Basra and Baghdad. The port opened for business in July 1967.

=== Iran–Iraq War ===
During the Iran–Iraq War (1980–88), the ports importance increased as fighting restricted access to other ports further east along the Shatt al-Arab. The port of Basra, located on the Shatt al-Arab waterway, became unusable as it was just miles from the Iranian border.

=== First Gulf War ===
After the 1991 First Gulf War, during which the port was bombed, control of the inlet leading to Umm Qasr was transferred to Kuwait. Under control of Allied Forces for a period, in defence planning for Kuwait, the bridge was removed and a large trench and sand berm was constructed along the border of the two nations.

Once the port was returned to the Iraqi Government of Saddam Hussein, he shifted most of the commerce from the port of Basra to Umm Qasr, in a deliberate Iraqi government policy to punish Basra for its role in the rebellions against his rule.

=== Second Gulf War ===
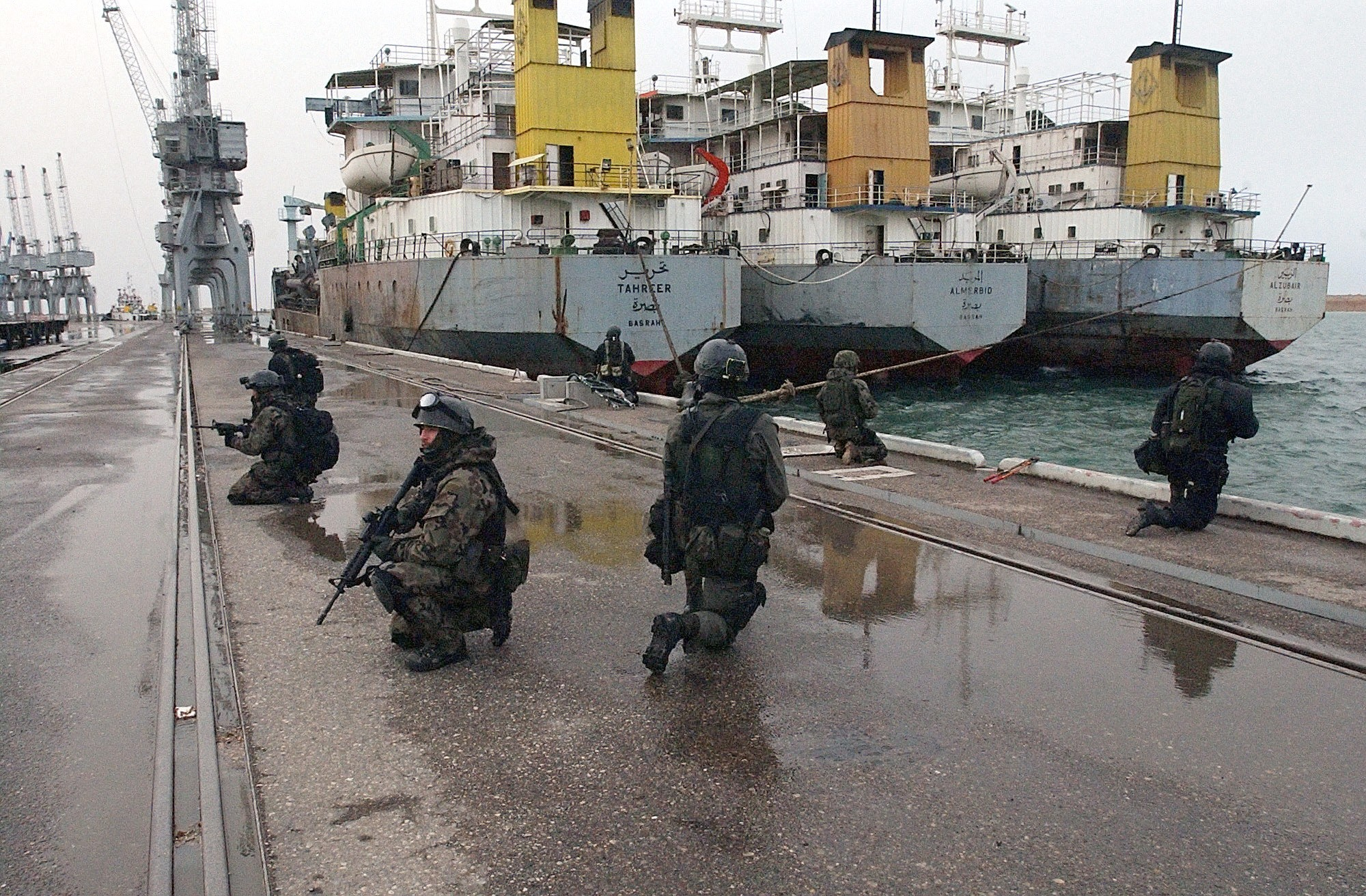
Polish GROM troops on alert immediately after the ports capture during the Battle of Umm Qasr

The Battle of Umm Qasr was the first military confrontation in the Iraq War, with its objective the capture of the port.

On March 21, 2003, the battle was started with an amphibious assault by British 3 Commando Brigade of the Royal Marines, and spearheaded on land by the US 15th Marine Expeditionary Unit, supported by Polish GROM troops. Iraqi forces put up unexpectedly strong resistance, requiring several days' fighting before the area was cleared of defenders. After the waterway was de-mined by a Detachment from HM-14 and Naval Special Clearance Team ONE of the U.S. Navy and reopened, Umm Qasr played an important role in the shipment of humanitarian supplies to Iraqi civilians.

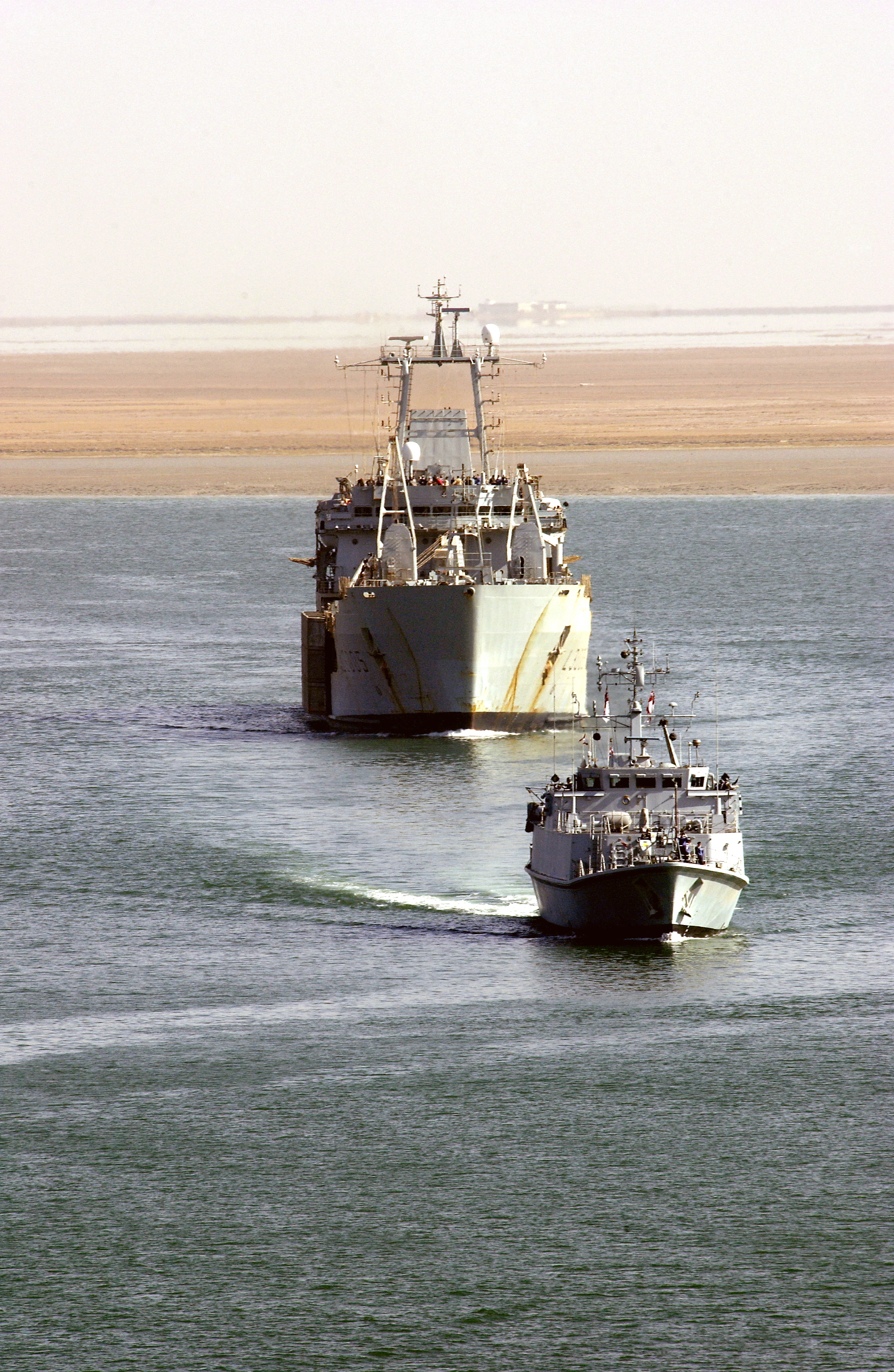
The Royal Fleet Auxiliary, Lananding Ship Logistic RFA Sir Galahad arrives in the port on 28 March 2003, delivering the first shipment of humanitarian aid from coalition forces

The port was declared safe and open on March 25, 2003, after Royal Marines took over control of the port and conducted raids into the old part of town. Coalition minesweepers, including HMS Bangor (M109), aided by US Navy divers, MH-53E Sea Dragon helicopters towing magnetic minesweeping sleds, unmanned underwater vehicles, EOD divers, plus trained dolphins and seals; located and cleared the approach to the port of underwater mines. On 28 March a 200-yard-wide channel was declared safe, and the Royal Fleet Auxiliary RFA Sir Galahad docked to begin offloading hundreds of tons of food and water. Work continued for six weeks after that, widening the channel.

=== Reconstruction ===
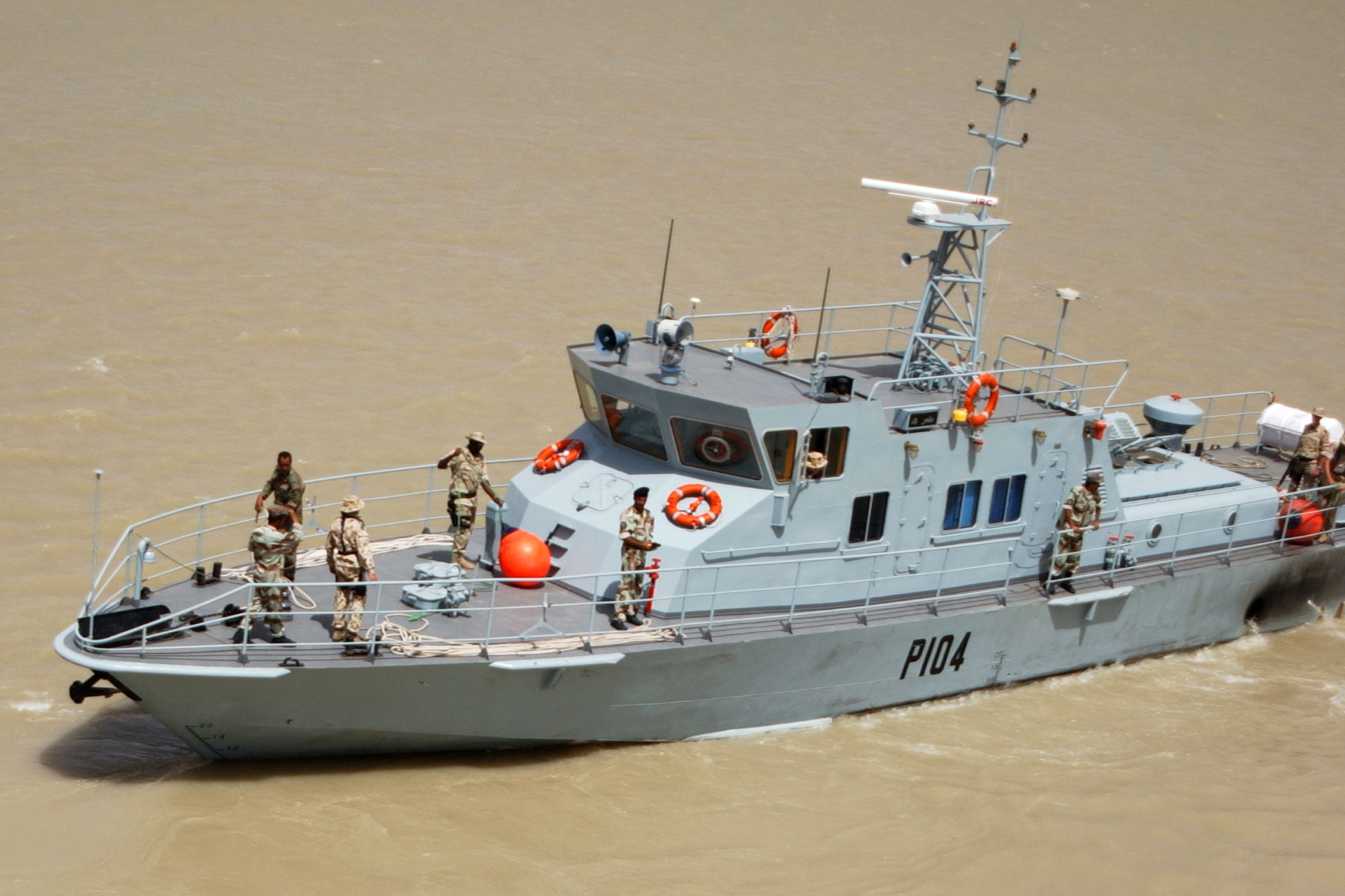
New Iraqi Navy patrol boat in Port of Umm Qasr

On 23 May 2003, control of the facility was transferred from the Spanish Army operating under the Royal Marines, to Stevedoring Service of America (SSA). The company is responsible for both operations as well as restoration and renovation of the facility, which will be turned over to Iraqi civilian control when it is fully operational.

In January 2004 it was announced that work would start on a $10.3 million project to renovate the Umm Qasr Naval Base, funded through the Project Management Office (PMO) of the Coalition Provisional Authority. To enable the Iraqi security forces the facilities they need for the defence of their country, the project includes building renovation; construction of electrical, water and sanitary sewage systems; security improvements; dock repair and dredging. The prime contractor was Weston Solutions, Inc. of West Chester, Pennsylvania, who completed the work in mid-May 2004.

== See also ==
- List of ports in Iraq
