= Marian Sowiński =

Polish general (born 1951)

- Born: August 26, 1951 (age 74); Ruda, Poland
- Allegiance: Poland
- Branch: Polish Land Forces
- Rank: Generał brygady
- Commands: GROM

Gen. Marian Sowiński (born August 26, 1951, in Ruda) is a Polish general.

Brigadier-General Marian Sowiński has been commander of the special forces unit "GROM" (Thunder) from December 19, 1995, until December 6, 1997.
