= Sławomir Petelicki =

Polish general (1946–2012)

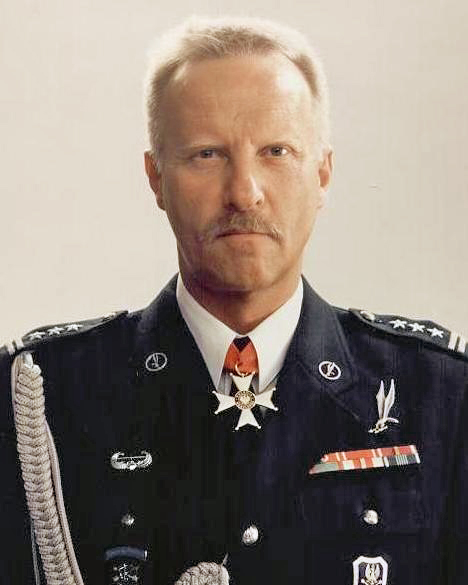
- Colonel Sławomir Petelicki in 1997.
- Born: September 13, 1946; Warsaw, Poland
- Died: June 16, 2012 (aged 65); Warsaw, Poland
- Spouse: Agnieszka Petelicka
- Military career
- Allegiance: Poland
- Branch: Polish Land Forces
- Service years: 1969–1999
- Rank: Brigadier General
- Unit: GROM
- Conflicts: Operation Uphold Democracy
- Awards: Polonia Restituta 3rd Class Polonia Restituta 4th Class Polonia Restituta 5th Class Cross of Merit for Bravery Gold Cross of Merit Silver Cross of Merit Gold Medal of Merit for National Defence Silver Medal of Merit for National Defence Legion of Merit (USA) Army Commendation Medal (USA)

Brigadier General Sławomir Petelicki (13 September 1946 – 16 June 2012) was the first commander of the Polish special forces unit GROM from July 13, 1990, until December 19, 1995. Later, he was the head of the Foundation of Former GROM Soldiers.

== Biography ==
Sławomir Petelicki was born on September 13, 1946, in Warsaw. In 1969, he graduated from the Law Faculty of the Warsaw University. The same year he joined the I Department (Intelligence) Ministry of Internal Affairs of People's Republic of Poland and, until 1990, he served at various posts in the intelligence service. On various posts in Polish embassies abroad he was responsible for counter-intelligence. Since 1973 a military advisor at the Polish consulate in New York. Upon his return to Poland he continued his service in the economical intelligence. After a brief stay in Sweden between 1983 and 1987, where he served as the head of the Polish intelligence in the embassy in Stockholm, he returned to Poland where he was assigned to the Ministry of Foreign Affairs as the commanding officer of all the security services guarding Polish embassies and consulates.

Apart from his intelligence service, Petelicki was also an active member of special forces. He gained extensive experience in reconnaissance and diversion. Very little is known of the missions he was part of, apart from the missions to North Vietnam in 1971 and to China the following year.

In 1990, Petelicki was assigned to a newly formed, then top secret JW 2305 special forces. Initially consisting only of himself, the unit was soon expanded to become GROM. For the first several years the unit remained completely secret. It was first reported to the press in 1992 and became known to the public in 1994, after their first major military operation in Haiti. Dismissed on December 19, 1995, Petelicki remained unassigned.

Between May 14 and June 13 of 1996, Petelicki was the deputy Prime Minister for fighting organized crime. On December 7, 1997, he was again assigned as the commanding officer of the GROM unit. On August 15, 1998, the Day of the Polish Army, he was promoted by president Aleksander Kwaśniewski to the rank of brigadier general. On September 17, 1999, he finally gave up the command of GROM and retired. Thereafter, he headed the Foundation of Former GROM Soldiers, which helps veterans to meld into society.

In his later years, he openly criticized the Polish Government and condemned Polish president Bronisław Komorowski. He was considered a hero by various right-wing groups because of similarities in their beliefs. He also accused Polish premier Donald Tusk of high treason.

== Death ==
On June 16, 2012, Petelicki's wife found his body lying next to his car parked in the garage of their apartment block in Warsaw. According to the police, Petelicki died from a self-inflicted gunshot to his head. Apart from the bullet entrance and exit wounds in his temples, no other injuries were found on his body, and security cameras did not record the presence of any other people in the garage at the time of his death, leading the police to conclude that Petelicki had committed suicide. He has left no suicide note.

== Awards ==
During his military career, Sławomir Petelicki was awarded with some of the most notable military medals, including the following:

- Order of Polonia Restituta, Commanders' Cross (1995)
- Order of Polonia Restituta, Officers' Cross
- Order of Polonia Restituta, Knights' Cross
- Cross of Merit for Bravery (1995)
- Golden Cross of Merit
- Silver Cross of Merit
- Golden Medal of Merit for National Defence
- Silver Medal of Merit for National Defence
- Officer of the Legion of Merit (USA)
- Army Commendation Medal (USA)
- Air Assault Badge (USA)

In addition, Petelicki was an honorary member of the 5th and 10th Special Forces Groups of the American "Green Berets" and a bearer of the Golden GROM Badge with Wreath. During his career he accomplished parachute, sniper and diver training. He also gained the I dan in Judo and was a specialist in helicopter landing. Popular among the journalists and mass media, Petelicki was also awarded with the title of Gentleman of the Year 2000 by the Gentleman monthly.

== See also ==
- Polish Army
