= Entire M =

Polish company

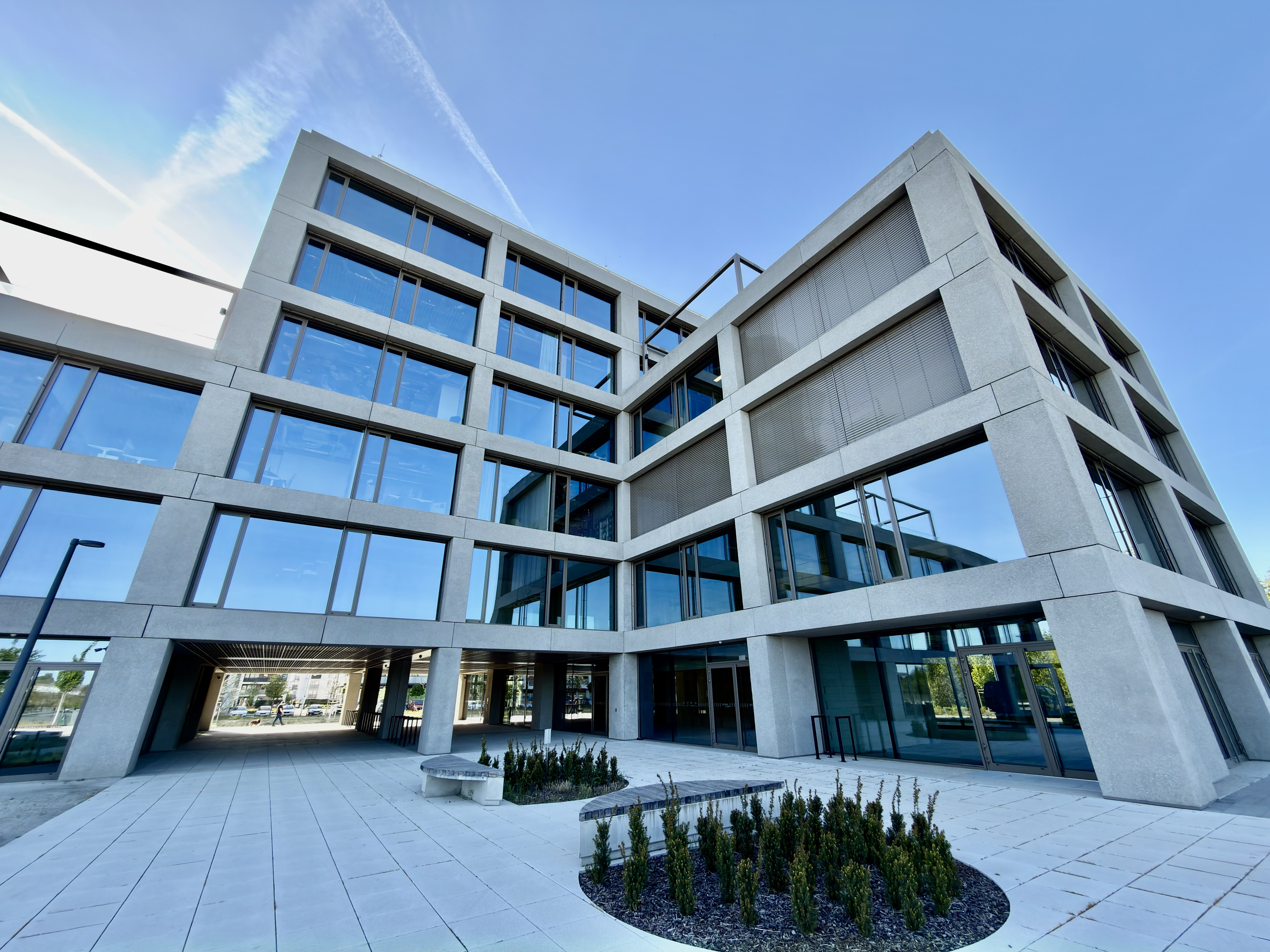
- Native name: Entire M sp. z o.o.
- Type: Private
- Industry: Military and outdoor equipment
- Founded: 1983; 43 years ago
- Founder: Grzegorz Mieszczak
- Headquarters: Wrocław, Lower Silesia Voivodeship, Poland
- Area served: Worldwide
- Key people: Jędrzej Mieszczak (CEO)
- Brands: Direct Action, Helikon-Tex
- Website: www.entirem.com

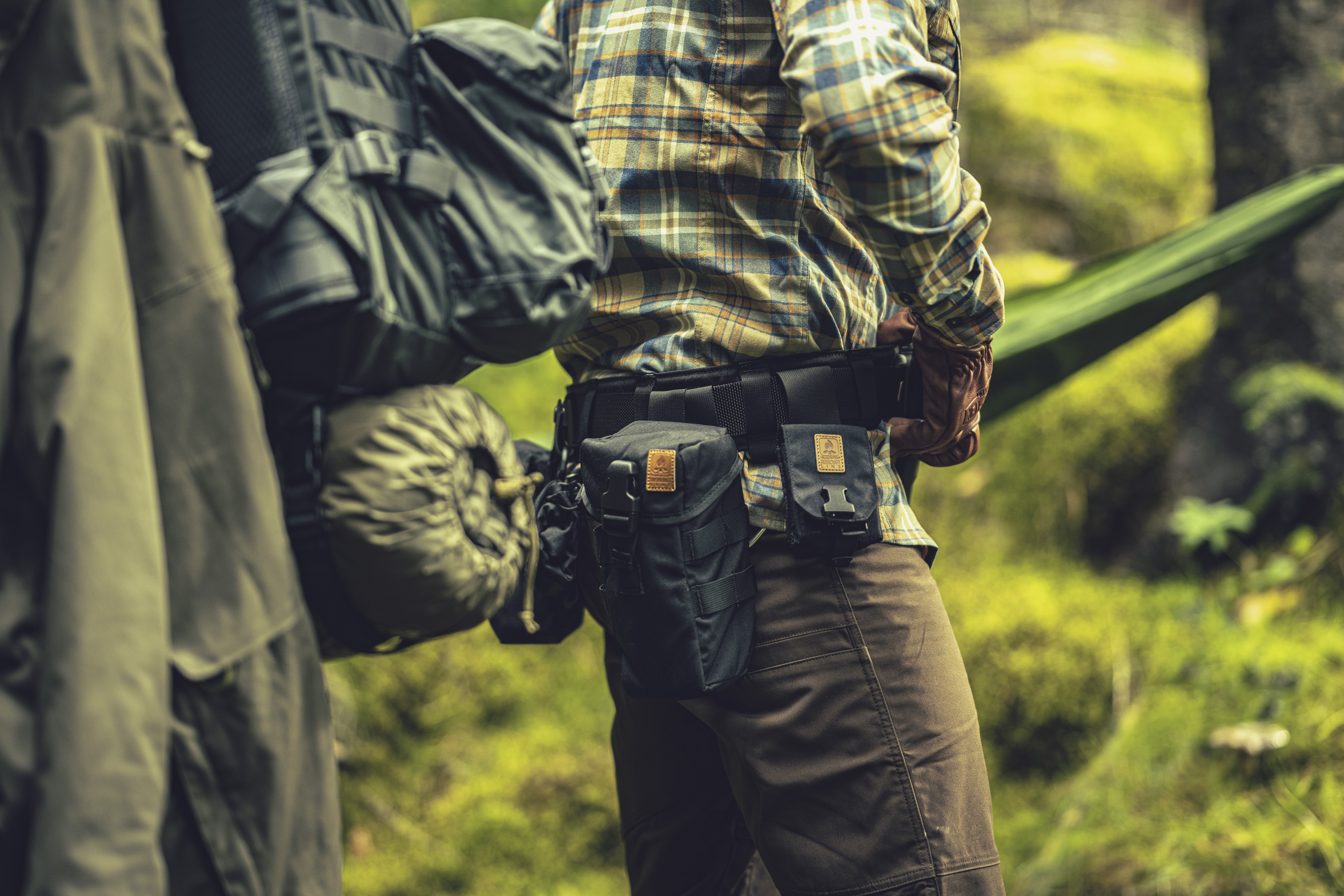
Helikon-Tex equipment

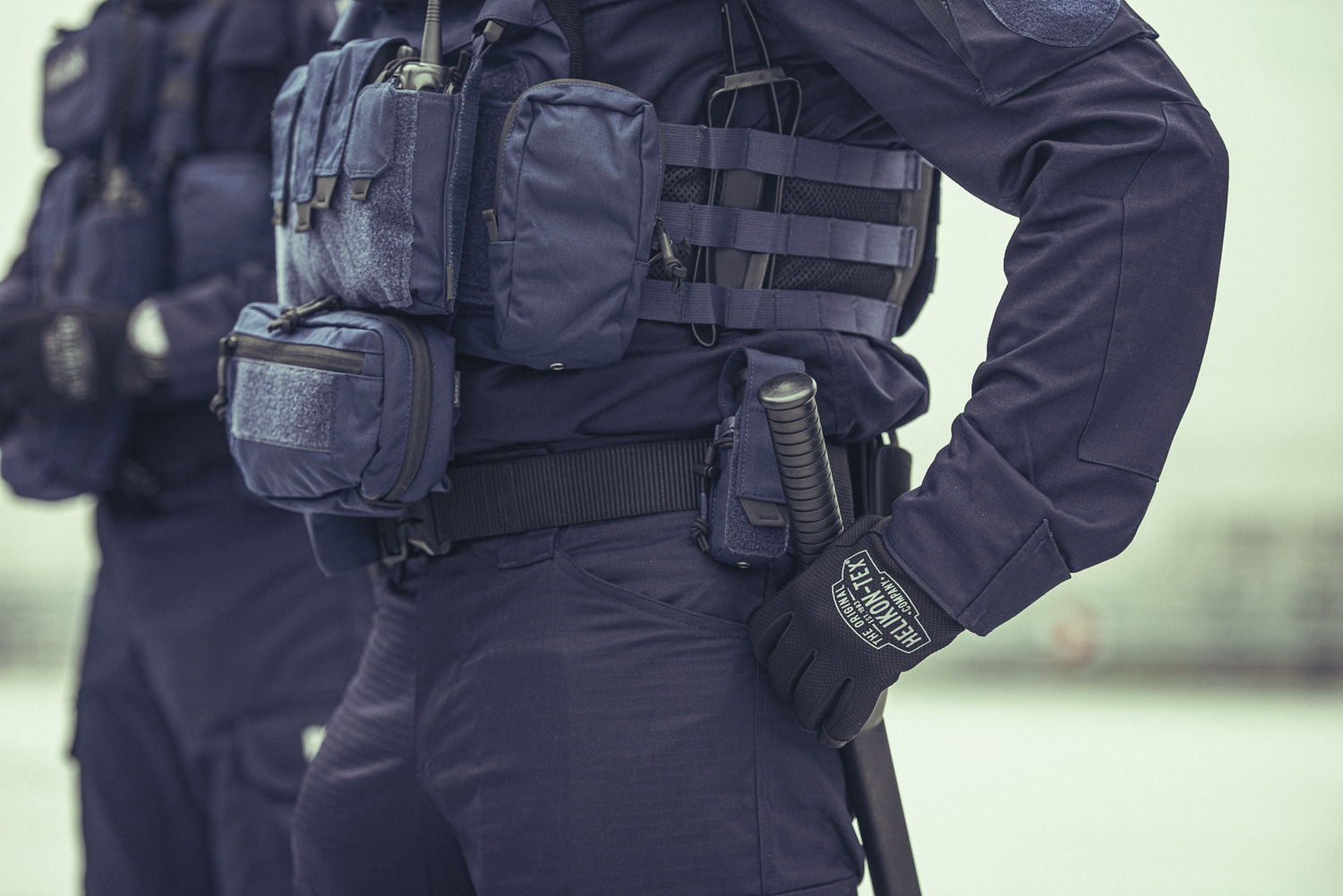
Helikon-Tex equipment

Entire M sp. z o.o. is a Polish company headquartered in Wrocław (Poland), operating internationally in the design and manufacture of military and outdoor clothing and equipment. The company manages the brands Helikon-Tex and Direct Action and distributes selected third-party products.

== History ==
Entire M was founded in 1983 by Grzegorz Mieszczak, initially focusing on the trade of military surplus equipment. Until November 2021, the company operated under the name Helikon-Tex. The current name, Entire, reflects the company's end-to-end operational model, while the letter M references both the founder's surname and the military industry from which the business originated.

In 1991 Entire M became the exclusive distributor of Morakniv knives in Poland. In 1998 the company established a logistics centre and office facilities in Miękinia, near Wrocław.

In 1999 Entire M launched its Research & Innovation Department, composed of field experts and professionals. This unit began designing solutions for both civilian outdoor and shooting enthusiasts, as well as professional tactical users.

== Operations and production ==
The company's headquarters is located in Wrocław, while its logistics centre, product development team, and quality control department are based in Błonie, in the Miękinia municipality near Wrocław. Entire M also maintains branches in the United States and Taiwan.

As of 2023, Entire M employed an average of 314 people across its Polish facilities – an increase of 94 from the previous year. The total team exceeds 350 professionals, including military and tactical experts, designers, engineers, fashion buyers, seamstresses, and operations specialists.

The company is currently managed by Jędrzej Mieszczak (CEO), Piotr Mieszczak (Vice President), and Piotr Chrobot (board member).

Entire M operates in compliance with ISO 9001 and AQAP 2110 quality management systems.

== Brands ==
- Helikon-Tex – clothing and equipment for outdoor and tactical users; the brand is regularly presented at Polish defence exhibitions.
- Direct Action – tactical equipment line manufactured in Poland; selected products have been procured by Polish special-operations units and NATO military forces.

=== Direct Action ===
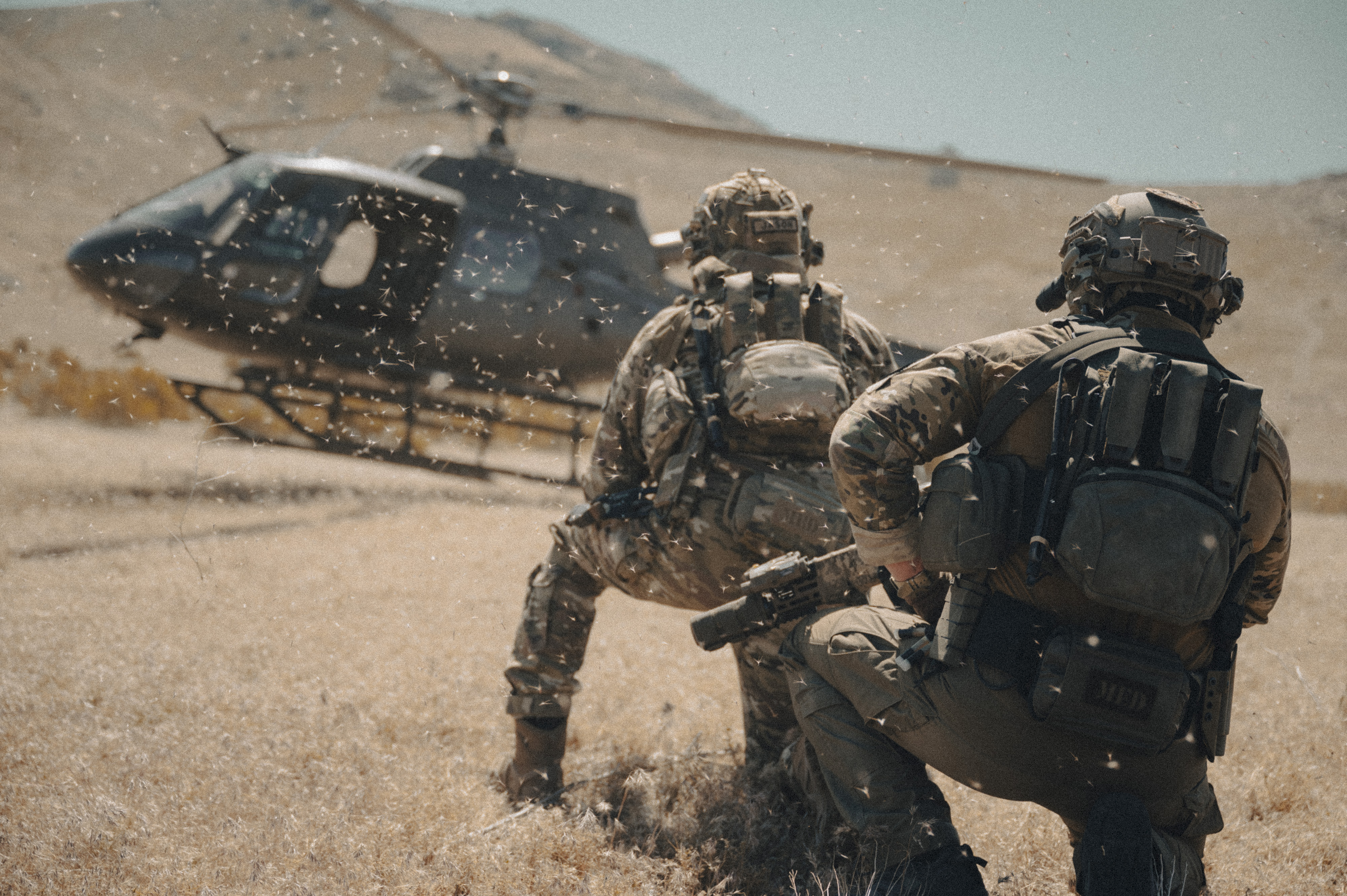
Direct Action gear

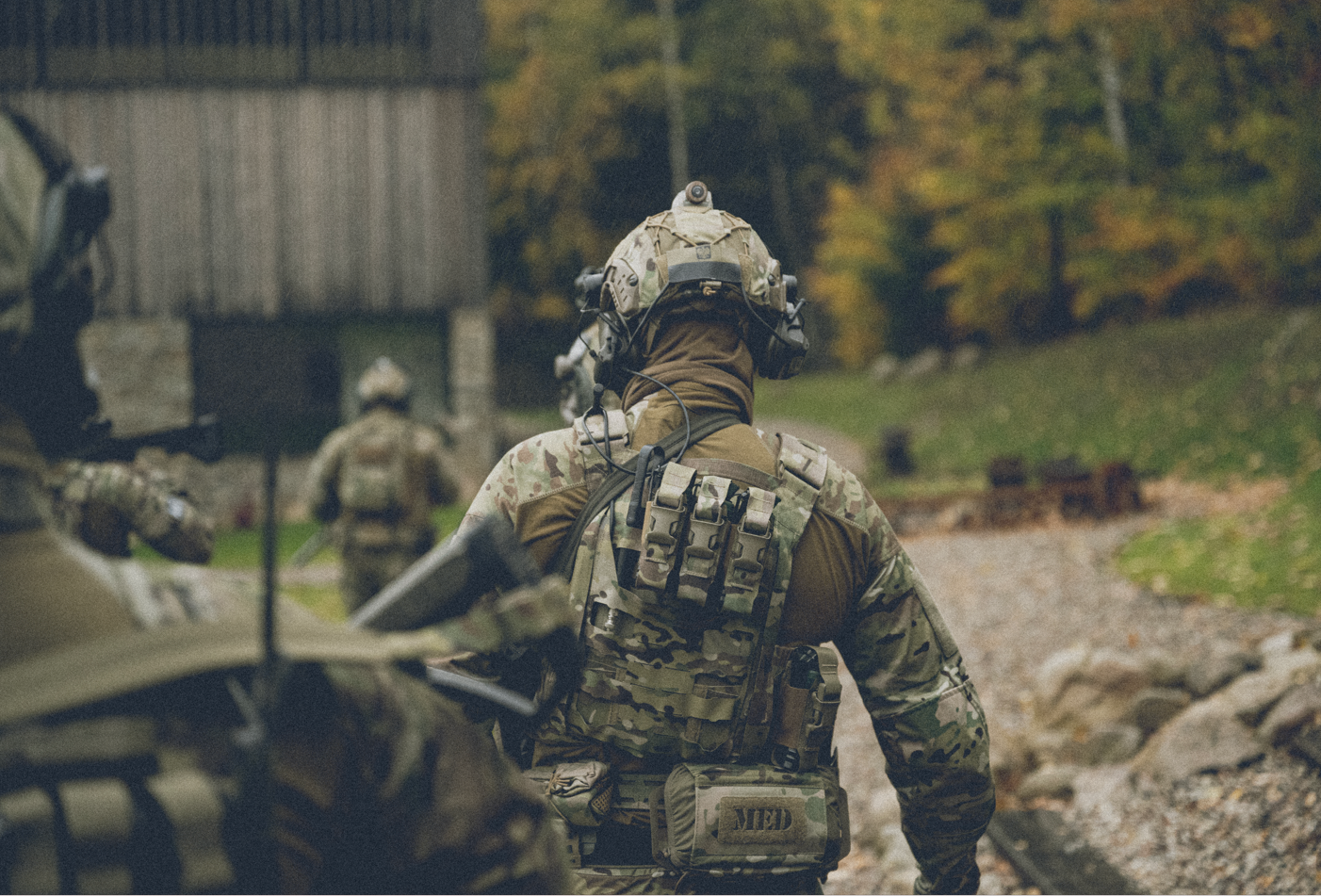
Direct Action gear

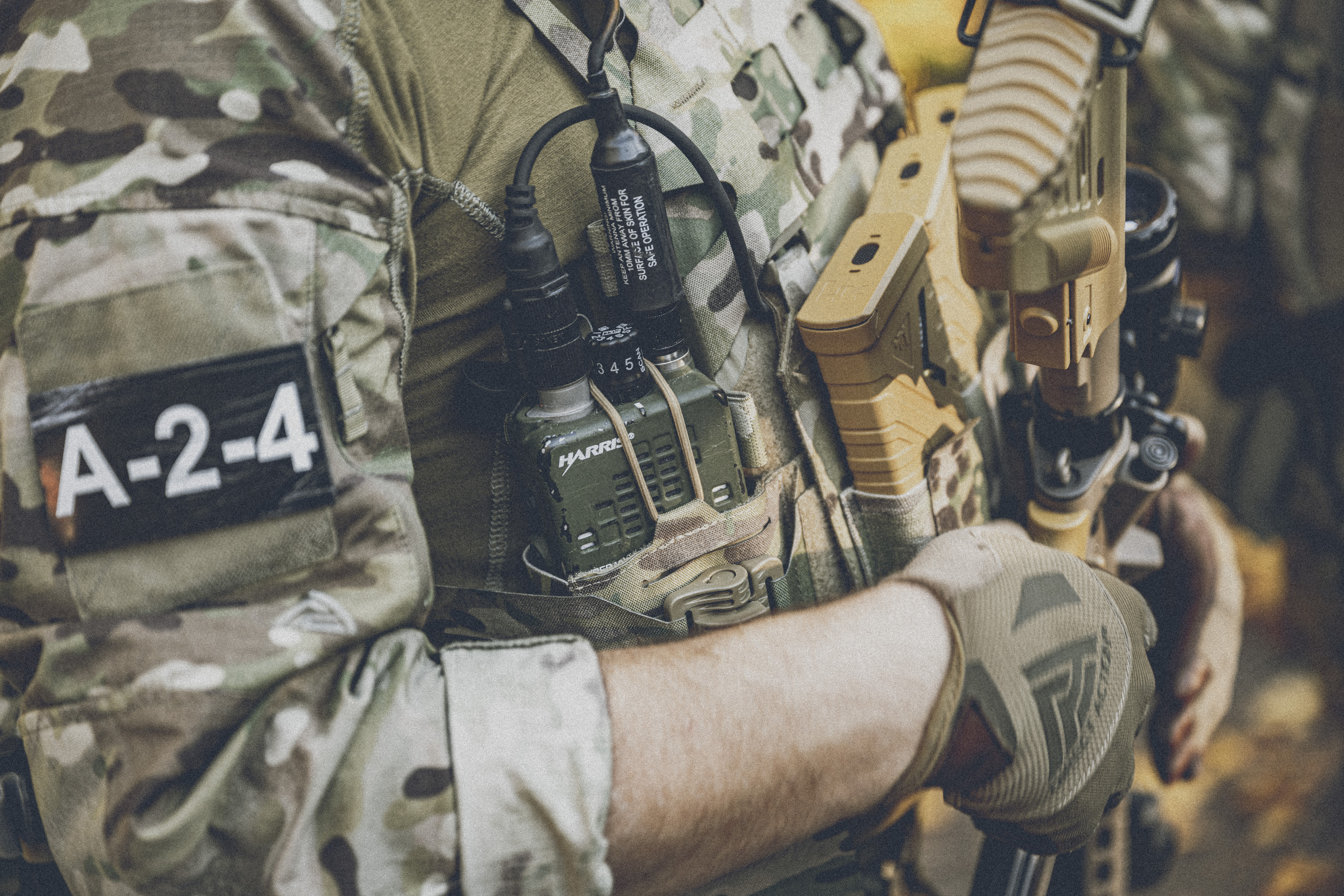
Direct Action gear

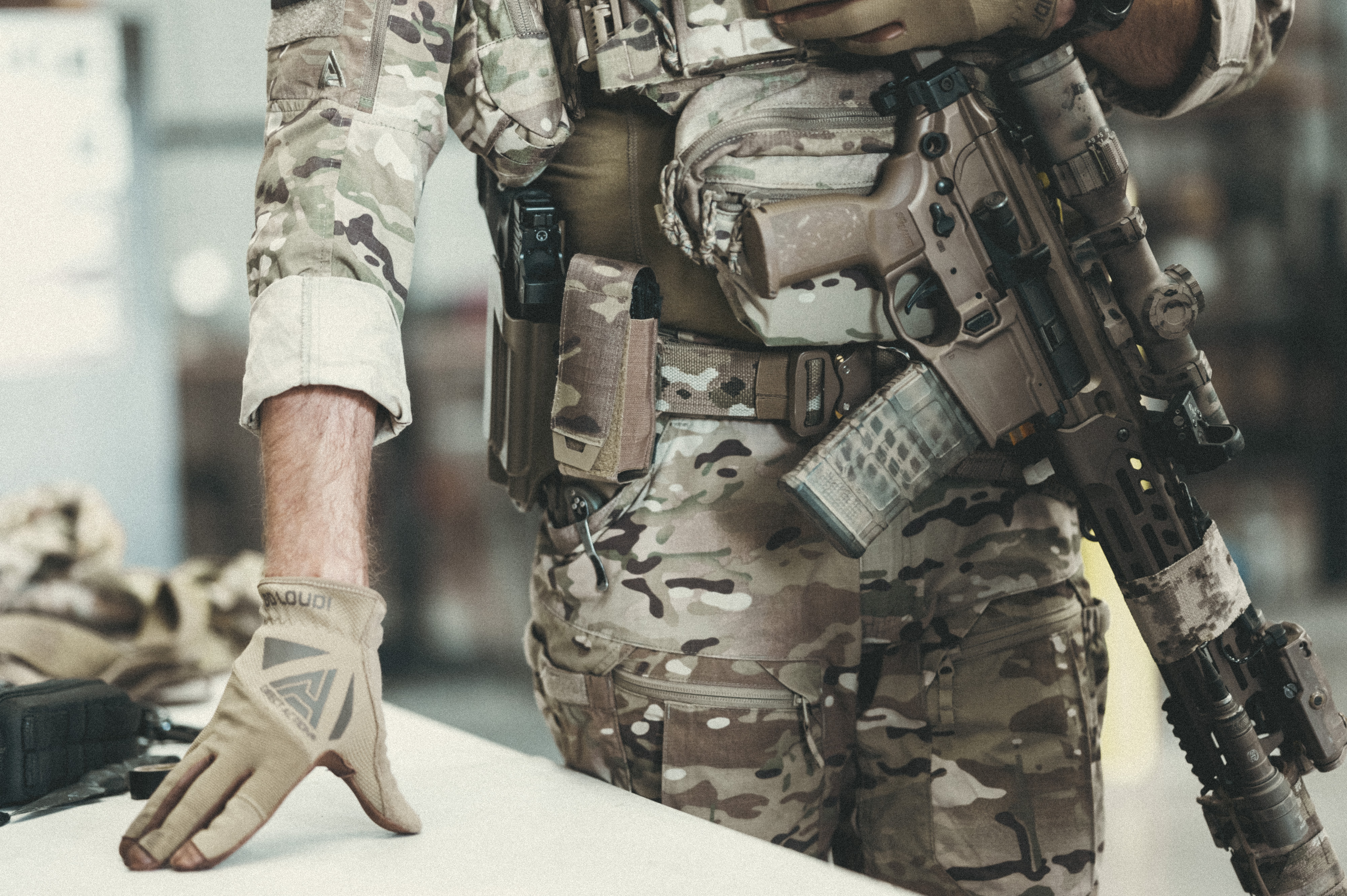
Direct Action gear

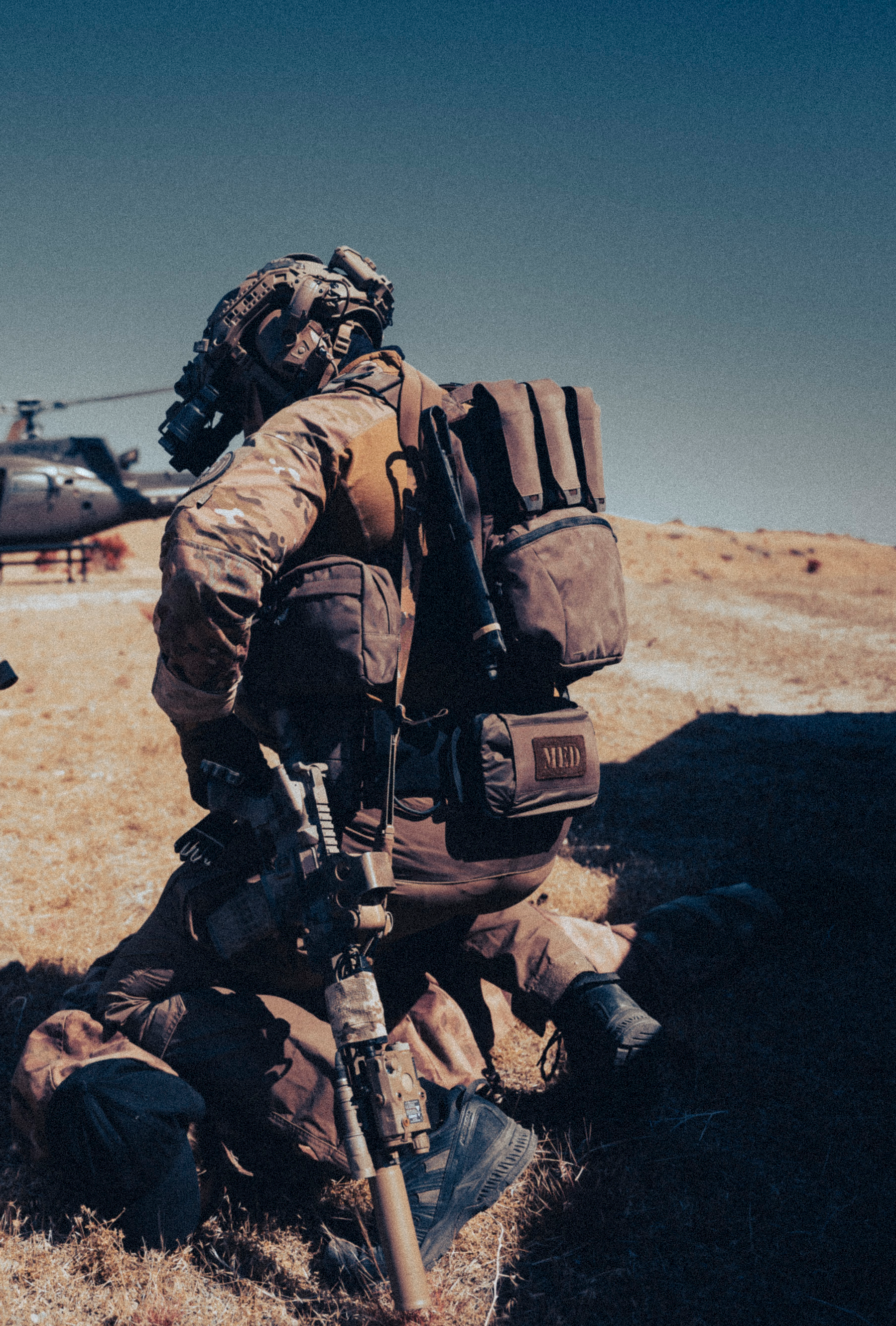
Direct Action gear

Direct Action is a Polish brand of military and tactical equipment established in 2014 and owned by Entire M. The brand designs and manufactures gear intended for military and law enforcement personnel, as well as sports shooting enthusiasts.

Since the brand's inception, the product design and development process has involved former special forces operators (including personnel from Poland's JW GROM) and industry specialists. Notable consultants include Brandon Webb, a former Navy SEAL and military author.

Direct Action regularly exhibits at international defense and tactical trade shows, including SHOT Show in the United States, Enforce Tac in Nuremberg, Eurosatory and Milipol in Paris, SOFINS in Bordeaux, Future Forces in Prague, and MSPO in Kielce.

Direct Action gear utilizes a laser-cut modular system compatible with MOLLE/PALS, designed to reduce weight compared to traditional webbing. The primary material used in production is Cordura laminate. The products are available in various color schemes.

- Current camouflage patterns: Multicam, Multicam Tropic.
- Discontinued patterns: PenCott family (Badlands, GreenZone), Flecktarn, US Woodland.
- Solid colors: Adaptive Green, Black, Coyote Brown, Ranger Green, and Shadow Grey.

==== Plate carriers ====
These modular vests feature a design compatible with the MOLLE/PALS. system, allowing for the attachment of additional panels and pouches. Key models include the SPITFIRE (along with its updated variant, the SPITFIRE MKII) and the BEARCAT. The product line also includes the HELLCAT and CORSAIR models, supported by various dedicated accessories and modules.

==== Chest rigs ====
These serve as a lightweight alternative to full tactical vests, designed to allow for mission-specific configuration and mobility. The lineup includes the THUNDERBOLT, HURRICANE, TEMPEST, TIGER MOTH, and TYPHOON. The CURTISS model is designed specifically for .308 caliber magazines.

==== Tactical belts and sleeves ====
The load-bearing systems consist of a main belt, an inner belt, and a modular sleeve designed to expand the mounting surface. These components are available with either hook or loop fastener options:

- Belts: Mustang Innerbelt, Warhawk Modular Rescue / Gun Belt, and the Warhawk Nautic Belt.
- Modular Sleeves: Firefly Low Vis, Tomcat, and Mosquito models.

==== Pouches ====
Modular pouches designed for ammunition magazines, grenades (fragmentation, smoke, and stun), and general utility equipment. They are compatible with the MOLLE/PALS mounting system.

==== Tactical accessories ====
The brand offers specialized pouches designed for radios, handcuffs, expandable batons, and medical supplies, as well as dump pouches and hydration bladders. The product range also includes Kydex holsters for sidearms and both single-point and two-point slings for long guns.

==== Holsters and slings ====
The offer includes Kydex holsters for sidearms, as well as single-point and two-point slings designed for long guns.

==== Backpacks and bags ====
The range includes models varying from combat to everyday use. The lineup features the Halifax Medium (a jump-capable backpack), the Halifax Small (a compact version), and the low-profile Dragonfly. Everyday carry backpacks include the Dragon Egg MKII, Dragon Egg Enlarged, Dust, and Ghost. Specialized equipment consists of the Mortar pack (designed to carry 10 mortar rounds), Messenger Bags, the Deployment Bag transport series (Small, Medium, Large), and the large Liberator Bag for equipment.

==== Apparel and accessories ====
The company offers a range of clothing and accessories, including T-shirts, caps, balaclavas, and gloves. The product line also includes patches divided into two categories: infrared (IR) identifiers (national flags, blood types, function tabs) and morale patches.

==== Custom service ====
This service is dedicated primarily to military and law enforcement units. It involves the design and manufacturing of equipment tailored to specific individual requirements, covering functionality, materials, and color schemes to match distinct operational needs.

== Manufacturing facilities in poland ==
Entire M operates three sewing facilities in Poland:

- Nowa Ruda – opened in 2014
- Nysa – launched in March 2023
- Świebodzice – inaugurated in June 2023

== Distribution ==
In addition to its own brands, the company distributes products from Morakniv, Wildo, Hultafors, Atwood Rope MFG and ALTA Industries in the Polish market.

== Cooperation with military units ==
=== Polish grom special forces unit ===
In 2018, the elite GROM military unit selected the Direct Action SPITFIRE Plate Carrier as part of its gear procurement process. The first batch was ordered in July, followed by another 100 sets in October. These included tactical belts with protective sleeves and a wide range of pouches and utility bags. The SPITFIRE plate carrier had already been introduced a year earlier as a new standard combat vest in the unit's inventory.

=== Polish special forces command (Jednostka Wojskowa Komandosów) ===
Direct Action gear is used by special forces around the world. In public procurement procedure 37/2024, organised by Unit 4101 (Jednostka Wojskowa Komandosów – JWK) in Lubliniec, Entire M Sp. z o.o. was selected as a supplier in two product categories:

- Task 5: Delivery of magnetic pouches (34 sets) – Direct Action Magnetic Shotgun Holder
- Task 6: Delivery of rope bags (50 sets) – Direct Action Rope Bag

== In popular culture ==
Direct Action gear has been featured in the NBC series The Brave, as well as in the films The Wages of Fear and Extraction (originally titled Tyler Rake).
