= Tadeusz Sapierzyński =

Polish Army officer (born 1958)

- Born: 1 April 1958 (age 68); Miastko, Poland
- Allegiance: Poland
- Branch: Polish Land Forces
- Rank: Pułkownik
- Commands: GROM
- Conflicts: Golan Heights, Yugoslavia, Bosnia

Colonel Tadeusz Sapierzyński (born 1 April 1958 in Miastko, Poland) is a Polish Army officer, former commander of the special forces unit "GROM", from 2004 until 2006.

A graduate of the "Tadeusz Kościuszko Land Forces Military Academy" in Wrocław and the "National Defence University in Warsaw. He served in command and staff positions in reconnaissance units, among others in the "4th Mechanized Division", in landing-assault units, among others he was commander of the "10th Landing-Assault Battalion" of the "6th Landing-Assault Brigade", and aeromobile units, among others he was chief of the staff of the "25th Air Cavalry Brigade".

He served as commander of Polish military contingents in the Golan Heights and two times in Bosnia and Herzegovina. He was commander of the "Nordic-Polish Battle Group" of SFOR in Bosnia. From 11 February 2004 to 23 February 2006 he was commander of the special forces unit "GROM".
