= Krzysztof Gliszczyński =

Polish painter

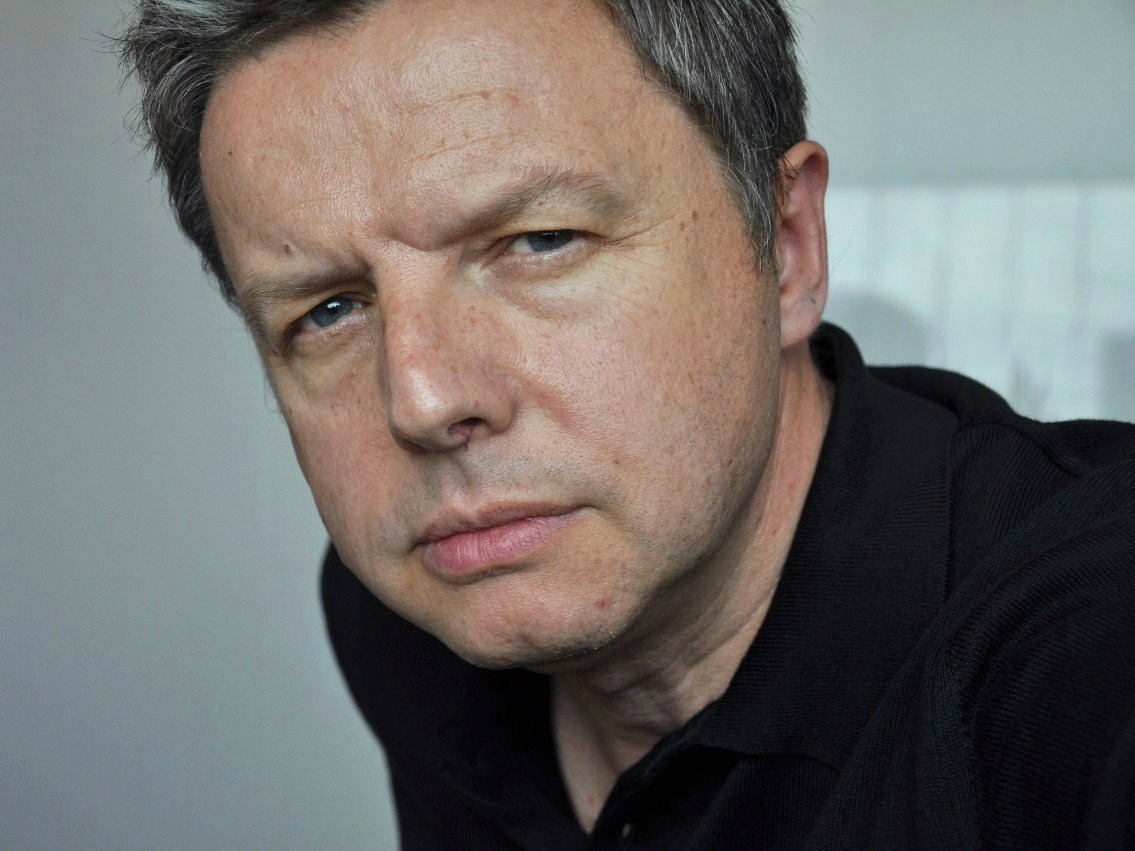
Professor Krzysztof Gliszczyński

Krzysztof Gliszczyński (born 16 January 1962 in Miastko, Poland) is a Polish painter from Sopot. He studied at the State College for Visual Arts (PWSSP) in Gdańsk between 1982–1987, and is now a professor in the department of painting at the Academy of Fine Arts there.

Gliszczyński attended State Grammar School for Visual Arts in Szczecin between 1977–1982. He studied at the Faculty of Painting and Prints of the State College for Visual Arts in Gdańsk at the graduate studio of Professor Kazimierz Ostrowski and received his degree there in 1987. He was a founder and curator of Galeria "Koło" in Gdańsk between 1995–2002.
