= Zdzisław Żurawski =

Polish Army officer

Colonel Zdzisław Żurawski (born November 23, 1954, in Bielawa) is a Polish Army officer.

Colonel Żurawski was commander of the special forces unit "GROM" (Thunder) from September 17, 1999, to May 26, 2000.
