= Roman Polko =

Polish army special forces officer

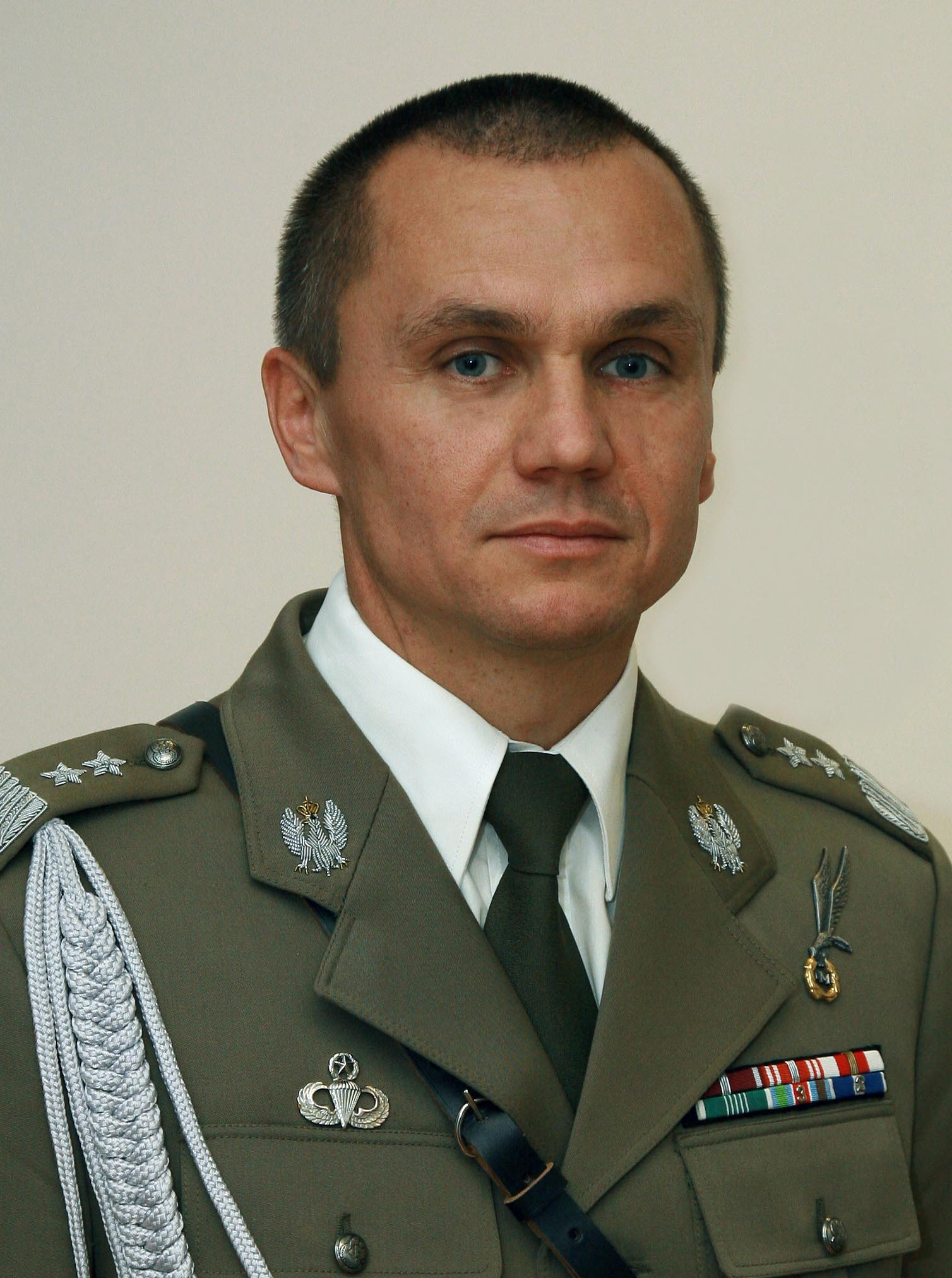
- Born: November 8, 1962 (age 63); Tychy, Poland
- Allegiance: Poland
- Branch: Polish Land Forces
- Rank: Major General (OF-7)
- Conflicts: Yugoslavia, Kosovo, Iraq

Roman Polko (born November 8, 1962, in Tychy, Poland) is a retired Polish army special forces officer, former acting chief of National Security Bureau, former commander of "JW GROM", doctor of military science studies, speciality: management.

Polko graduated from the Tadeusz Kosciuszko Land Forces Military Academy in Wrocław. He served in a reconnaissance unit in Dziwnów, then in the "1st Special Commando Regiment" in Lubliniec, as commander of commando groups. From 1992 until 1994 he took part in the UNPROFOR peace mission in former Yugoslavia.

In 1994, Polko began to study at the National Defence University in Warsaw, after that he served in the position of a senior operation officer in the "Czerwone Berety" (Red Berets) in Kraków. He also finished Ranger School and Pathfinder School in USA.

In 1999, Polko became popular commander of the 18th Bielski Air Assault Battalion of the 6th Airborne Brigade from Bielsko-Biała, which was a part of the Polish military contingent in the NATO KFOR forces in Kosovo. Polko was assigned as commander of the Polish contingent.

From May 26, 2000, until February 11, 2004, he was commander of the special forces unit "GROM". He commanded the GROM unit behind enemy lines in Iraq, during the Operation Iraqi Freedom. In 2006 Polko returned to active duty, on February 23 again became commander of GROM. Since March 2006 brigadier general. On September 7, 2006, Polko was nominated for the post of deputy chief of Biuro Bezpieczeństwa Narodowego (Bureau of National Security). In August 2007 he became acting chief of National Security Bureau, because previous chief was nominated for the post of minister of internal affairs. On August 15, 2007, Polko was promoted to major general.

He is an active sportsman, taking part in marathons, ski and parachute instructor (master class). At the 19th Pol'and'Rock Festival, he was invited to speak at the Academy of Fine Arts.

== Honours and decorations ==
Silver Cross of Merit
Armed Forces in Service for the Country Medal (Silver)
Medal for Merit for the Country Defense (Gold)
Commendation Medal (United States Army)
United Nations 'In The Service Of Peace' Medal – UNPROFOR
NATO Medal for Kosovo Service
Legion of Merit (United States)

== See also ==
- Polish Army
