= GROM Military Unit =

Polish special forces unit

GROM Military Unit (Operational Maneuver Response Group)
- Jednostka Wojskowa GROM
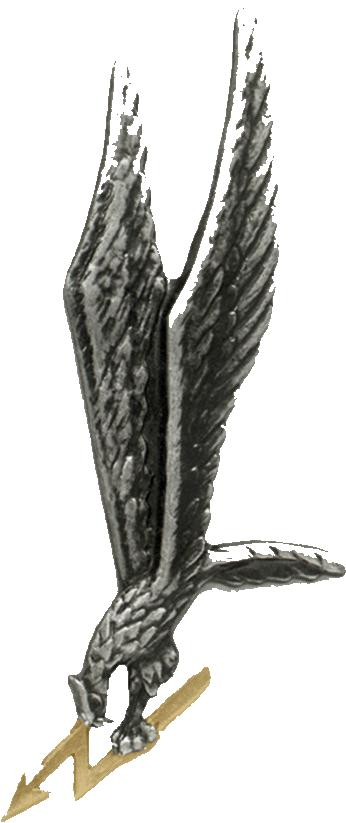
- Recon Badge
- Active: 13 July 1990 – present
- Country: Poland
- Branch: Special Troops Command
- Type: Special forces
- Role: Special operations Counter-terrorism
- Part of: Before October 1, 1999: Ministry of Interior; October 1, 1999 – present: Polish Armed Forces
- Garrison/HQ: Warsaw HQ, Gdańsk; Poland
- Nicknames: The unseen & silent; The Surgeons
- Patron: Cichociemni (Silent Unseen)
- Mottos: Siła i Honor! Tobie Ojczyzno! (Strength and Honor! For you, Fatherland!)
- Beret color: Grey
- Engagements: Operation Uphold Democracy; War on terror; • War in Afghanistan; • Iraq War; • War on ISIL
- Website: https://grom.wp.mil.pl/pl/ (in Polish)

Commanders
- Current commander: Colonel Grzegorz Gers (acting since March 30, 2023)
- Notable commanders: Sławomir Petelicki, Marian Sowiński, Roman Polko

GROM Military Unit (JW 2305) is a special forces unit of the Polish Armed Forces within the Polish Special Forces. The unit was officially formed on 13 July 1990 and honours the traditions of the World War II Silent Unseen paratroopers.

== History ==
=== Early history ===
GROM lit. "thunderbolt" (Polish: Grupa Reagowania Operacyjno-Manewrowego, translates to Operational Maneuver Response Group in English ) is a special operations unit of the Polish Armed Forces within the Polish Special Forces. The unit was officially formed on 13 July 1990.

By decision of the Minister of National Defence dated 4 August 1995 (Decision No. 119/MON), the unit assumed the heritage and continues the traditions of the World War II Silent Unseen paratroopers of the Home Army, adopting the corresponding honorific.

In the late 1980s, following security incidents affecting Polish diplomatic missions, a concept for a dedicated special-operations formation was developed within the Ministry of Interior. On 13 July 1990 the unit was formally established as Military Unit 2305 (JW 2305).

Col. Sławomir Petelicki served as the first commander and oversaw the unit’s initial formation. The early cadre was drawn from professional soldiers with prior special-operations experience. Among these were:

- 1 Batalion Szturmowy from Lubliniec (then known as 1 Pulk Specjalny Komandosów and now known as JW Komandosów)
- 48, 56 and 62 Kompania Specjalna
- 6 Brygada Desantowo-Szturmowa
- Polish Navy divers
- Anti-terrorist units of the Policja
- Mechanised Warfare Officer School in Wrocław
- Reconnaissance units of PAF

The unit has trained and operated alongside allied special-operations forces as part of Poland’s NATO commitments; details of training are not publicly disclosed.

During its first years JW 2305 remained non-public. The unit became widely known in 1994 following its participation in Operation Uphold Democracy in Haiti.

Initially subordinated to the Ministry of Interior, on 1 October 1999 the unit was transferred to the Ministry of National Defence and incorporated into the Polish Armed Forces. Today JW GROM forms part of the Polish Special Forces.

==== Balkans (1996–2001) ====
In the late 1990s and early 2000s, elements of JW GROM deployed to the Balkans as part of multinational efforts to detain indicted war crimes suspects and support stabilisation missions. On 27 June 1997, during Operation "Little Flower", a mixed team operating under the authority of the International Criminal Tribunal for the former Yugoslavia apprehended Slavko Dokmanović, the former mayor of Vukovar, who was under sealed indictment; he was subsequently transferred to The Hague.

=== War on terror ===
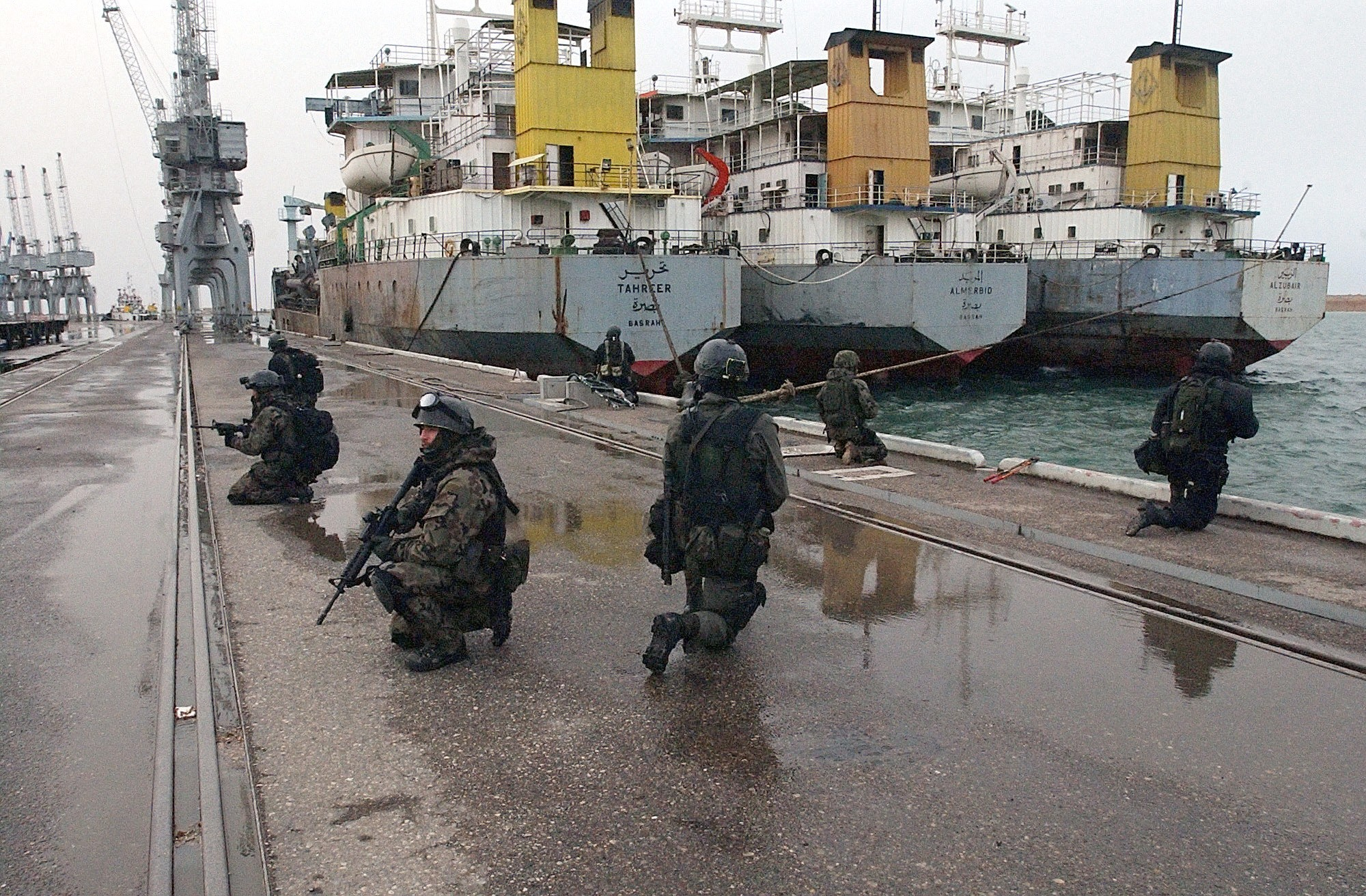
Polish GROM personnel secure a section of the port of Umm Qasr, Iraq during Operation Iraqi Freedom

==== Afghanistan (2002–2004) + Persian Gulf (2002–2003) ====
Following the 9/11 attacks, a GROM detachment deployed to Afghanistan; the unit’s official record lists operations across the country during 2002–2004 and again in 2007–2013, including the release of more than twenty hostages, force-protection in Bagram and VIP security tasks. In parallel, from 2002 to 2003 GROM teams took part in maritime interdiction operations in the Persian Gulf, boarding vessels as part of enforcement of the UN oil embargo on Iraq.

==== Iraq 2003: offshore oil terminals (KAAOT/ABOT) ====
For the 2003 invasion of Iraq, GROM formed part of the Naval Special Operations Task Group alongside U.S. Navy SEALs and SWCC. On 20 March 2003, SEAL and Polish special-forces platoons conducted simultaneous takedowns of the Khor al-Amaya (KAAOT) and Al Basrah (ABOT/MABOT) oil terminals, capturing more than 30 prisoners and securing critical infrastructure without firing a shot.

==== Iraq 2003: Mukarayin (Mukaysin) hydroelectric dam ====
In early April 2003, a mixed team of GROM operators and U.S. Navy SEALs secured the Mukarayin (Mukaysin) hydroelectric power plant and dam northeast of Baghdad to prevent its sabotage and flooding of key routes.

==== Iraq 2003–2004: post-invasion direct action ====
After the initial invasion phase, GROM remained in Iraq conducting special operations in Baghdad and central/northern Iraq, including raids to capture Saddam Hussein’s associates and members of al-Qaeda wanted by coalition partners.

==== Afghanistan (2007–2013): TF-49 ====
GROM returned to Afghanistan in 2007 as Task Force 49 under ISAF Special Operations Command, conducting direct-action missions and mentoring Afghan units. Operations included hostage-rescue missions (e.g., the 2013 release of MP Fariba Kakar), while the unit also sustained casualties in combat that year.

==== 2021 Kabul airlift ====
During the 2021 Kabul airlift, Polish special forces including GROM supported the evacuation via 44 flights; according to official government figures, more than 1,100 people were evacuated (including 937 Afghan partners), while international tallies put the figure at around 900 evacuees. Those airlifts also included staff of international organisations and allied governments.

== Training ==
US Navy SEALs and GROM naval warfare team practicing boarding skills near Gdańsk, Poland, 2009

Candidates for service in JW GROM undergo a multi-stage selection process that includes physical fitness tests, psychological assessment and a demanding field stage (commonly referred to in Polish sources as an "etap górski" or "truth test") designed to assess endurance, resilience and suitability for special-operations service.

GROM training covers a broad range of special-operations skills. According to official materials, operators receive instruction in counter-terrorism and direct-action techniques, airborne insertion (including military parachuting), combat diving and maritime operations, marksmanship and sniper techniques, as well as medical training and close-quarters battle. Units are organised and trained to operate in small teams in which members are cross-trained to cover key roles as required.

GROM conducts training with allied special-operations units and participates in multinational exercises. Official information indicates that the unit undertakes specialist maritime training and cooperates with partner navies for certain competencies; public accounts and unit publications further document exchanges with a range of NATO partners.

The unit’s internal training system is organised across several specialist streams and qualification phases covering land, maritime and urban/close-quarters tasks. Open-source accounts and public descriptions of GROM’s course structure commonly refer to tactical specialisations sometimes labelled informally as "green", "blue" and "black" streams (representing field, maritime and urban/hostage-rescue specialisations respectively), but the unit’s official publications describe the system more generally as multi-stage training with specialist follow-on courses.

== Organization ==
Details of JW GROM’s strength and internal organisation are classified. Open-source descriptions and official publications indicate that the unit is headquartered in Warsaw (Rembertów district), where the command, staff and most support elements are located.

The unit is structured into combat and support sub-units. These include:

- Combat Team A (Zespół Bojowy A) – a land operations element based in Warsaw,
- Combat Team B (Zespół Bojowy B) – a maritime element based in Gdańsk,
- Combat Team C (Zespół Bojowy C) – a third combat element based in Warsaw,
- logistic, intelligence, communications and security sections.

According to unit publications, the organisational model is broadly comparable to that of the British 22nd Special Air Service Regiment or the U.S. Army’s 1st Special Forces Operational Detachment–Delta, with small specialist teams rather than conventional platoons. The smallest operational element is typically a six-man section, grouped into teams and squadrons.

Operators are trained in at least two specialties, such as communications, demolitions, sniping, combat medicine, or breaching (Method of Entry). Support personnel include analysts, EOD specialists, electronic warfare and IT technicians. The unit also fields Joint Terminal Attack Controllers (JTACs), maintains a canine section (Belgian Malinois) and has access to rotary-wing aircraft including UH-60 Black Hawk helicopters.

== Known operations ==
Most of unit's operations remain classified, the known ones are listed below.

- 1990 – 1992 Operacja Most
- 1992 – "Antoni Macierewicz briefcases" affair (security duty during a feared political crisis in Poland).
- 1992 – Assault on residence and arrest of one of the bosses of Art B (a political and economic scandal in Poland).
- 1994 – Operation Uphold Democracy in Haiti.
- 1996 – UNTAES mission in eastern Slavonia, Croatia to arrest Slavko Dokmanović – they have since managed to arrest at least six more Serbian war-criminals.
- 1996 – Security duties during US ambassador W. G Walker's mission in Kosovo and Macedonia.
- 1999 – Security duties during US ambassador W.G Walker's mission in Kosovo and Macedonia.
- 2001 – Mission to apprehend individuals charged with war crimes in Kosovo.
- 2001 – Reconnaissance mission in Afghanistan before the arrival of Polish troops.
- 2002 – 2004 – Mission in Afghanistan (VIP security, base protection duties and other).
- 2002 – 2003 – Mission in Persian Gulf. Maritime Interdiction Operations.
- 2003 – 2004, 2007–2008 – GROM soldiers took part in Operation Iraqi Freedom. Boarding the KAAOT oil terminal in the port of Umm Kasr (Basra), capturing the Mukarayin dam, special operations, searching for and neutralizing Hussein's associates, members of the terrorist Al-Qaeda (from the American deck of cards).
- 2007 – 2021 – GROM was part of Special Forces in Afghanistan, as Task Force 49, operating in Ghazni Province.
- 2012 – Protection of Polish and International civilians during the Euro 2012 football tournament.
- 2021– Fall of Kabul. The task of the Polish soldiers was to help evacuate people from the country controlled by the Taliban.
- 2022 – Protection of Polish President Andrzej Duda during his visit to Ukraine amidst the Russian invasion.

== Equipment ==
=== Handguns ===
- IMI Desert Eagle Mark XIX – likely used only in a training capacity
- FN Five-seveN – a few units
- Glock 17 & 17T
- Heckler & Koch Mark 23 – a few units
- Heckler & Koch USP
- SIG P226 & P228
- Colt-1911 – a few units, captured after Haiti-mission

=== Automatic Rifles ===
- Bushmaster M4A3 assault rifle (often with M203 grenade launcher) – withdrawn from use, replaced by Heckler & Koch HK416
- Bushmaster XM15E2S
- FN F2000 Tactical – a few units
- Heckler & Koch G36 assault rifles in various versions – a few units
- Heckler & Koch HK416 D10RS and D145RS
- KAC SR-16 (an AR-15 type rifle) – withdrawn from use, replaced by Heckler & Koch HK416
- Colt M4A1 assault rifle (with RIS) – withdrawn from use, replaced by Heckler & Koch HK416
- SIG SG 551 – a few units
- Steyr AUG – a few units

=== Submachine guns/personal defense weapons ===
- Heckler & Koch MP5 submachine gun
- FN P90 TR – a few units

=== Machine guns ===
- FN Minimi Para & TR
- Manroy M2 QCB

=== Precision rifles ===
- Accuracy International AWM-F sniper rifle .338 LM round
- CheyTac Intervention - a few units (.408 Cheyenne Tactical chambering) heavy sniper rifle
- Heckler & Koch PSG1
- KAC SR-25 marksman rifle withdrawn from use, replaced by LaRue Tactical OBR 7.62
- LaRue Tactical OBR 7.62 marksman rifle
- PGM Mini Hécate II .338 Lapua Magnum sniper rifle
- PGM Hécate II
- Sako TRG-22 sniper rifle

=== Launchers/anti-material weapons ===
- Barrett M107 anti-matériel sniper rifle
- Saab Bofors Dynamics Carl Gustav M3 MAAWS
- Saab Bofors Dynamics AT4
- Zeveta RPG-75
- LRM vz. 99 ANTOS - a Czech-made 60mm mortar
- Rafael Spike
- Raytheon-Lockheed Martin Javelin

=== Uniforms and gear ===
GROM employs a variety of uniforms and modular tactical equipment; exact issue details remain classified. In 2018 the unit awarded a contract to Polish manufacturer Direct Action (owned by Entire M) for 100 Spitfire plate carriers (ballistic plate carriers). Later coverage noted that GROM selected the Spitfire as its primary plate carrier. Direct Action originated within the Helikon-Tex (currently Entire M) group and evolved into an independent brand backed by Helikon-Tex’s manufacturing experience, which specializes in tactical/outdoor apparel.

== Commanders ==
- Brigadier General Sławomir Petelicki (June 13, 1990 – December 19, 1995)
- Brigadier General Marian Sowiński (December 19, 1995 – December 6, 1997)
- Brigadier General Sławomir Petelicki (December 7, 1997 – September 17, 1999)
- Colonel Zdzisław Żurawski (September 17, 1999 – May 26, 2000)
- Colonel Roman Polko (May 26, 2000 – February 11, 2004)
- Colonel Tadeusz Sapierzyński (February 11, 2004 – February 23, 2006)
- Brigadier General Roman Polko (February 23, 2006 – November 8, 2006)
- Colonel Piotr Patalong (November 8, 2006 – March 25, 2008)
- Colonel Jerzy Gut (March 25, 2008 – July 24, 2008)
- Colonel Dariusz Zawadka (July 24, 2008 – August 6, 2010)
- Colonel Jerzy Gut (August 6, 2010 – July 28, 2011)
- Colonel Piotr Gąstał (July 28, 2011 – September 7, 2016)
- Colonel Robert Kopacki (September 8, 2016 – March 14, 2017)
- Colonel Mariusz Pawluk (March 14, 2017 – December 31, 2019)
- Colonel Grzegorz Mikłusiak (January 1, 2020 – March 30, 2023)
- Colonel Grzegorz Gers (March 30, 2023 – April 1, 2026)
- Colonel Krzysztof Mila (acting since April 1, 2026)

== See also ==
- Silent Unseen
