= List of windmills in South Holland =

List of Dutch windmills

A list of windmills in the Dutch province of South Holland.

Location	Name of mill	Type	Built	Noteszelden	Photograph
Aarlanderveen	De Morgenster	Stellingmolen	1870	Molendatabase (in Dutch)	
Aarlanderveen	Molen Nummer 1	Grondzeiler	1924	Molendatabase (in Dutch)	
Aarlanderveen	Molen Nummer 2	Grondzeiler	1869	Molendatabase (in Dutch)	
Aarlanderveen	Molen Nummer 3	Grondzeiler	1823	Molendatabase (in Dutch)	
Aarlanderveen	Molen Nummer 4 De Putmolen	Grondzeiler	1801	Molendatabase (in Dutch)	
Abbenbroek	De Hoop	Grondzeiler	1843	Molendatabase (in Dutch)	
Achthuizen	Windlust	Stellingmolen	1852	Molendatabase (in Dutch)	
Alblasserdam	Kortlandse Molen	Grondzeiler	1890	Molendatabase (in Dutch)	
Alblasserdam	De Blokweerse Molen	Wipmolen		Molendatabase (in Dutch)	
Alphen aan den Rijn	De Eendracht	Stellingmolen	1898	Molendatabase (in Dutch)	
Alphen aan den Rijn	Vrouwgeestmolen	Grondzeiler	1797	Molendatabase (in Dutch)	
Arkel	Jan van Arkel	Stellingmolen	1852	Molendatabase (in Dutch)	
Barendrecht	Pendrechtse Molen	Grondzeiler	1731	Molendatabase (in Dutch)	
Benthuizen	De Haas	Stellingmolen	1772	Molendatabase (in Dutch)	
Bergambacht	Den Arend	Stellingmolen	1869	Molendatabase (in Dutch)	
Berkel en Rodenrijs	De Valk	Grondzeiler	1772	Molendatabase (in Dutch)	
Blesksensgraaf	Tjasker Blesksensgraaf	Tjasker	1987	Molendatabase (in Dutch)	
Blesksensgraaf	Hofwegensemolen	Wipmolen		Molendatabase (in Dutch)	
Blesksensgraaf	Wingerdse Molen	Wipmolen	c. 1513	Molendatabase (in Dutch)	
Bodegraven	De Arkduif	Stellingmolen	1697	Molendatabase (in Dutch)	
Brielle	't Vliegende Hert	Standerdmolen	1985	Molendatabase (in Dutch)	
Delft	De Roos	Stellingmolen	c. 1727	Molendatabase (in Dutch)	
Delft	Standerdmolen	Standerdmolen	1551	Demolished by 1603; Molendatabase (in Dutch)	
Delft	Slikmolen	Standerdmolen	1603	Demolished by 1696. Molendatabase (in Dutch)	
Delft	Slikmolen; Molen van Rossum; Het Fortuyn	Stellingmolen	1696	Dismantled 1917, re-erected at the Netherlands Open Air Museum in 1920. Molendatabase (in Dutch)	
Den Bommel	De Bommelaer	Grondzeiler	1735	Molendatabase (in Dutch)	
Dirksland	De Eendracht	Stellingmolen	1846	Molendatabase (in Dutch)	
Dordrecht	Kijk Over Den Dyck	Stellingmolen	1713	Molendatabase (in Dutch)	
Geervliet	De Bernisse Molen	Stellingmolen	1851	Molendatabase (in Dutch)	
Giessendam	De Tiendwegse Molen	Wipmolen	1906	Molendatabase (in Dutch)	
Goedereede	Windvang	Grondzeiler	1791	Molendatabase (in Dutch)	
Gorinchem	De Hoop	Stellingmolen	1764	Molendatabase (in Dutch)	
Gorinchem	Nooit Volmaakt	Stellingmolen	1718	Molendatabase (in Dutch)	
Gorinchem	Oostmolen	Wipmolen	1817	Molendatabase (in Dutch)	
Gorinchem	Westmolen	Wipmolen	1814	Molendatabase (in Dutch)	
Gouda	't Slot	Stellingmolen	1832	Molendatabase (in Dutch)	
Gouda	De Roode Leeuw	Stellingmollen	1727	Molendatabase (in Dutch)	
Gouda	Haastrechtse Molen	Stellingmolen	1862	Molendatabase (in Dutch)	
Goudriaan	Goudriaanse Molen	Grondzeiler	1779	Molendatabase (in Dutch)	
Goudswaard	Windlust	Grondzeiler	c. 1694	Molendatabase (in Dutch)	
Groot Ammers	Achterlandse Molen	Wipmolen	c. 1596	Molendatabase (in Dutch)	
Groot Ammers	De Achtkante Molen	Grondzeiler	1805	Molendatabase (in Dutch)	
Groot Ammers	De Graaflandse Molen	Wipmolen	c. 1596	Molendatabase (in Dutch)	
Groot Ammers	Gelkense Molen	Wipmolen	c. 1596	Molendatabase (in Dutch)	
Groot Ammers	De Jonge Sofia	Grondzeiler	2003	Molendatabase (in Dutch)	
Hazerswoude-Dorp	Gere Molen; Blauwe Wip	Wipmolen	1636	Molendatabase (in Dutch)	
Hazerswoude-Dorp	Nieuw Leven; De Zwaluw	Stellingmolen	1816	Molendatabase (in Dutch)	
Hazerswoude-Dorp	Rietveldse Molen	Grondzeiler	1648	Molendatabase (in Dutch)	
Hazerswoude-Dorp	Rooie Wuip	Wipmolen	1639	Molendatabase (in Dutch)	
Hazerswoude-Rijndijk	Groenendijkse Molen	Wipmolen	1627	Molendatabase (in Dutch)	
Hazerswoude-Rijndijk	De Rijnenburger	Stellingmolen	1722	Molendatabase (in Dutch)	
Hellevoetsluis	De Hoop	Stellingmolen	1801	Molendatabase (in Dutch)	
Herkingen	De Dankbaarheid	Grondzeiler	1841	Molendatabase (in Dutch)	
Hoogmade	Grosmolen	Wipmolen	1640	Molendatabase (in Dutch)	
Hoogmade	Doesmolen	Wipmolen	c. 1630	Molendatabase (in Dutch)	
Hoogmade	Hoogmadese Molen; De Heerlijkheid	Wipmolen	1897	Molendatabase (in Dutch)	
Hoogmade	Vlietmolen	Wipmolen	1913	Molendatabase (in Dutch)	
Hook of Holland	De Nieuwlandse Molen	Stellingmolen	1584	Molendatabase (in Dutch)	
Hoornaar	Oudendijkse Molen	Wipmolen	1996	Molendatabase (in Dutch)	
Hoornaar	Scheiwijkse Molen	Wipmolen	1638	Molendatabase (in Dutch)	
Kaag	De Kager	Wipmolen	c. 1683	Molendatabase (in Dutch)	
Katwijk	De Geregtigheid	Stellingmolen	1740	Molendatabase (in Dutch)	
Kinderdijk	Nederwaard Molen Nummer 1	Grondzeiler	1738	Molendatabase (in Dutch)	
Kinderdijk	Nederwaard Molen Nummer 2	Grondzeiler	1738	Molendatabase (in Dutch)	
Kinderdijk	Nederwaard Molen Nummer 3	Grondzeiler	1738	Molendatabase (in Dutch)	
Kinderdijk	Nederwaard Molen Nummer 4	Grondzeiler	1738	Molendatabase (in Dutch)	
Kinderdijk	Nederwaard Molen Nummer 5	Grondzeiler	1738	Molendatabase (in Dutch)	
Kinderdijk	Nederwaard Molen Nummer 6	Grondzeiler	1738	Molendatabase (in Dutch)	
Kinderdijk	Nederwaard Molen Nummer 7	Grondzeiler	1738	Molendatabase (in Dutch)	
Kinderdijk	Nederwaard Molen Nummer 8	Grondzeiler	1738	Molendatabase (in Dutch)	
Kinderdijk	Overwaard Molen Nummer 1	Grondzeiler	1740	Molendatabase (in Dutch)	
Kinderdijk	Overwaard Molen Nummer 2	Grondzeiler	1740	Molendatabase (in Dutch)	
Kinderdijk	Overwaard Molen Nummer 3	Grondzeiler	1740	Molendatabase (in Dutch)	
Kinderdijk	Overwaard Molen Nummer 4	Grondzeiler	1740	Molendatabase (in Dutch)	
Kinderdijk	Overwaard Molen Nummer 5	Grondzeiler	1740	Molendatabase (in Dutch)	
Kinderdijk	Overwaard Molen Nummer 6	Grondzeiler	1740	Molendatabase (in Dutch)	
Kinderdijk	Overwaard Molen Nummer 7	Grondzeiler	1740	Molendatabase (in Dutch)	
Kinderdijk	Overwaard Molen Nummer 8	Grondzeiler	1740	Molendatabase (in Dutch)	
Koudekerk aan den Rijn	Hondsdikse Molen	Grondzeiler	1693	Molendatabase (in Dutch)	
Koudekerke aan den Rijn	Lagenwaardse Molen	Wipmolen	1634	Molendatabase (in Dutch)	
Krimpen aan den IJssel	Onverwacht; Schelvenaer	Stellingmolen	1993	Molendatabase (in Dutch)	
Langerak	De Westmolen	Wipmolen	1652	Molendatabase (in Dutch)	
Leiden	De Heesterboom	Stellingmolen	1804	Molendatabase (in Dutch)	
Leiden	De Herder	Stellingmolen	1884	Molendatabase (in Dutch)	
Leiden	De Put	Standerdmolen	1987	Molendatabase (in Dutch)	
Leiden	De Valk	Stellingmolen	1743	Molendatabase (in Dutch)	
Leiden	Kikkermolen	Wipmolen	1752	Molendatabase (in Dutch)	
Leiden	Maredijkmolen	Wipmolen	1735	Molendatabase (in Dutch)	
Leiden	Rodenburgermolen	Grondzeiler	1893	Molendatabase (in Dutch)	
Leiden	Stadsmolen	Grondzeiler	1856	Molendatabase (in Dutch)	
Leiden-Stevenshof	Stevenshofjesmolen	Grondzeiler	1797	Molendatabase (in Dutch)	
Leiderdorp	Achthovense Molen	Wipmolen	1893	Molendatabase (in Dutch)	
Leiderdorp	Kalkmolen	Wipmolen	1684	Molendatabase (in Dutch)	
Leiderdorp	Doeshofmolen	Grondzeiler	1830	Molendatabase (in Dutch)	
Leiderdorp	Munnikermolen	Wipmolen	1890	Molendatabase (in Dutch)	
Leiderdorp	Zijllaanmolen	Grondzeiler	1850	Molendatabase (in Dutch)	
Leidschendam	De Salamander	Stellingmolen	1792	Molendatabase (in Dutch)	
Leidschendam	Bovenmolen	Grondzeiler	1672	Molendatabase (in Dutch)	
Leidschendam	Middenmolen	Grondzeier	1672	Molendatabase (in Dutch)	
Leidschendam	Ondermolen	Grondzeiler	1903	Molendatabase (in Dutch)	
Lisse	Keukenhofmolen	Stellingmolen	1957	Molendatabase (in Dutch)	
Lisse	Lageveensemolen	Wipmolen	1890	Molendatabase (in Dutch)	
Lisse	Lisserpoelmolen	Grondzeiler	1676	Molendatabase (in Dutch)	
Lisse	Zemelmolen	Grondzeiler	2003	Molendatabase (in Dutch)	
Loosduinen	De Korenaar; Prins Maurits	Stellingmolen	1721	Molendatabase (in Dutch)	
Maasdam	De Hoop	Stellingmolen	1822	Molendatabase (in Dutch)	
Maasdam	Sint Anthonymolen; Polderse Molen	Grondzeiler	1749	Molendatabase (in Dutch)	
Maasland	De Drie Lelies	Grondzeiler	1767	Molendatabase (in Dutch)	
Maasland	Dijkmolen	Grondzeiler	1718	Molendatabase (in Dutch)	
Maassluis	De Hoop	Stellingmolen		Molendatabase (in Dutch)	
Maassluis	De Wippersmolen	Grondzeiler	1726	Molendatabase (in Dutch)	
Meerkerk-Den Dool	Stijve Molen	Wipmolen	1665	Molendatabase (in Dutch)	
Mijnsheerenland	De Goede Hoop	Grondzeiler	1749	Molendatabase (in Dutch)	
Mijnsheerenland	Oostmolen	Wipmolen	1731	Molendatabase (in Dutch)	
Moerkapelle	Moerkapelle Windmill	Stellingmolen		Molendatabase (in Dutch)	
Molenaarsgraaf	De Kerkmolen	Grondzeiler	1844	Molendatabase (in Dutch)	
Molenaarsgraaf	De Middelmolen	Wipmolen		Molendatabase (in Dutch)	
Monster	De Vier Winden	Stellingmolen	1882	Molendatabase (in Dutch)	
Moordrecht	Zuidplaasmolen I	Achtkantmolen	1838	Moved to Zuidwolde, Drenthe in 1878. Molendatabase (in Dutch); De Hollandsche Molen (in Dutch)	
Nieuw-Beijerland	De Swaen; Windlust	Grondzeiler	1703	Molendatabase (in Dutch)	
Nieuw-Lekkerland	De Hoge Molen	Grondzeiler	1740	Molendatabase (in Dutch)	
Nieuwe-Tonge	D'Oranjeboom	Grondzeiler	1768	Molendatabase (in Dutch)	
Nieuwenhoorn	Zeezicht	Grondzeiler	1718	Molendatabase (in Dutch)	
Nieuwerbrug	Weipoortse Molen	Grondzeiler	1674	Molendatabase (in Dutch)	
Nieuwerkerk aan den IJssel	Windlust	Stellingmolen	1776	Molendatabase (in Dutch)	
Noordeloos	Boterslootse Molen	Wipmolen	1837	Molendatabase (in Dutch)	
Noordwijk	Hogewegse Molen	Wipmolen	1652	Molendatabase (in Dutch)	
Noordwijkerhout	Hogeveensemolen	Grondzeiler	1654	Molendatabase (in Dutch)	
Nootdorp	Windlust	Stellingmolen	1885	Molendatabase (in Dutch)	
Oegstgeest	Oudenhofmolen	Wipmolen	1783	Molendatabase (in Dutch)	
Oostvoorne	Oostvoorne Windmill	Grondzeiler	1821	Molendatabase (in Dutch)	
Oud-Ade	Rode Molen	Wipmolen	1632	Molendatabase (in Dutch)	
Oud-Ade	Vrouw Vennemolen	Wipmolen	1835	Molendatabase (in Dutch)	
Oud-Ade	Akkersslootmolen	Grondzeiler	1793	Molendatabase (in Dutch)	
Oud-Alblas	De Hoop	Stellingmolen	1843	Molendatabase (in Dutch)	
Oud Alblas	De Peilmolen	Groundzeiler	1818	Molendatabase (in Dutch)	
Oud Alblas	Kooijwijkse Molen	Grondzeiler	1866	Molendatabase (in Dutch)	
Ouddorp	De Hoop	Stellingmolen	1845	Molendatabase (in Dutch)	
Ouddorp	De Zwaan	Stellingmolen	1846	Molendatabase (in Dutch)	
Oude-Tonge	De Korenbloem	Grondzeiler	1748	Molendatabase (in Dutch)	
Oukoop	Oukoopse Molen	Wipmolen		Molendatabase (in Dutch)	
Piershil	Simonia	Grondzeiler	1845	Molendatabase (in Dutch)	
Puttershoek	De Lelie	Grondzeiler	1836	Molendatabase (in Dutch)	
Rijnsaterwoude	De Geestmolen	Grondzeiler	1707	Molendatabase (in Dutch)	
Rijnsaterwoude	Dekkermolen	Kleine molen	1975	Molendatabase (in Dutch)	
Rijpwetering	Adermolen	Grondzeiler	1941	Molendatabase (in Dutch)	
Rijpwetering	Blauwe Molen	Grondzeiler	1904	Molendatabase (in Dutch)	
Rijpwetering	Buurtermolen	Wipmolen	18th century	Molendatabase (in Dutch)	
Rijpwetering	Lijkermolen Nummer 1	Grondzeiler	1780	Molendatabase (in Dutch)	
Rijpwetering	Lijkermolen Nummer 2	tower mill	1780	Molendatabase (in Dutch)	
Rijpwetering	Moppermolen	Grondzeiler	1752	Molendatabase (in Dutch)	
Rijpwetering	Waterloosmolen	Grondzeiler	1857	Molendatabase (in Dutch)	
Rijsoord	De Kersenboom	Grondzeiler	1822	Molendatabase (in Dutch)	
Rijswijk	De Schaapweimolen	Grondzeiler	1825	Molendatabase (in Dutch)	
Rockanje	Rockanje Windmill	Grondzeiler	1718	Molendatabase (in Dutch)	
Roelofarendsveen	Googermolen	Grondzeiler	1717	Molendatabase (in Dutch)	
Roelofarendsveen	Veendermolen	Grondzeiler	1934	Molendatabase (in Dutch)	
Rotterdam-Charlois	De Zandweg	Stellingmolen	1723	Molendatabase (in Dutch)	
Rotterdam-Delfshaven	De Distilleerketel	Stellingmolen	1986	Molendatabase (in Dutch)	
Rotterdam-Hillegersbeeg	De Prinsenmolen	Grondzeiler	1648	Molendatabase (in Dutch)	
Rotterdam-Kralingen	De Lelie	Stellingmolen	1840	Molendatabase (in Dutch)	
Rotterdam-Kralingen	De Ster	Stellingmolen	1969	Molendatabase (in Dutch)	
Rotterdam-Overschie	De Speelman	Stellingmolen	1971	Molendatabase (in Dutch)	
Rotterdam-Terbregge	De Vier Winden	Stellingmolen	1776	Molendatabase (in Dutch)	
Rozenburg	De Hoop	Stellingmolen	1887	Molendatabase (in Dutch)	
Schiedam	Babbersmolen	Stellingmolen	1710	Molendatabase	
Schiedam	De Drie Korenblomen	Stellingmolen	1770	Molendatabase (in Dutch)	
Schiedam	De Kameel	Stellingmolen	2010	Molendatabase	
Schiedam	De Nieuwe Palmboom	Stellingmolen	1992	Molendatabase (in Dutch)	
Schiedam	De Noord	Stellingmolen	1803	Molendatabase (in Dutch)	
Schiedam	De Vrijheid	Stellingmolen	1785	Molendatabase (in Dutch)	
Schiedam	De Walvisch	Stellingmolen	1794	Molendatabase (in Dutch)	
Schiedam	Noletmolen	Stellingmolen	2005	Molendatabase (in Dutch)	
Schiedam	De Kameel	Stellingmolen	2010	Molendatabase (in Dutch)	
Schipluiden	De Korpershoek	Grondzeiler	1950	Molendatabase (in Dutch)	
Schipluiden	Groeneveldse Molen	Grondzeiler	1717	Molendatabase (in Dutch)	
's-Gravendeel	Het Vliegende Hert	Stellingmolen	1858	Molendatabase (in Dutch)	
's-Gravenzande	Molen van Maat	Stellingmollen	1908	Molendatabase (in Dutch)	
Sommelsdijk	De Korenbloem	Stellingmolen	1705	Molendatabase (in Dutch)	
Spijkenisse	Nooitgedacht	Stellingmollen	1844	Molendatabase (in Dutch)	
Stad aan 't Haringvliet	De Korenaar	Grondzeiler	1746	Molendatabase (in Dutch)	
Stellendam	Korenlust	Stellingmolen	1856	Molendatabase (in Dutch)	
Streefkerk	Broekmolen	Wipmolen	1581	Molendatabase (in Dutch)	
Streefkerk	De Achtkante Molen	Grondzeiler	c. 1681	Molendatabase (in Dutch)	
Streefkerk	De Liefde; In Liefde Draaiende	Stellingmolllen	1893	Molendatabase (in Dutch)	
Streefkerk	Klein Molen; Tiendweg Molen	Wipmolen		Molendatabase (in Dutch)	
Streefkerk	Oude Weteringmolen	Wipmolen	c. 1751	Molendatabase (in Dutch)	
The Hague	Laakmolen; Galgemolen	Grondzeiler	1699	Molendatabase (in Dutch)	
The Hague	Nieuwe Veenmolen; Boschmolen	Grondzeiler	1654	Molendatabase (in Dutch)	
Vlaardingen	Aeolus	Stellingmolen	1790	Molendatabase (in Dutch)	
Vlist	Bonrepasmolen	Wipmolen	c. 1600	Molendatabase (in Dutch)	
Vlist	De Bachtenaar	Wipmolen	1712	Molendatabase (in Dutch)	
Voorburg	De Vlieger	Grondzeiler	1621	Molendatabase (in Dutch)	
Voorhout	Hoop Doet Leven	Grondzeiler	1783	Molendatabase (in Dutch)	
Voorschoten	Knipmolen	Grondzeiler	c. 1800	Molendatabase (in Dutch)	
Warmond	Boterhuismolen	Grondzeiler	1744	Molendatabase (in Dutch)	
Warmond	Broekdijkmolen	Grondzeiler	1976	Molendatabase (in Dutch)	
Warmond	De Kok	Grondzeiler	1809	Molendatabase (in Dutch)	
Warmond	Faljermolen	Kleine Molen	1935	Molendatabase (in Dutch)	
Warmond	Lakermolen	Grondzeiler	1821	Molendatabase (in Dutch)	
Warmond	Nieuwe Hofmolen	Wipmolen	1981	Molendatabase (in Dutch)	
Warmond	Zwanburgermolen	Grondzeiler	1805	Molendatabase (in Dutch)	
Warmond	Zweilandermolen	Wipmolen	1632	Molendatabase (in Dutch)	
Warmond	't Poeltje	Grondzeiler	1787	Molendatabase (in Dutch)	
Wassenaar	Windlust	Stellingmolen	c. 1700	Molendatabase (in Dutch)	
Wassenaar	Zuidwijksemolen	Grondzeiler	c. 1811	Molendatabase (in Dutch)	
Wateringen	Windlust	Stellingmolen	1869	Molendatabase (in Dutch)	
Westmaas	Windlust	Stellingmolen	1864	Molendatabase (in Dutch)	
Woerdense Verlaat	Westveense Molen	Wipmolen	1676	Molendatabase (in Dutch)	
Zevenhuizen	Eendrachtsmolen	Grondzeiler	1727	Molendatabase (in Dutch)	
Zevenhuizen	Tweemanspolder Nummer 1	Grondzeiler	1730	Molendatabase (in Dutch)	
Zevenhuizen	Tweemanspolder Nummer 2	Grondzeiler	1729	Molendatabase (in Dutch)	
Zevenhuizen	Tweemanspolder Nummer 3	Grondzeiler	1792	Molendatabase (in Dutch)	
Zevenhuizen	Tweemanspolder Nummer 4	Grondzeiler	1722	Molendatabase (in Dutch)	
Zoetermeer	De Hoop	Stellingmolen	1897	Molendatabase (in Dutch)	
Zoeterwoude-Dorp	Zelden Van Passe; De Westeinder	Grondzeiller	1642	Molendatabase (in Dutch)	
Zoeterwoude-Rijndijk	Barremolen	Grondzeiler	1661	Molendatabase (in Dutch)	
Zoeterwoude-Rijndijk	Grote Molen	Wipmolen	1626	Molendatabase (in Dutch)	
Zoetermeer-Rijndijk	Meerburgermolen	Grondzeiler	1684	Molendatabase (in Dutch)	
Zuid-Beijerland	Landzigt	Grondzeiler	1857	Molendatabase (in Dutch)	
Zuidbroek	Zuidbroeksemolen	Iron Windpump	1922	Molendatabase (in Dutch)	
Zuidland	De Arend	Stellingmolen	1844	Molendatabase (in Dutch)	
Zwammerdam	De Dikke Molen	Grondzeiler	1674	Molendatabase (in Dutch)	
Zwammerdam	Steektermolen	Wipmolen	c. 1597	Molendatabase (in Dutch)	
