= Windlust =

Windlust (meaning a love of wind) is a name given to some windmills in the Netherlands. Mills named Windlust include:-

- Windlust, Achthuizen, a tower mill in Achthuizen, South Holland
- Windlust, Brouwershaven, a smock mill in Zeeland
- Windlust, Burum, a smock mill in Burum, Friesland
- De Windlust, Burdaard, a smock mill in Burdaard, Friesland
- Windlust, Goudswaard, a tower mill in South Holland
- Windlust, Hoek, a tower mill in Zeeland
- Windlust, Nederweert, a tower mill in Limburg
- Windlust, Nieuw-Beijerland, a tower mill in South Holland
- Windlust, Nieuwerkerk aan de IJssel, a tower mill in South Holland
- Windlust, Nistelrode, a post mill in North Brabant
- Windlust, Noordwolde, a smock mill in Noordwolde, Friesland
- Windlust, Nootdorp, a smock mill in South Holland
- Windlust, Overschild, a smock mill in Groningen
- Windlust, Radewijk, a tower mill in Overijssel
- Windlust, Vorstenbosch, a tower post mill in North Brabant
- Windlust, Wassenaar, a tower mill in South Holland
- Windlust, Wateringen, a tower mill in South Holland
- Windlust, Westmaas, a tower mill in South Holland
- Windlust, Wolvega, a smock mill in Friesland
- Windlust, Zandeweer, a smock mill in Groningen
