= Eendracht (disambiguation) =

Eendracht (the Dutch word for "unity") is a canal and former branch of the river Scheldt in the Netherlands.

Eendracht or De Eendracht may also refer to:

== Ships ==
- Eendracht, first ship to round Cape Horn into the Pacific Ocean, in the 1616 voyage led by Jacob Le Maire and Willem Schouten
- Eendracht (1615 ship), ship with which Dirk Hartog made the second recorded European landing in Australia
- Eendracht (1655 ship), flagship of United Provinces confederate navy
- Eendracht (1989 ship), Dutch ship built in 1989
- Eendracht class cruiser, a class of light cruisers

== Windmills ==
- De Eendracht, Alkmaar, North Holland
- De Eendracht, Alphen aan den Rijn, South Holland
- De Eendracht, Anjum, Friesland
- De Eendracht, Dirksland, South Holland
- De Eendracht, Gieterveen, Drenthe
- De Eendracht, Kimswerd, Friesland
- De Eendracht, Sebaldeburen, Groningen
- De Eendracht, three windmills in Leeuwarden

== Other uses ==
- De Eendracht, Amsterdam, a neighborhood of Amsterdam, Netherlands
- General Industrial Union of Textiles and Clothing, Dutch trade union also known as "De Eendracht"
- Eendracht Aalst, a Belgian football club
- Eendrachtsland, one of the earliest names given to the country now known as Australia

== See also ==
- Eendracht maakt macht (Unity makes strength), national motto of the Dutch Republic
- List of windmills in the Netherlands
