= Dorpskerk, Ouddorp =

Church in Ouddorp, Netherlands

Dorpskerk
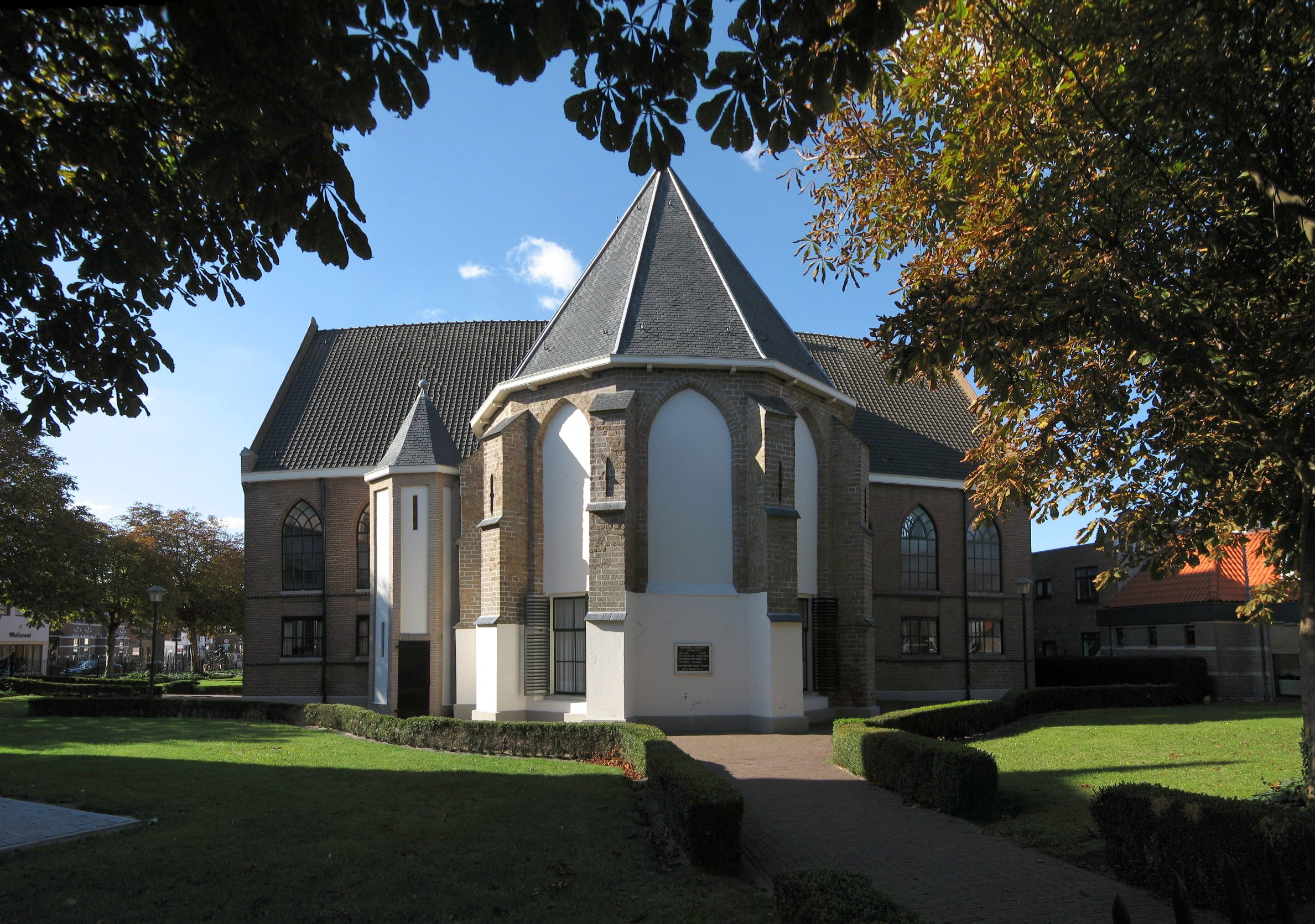
- The church in 2009

Religion
- Affiliation: Protestant, Restored Reformed Church
- Leadership: ds. D. Zoet

Location
- Location: Ouddorp, Netherlands
- Interactive map of Dorpskerk
- Coordinates: 51°48′0″N 3°56′0″E

Architecture
- Completed: 1348
- Capacity: 1,160

The Dorpskerk (town church) also known as the Maartenskerk in Ouddorp (South Holland, Netherlands) was completed in 1348 and is situated in the town's centre. The tower was completed in the early 16th century. The church was completely renovated in the 18th century. The church and tower are rijksmonuments, listed as number 16267 and 16268.

The 1,160 seat church is still in use by the Restored Reformed Church. Originally it was a Roman Catholic church. During the Reformation it became a Protestant church. In 2010, the church was transferred from the Dutch Reformed Church to the Restored Reformed Church.
