= Achthuizen =

- Village
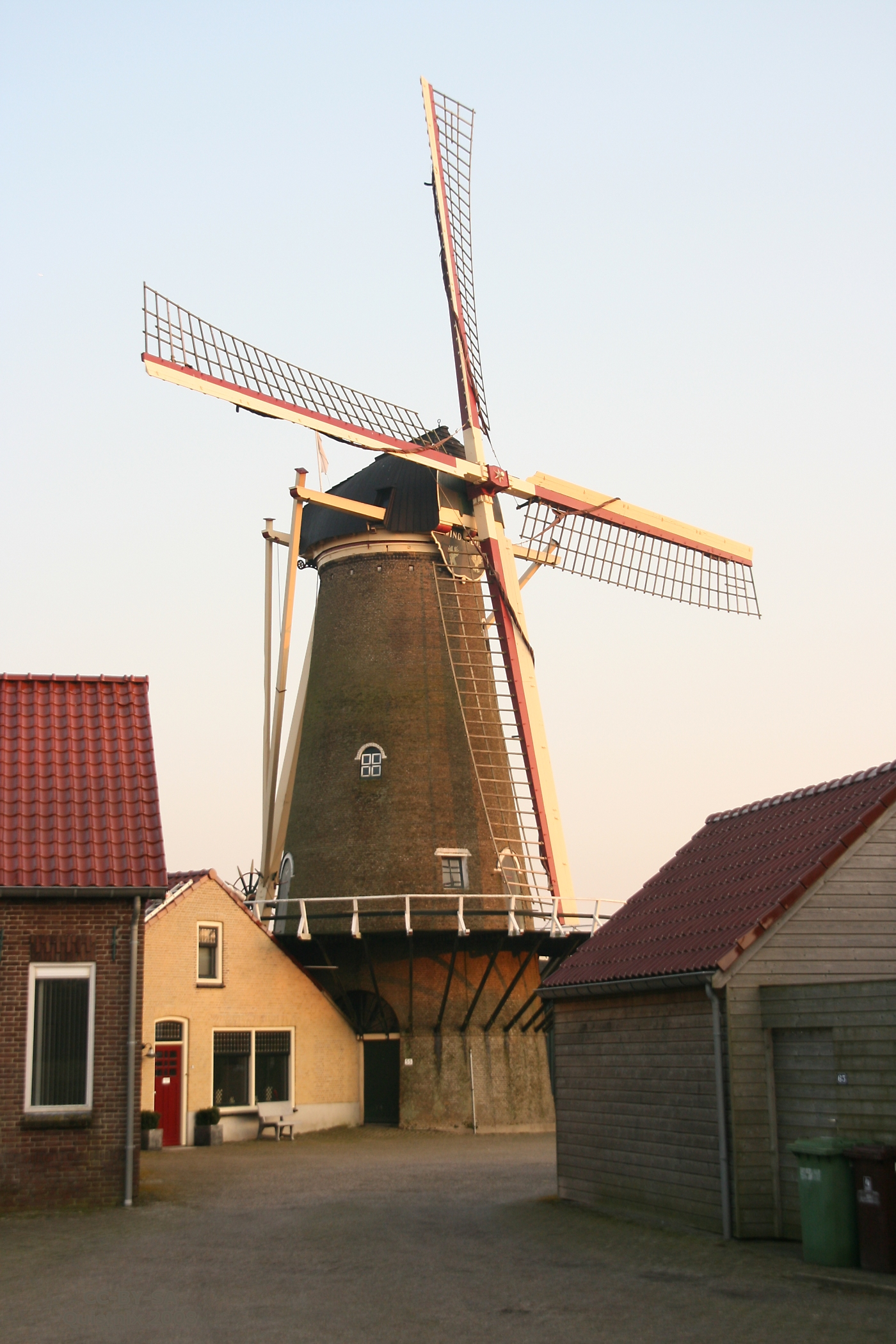
- Windmill Windlust

- Flag Coat of arms

- Location in the province of South Holland in the Netherlands Location in the Netherlands
- Coordinates: 51.6872262°N 4.2811338°E
- Country: Netherlands
- Province: South Holland
- Municipality: Goeree-Overflakkee

Area
  - Total: 10.63 km^{2} (4.10 sq mi)
- Elevation: 0.5 m (1.6 ft)

Population (2021)
  - Total: 1,075
  - Density: 101.1/km^{2} (261.9/sq mi)
- Time zone: UTC+1 (CET)
  - Summer (DST): UTC+2 (CEST)
- Postal code: 3256
- Dialing code: 0187

Achthuizen is a village in the Dutch province of South Holland. It is a part of the municipality of Goeree-Overflakkee, and lies about 17 km south of Spijkenisse.

The village was first mentioned around 1750 as "De Agthuisen", and means "eight houses". Achthuizen has two diagonally placed centres and looks like a number 8 from the air. Most of the settlement dates from after 1930. Achthuizen was a Roman Catholic enclave on the Protestant island of Goeree. The Catholic Assumption of Mary Church is a neoclassic church from 1846.

The village has a working windmill, Windlust, which is operated on a volunteer basis.

== Gallery ==
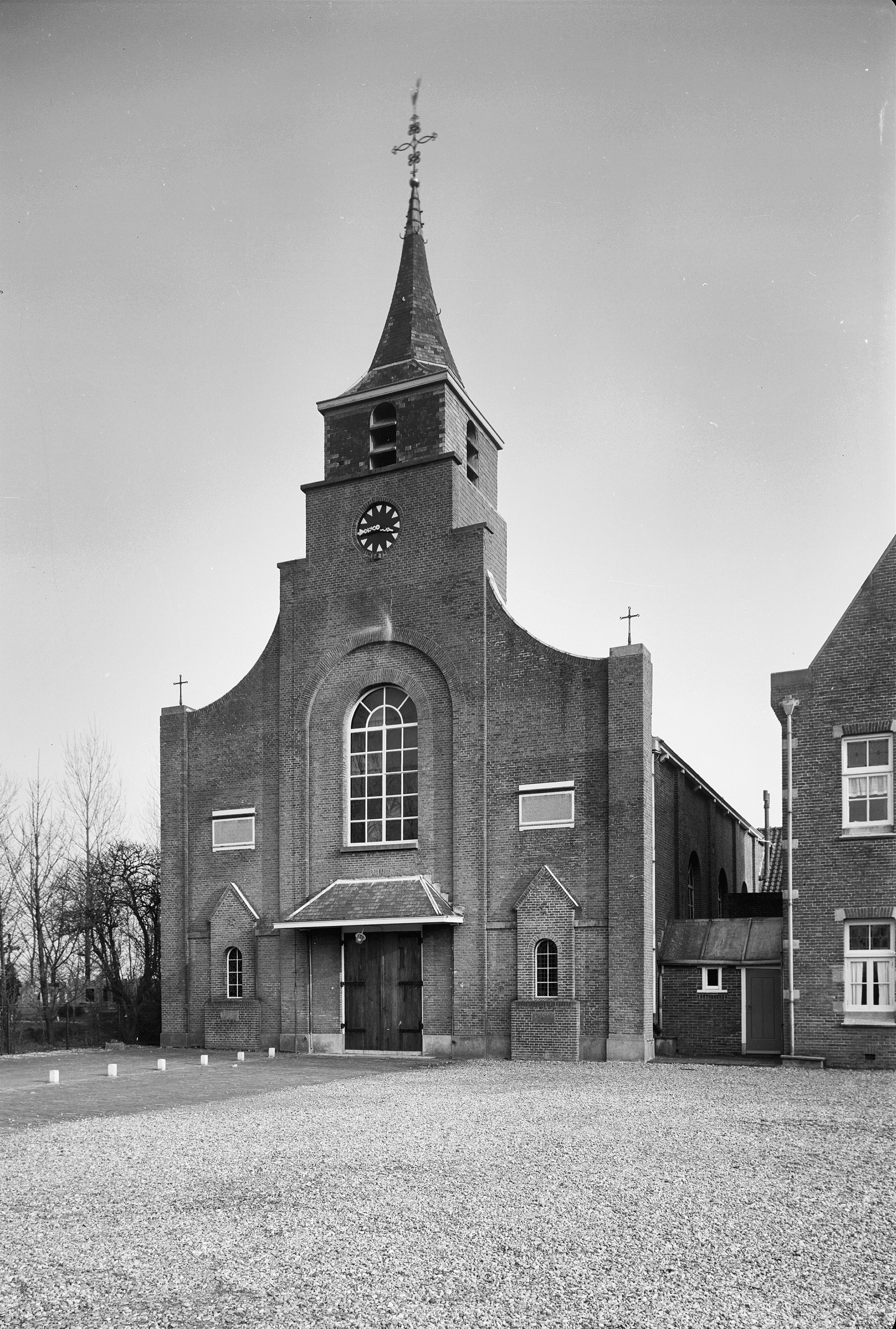
Assumption of Mary Church (1968)

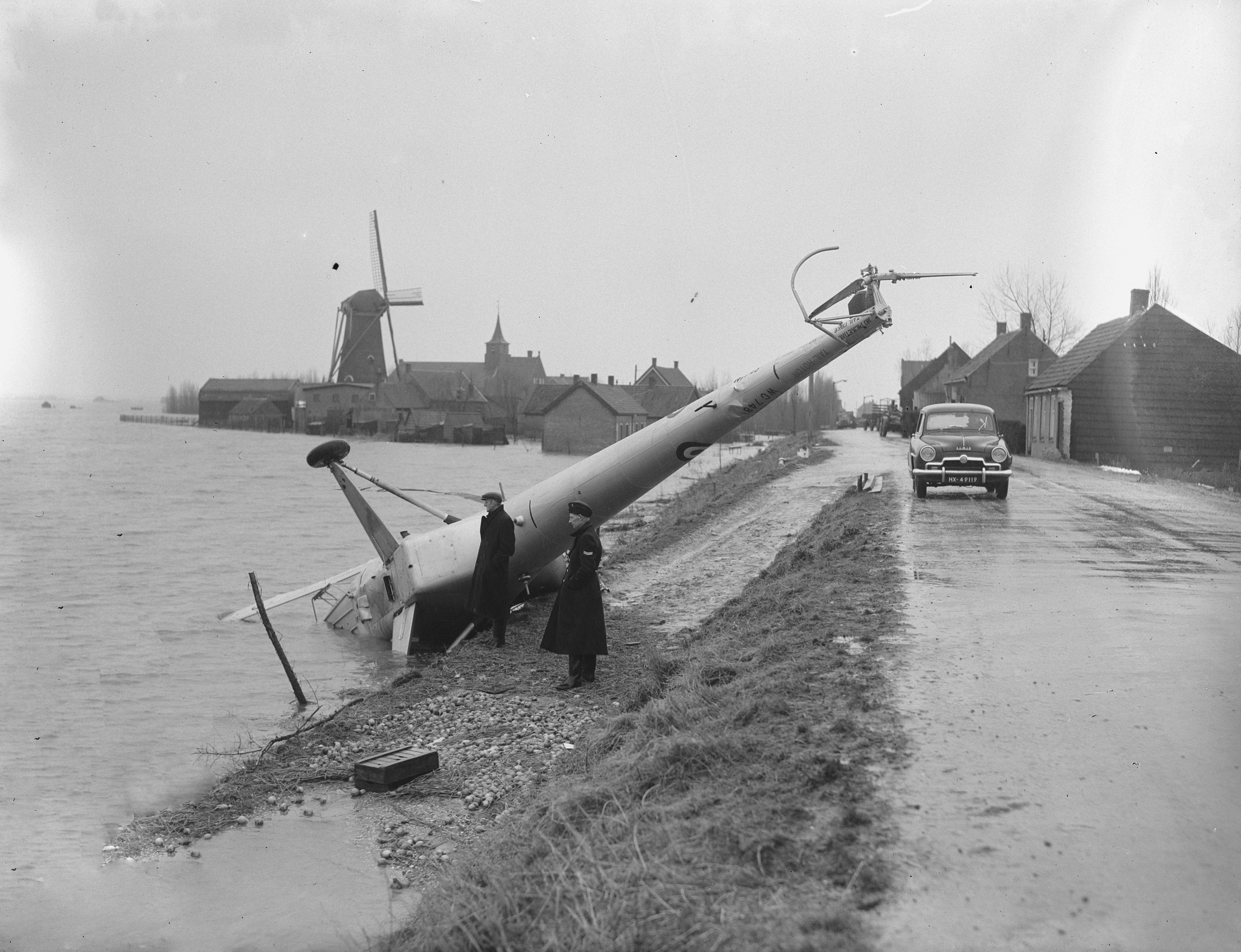
Crashed helicopter during the North Sea flood of 1953
