= Ouddorp =

- Village
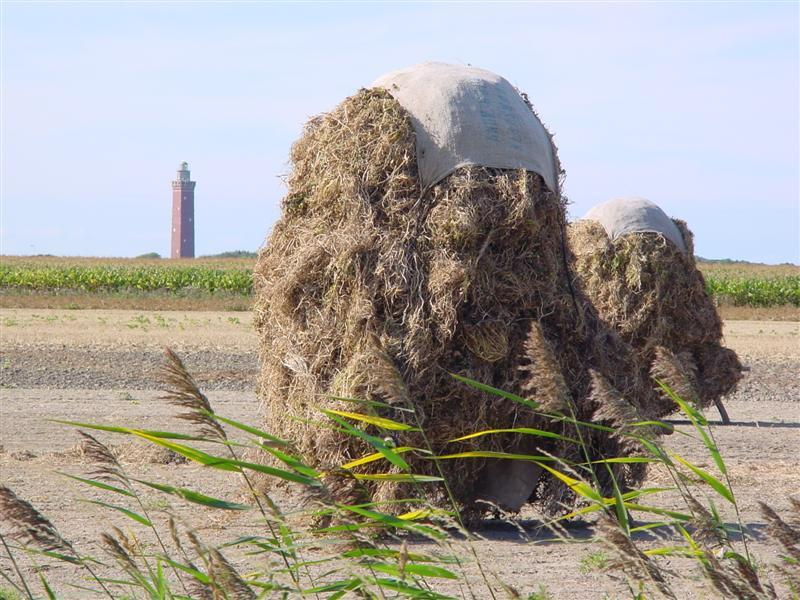
- Typical landscape in Ouddorp

- Flag Coat of arms

- Location in the province of South Holland in the Netherlands Location in the Netherlands
- Coordinates: 51.8082°N 3.9346°E
- Country: Netherlands
- Province: South Holland
- Municipality: Goeree-Overflakkee

Area
  - Total: 32.52 km^{2} (12.56 sq mi)
- Elevation: 2.1 m (6.9 ft)

Population (2021)
  - Total: 6,215
  - Density: 191.1/km^{2} (495.0/sq mi)
- Time zone: UTC+1 (CET)
  - Summer (DST): UTC+2 (CEST)
- Postal code: 3253
- Dialing code: 0187

Ouddorp is a village in the Dutch province of South Holland. It is part of the municipality of Goeree-Overflakkee. It is often referred to as Ouddorp aan Zee (Outdorp on the Sea) to promote itself as a seaside resort, because the village has an 18 kilometres (11 mi) long beach which is the longest of the Netherlands.

== History ==
The village was first mentioned in 1551 as "Outdorp in Westvoirne", and means "old village". Old refers to land which has not been reclaimed by poldering. Ouddorp is a circular village around a church which developed in the Middle Ages. It used to be the centre of the former island of Goeree, but was overshadowed by Goedereede. South of Ouddorp is a terp (artificial hill) on which Spreeuwenberg Castle was built in the 13th century, but only the hill remained.

The Dutch Reformed church has a free standing tower. The choir dates from 1348. The nave was rebuilt in 1734 on a smaller scale which resulted in a detached tower. In 1903, conference rooms were added between the church and tower. The Reformed Church dates from 1892, but was damaged in 1944 and received its current shape during the restoration of 1946 and 1947.

The grist mill De Hoop was built in 1845. It was restored between 1982 and 1984. An electro motor has been installed, but it is often in service by wind power, and supplies a nearby pet shop and bakery. Lighthouse Westhoofd was built between 1947 and 1948 as a replacement of the 1911 lighthouse which was blown up the Germans on 4 May 1945. The lighthouse has a cellar and 7 stories. It measures c. 52 metres (171 ft).

Ouddorp was home to 1,951 people in 1840. In 1860, a harbour was constructed to the south of the village. After World War II, Ouddorp started to developed as a seaside resort. It was a separate municipality until 1966, when it became part of Goedereede. In 2013, it became part of the municipality of Goeree-Overflakkee.

The former town hall and polder house contain the regional museum.

== Gallery ==
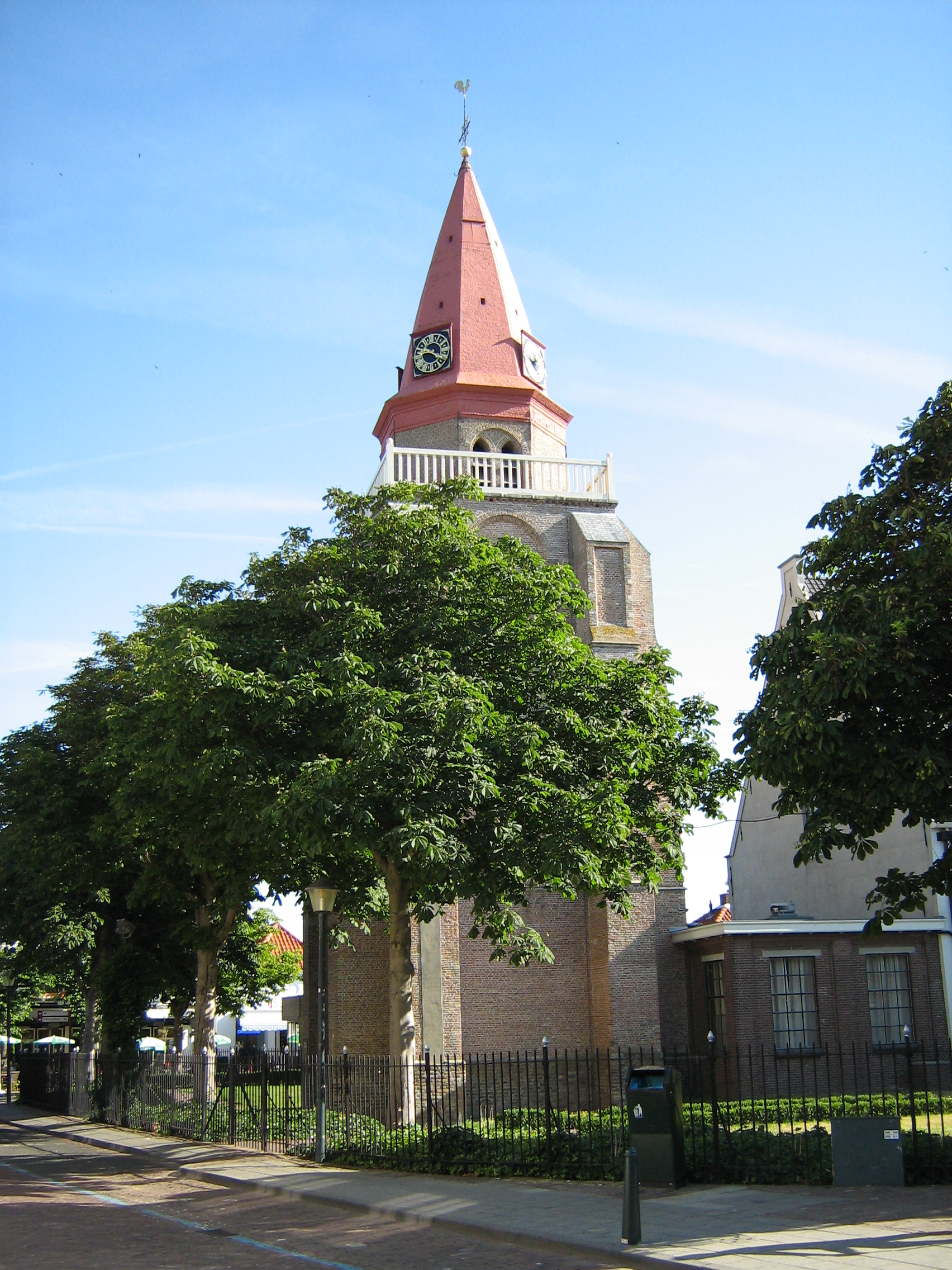
Centre of Ouddorp

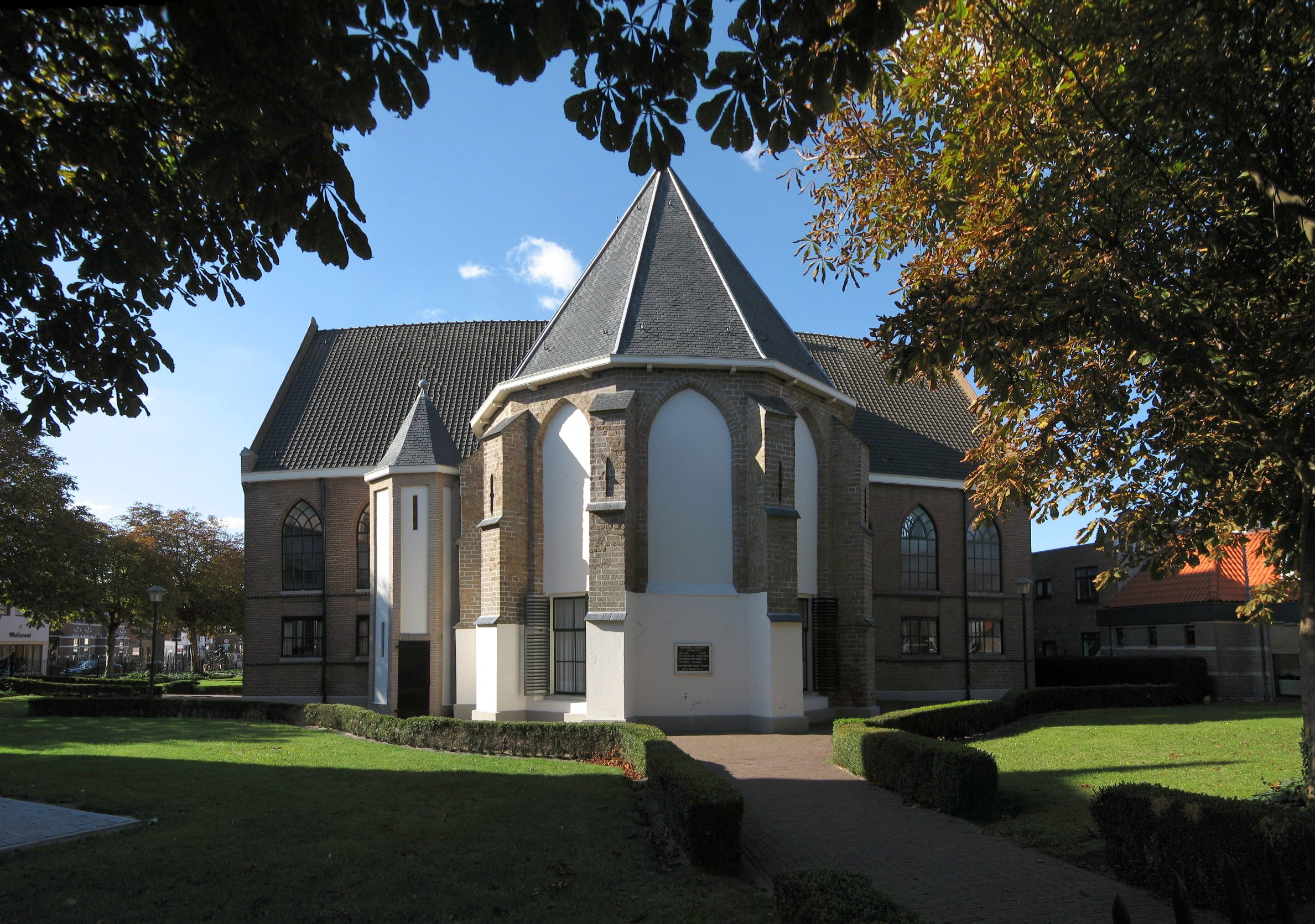
Dorpskerk, Ouddorp

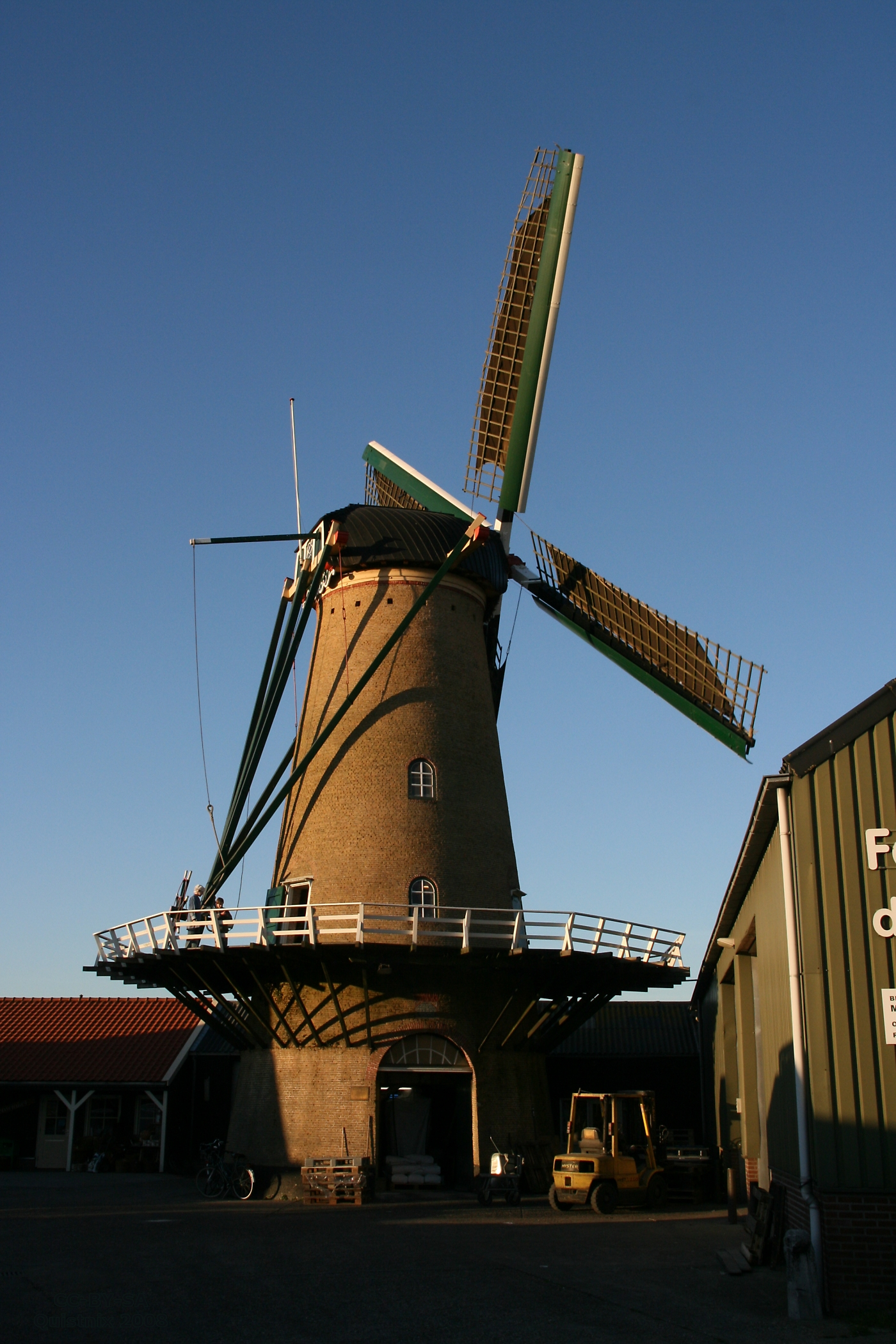
Gristmill "De Hoop"

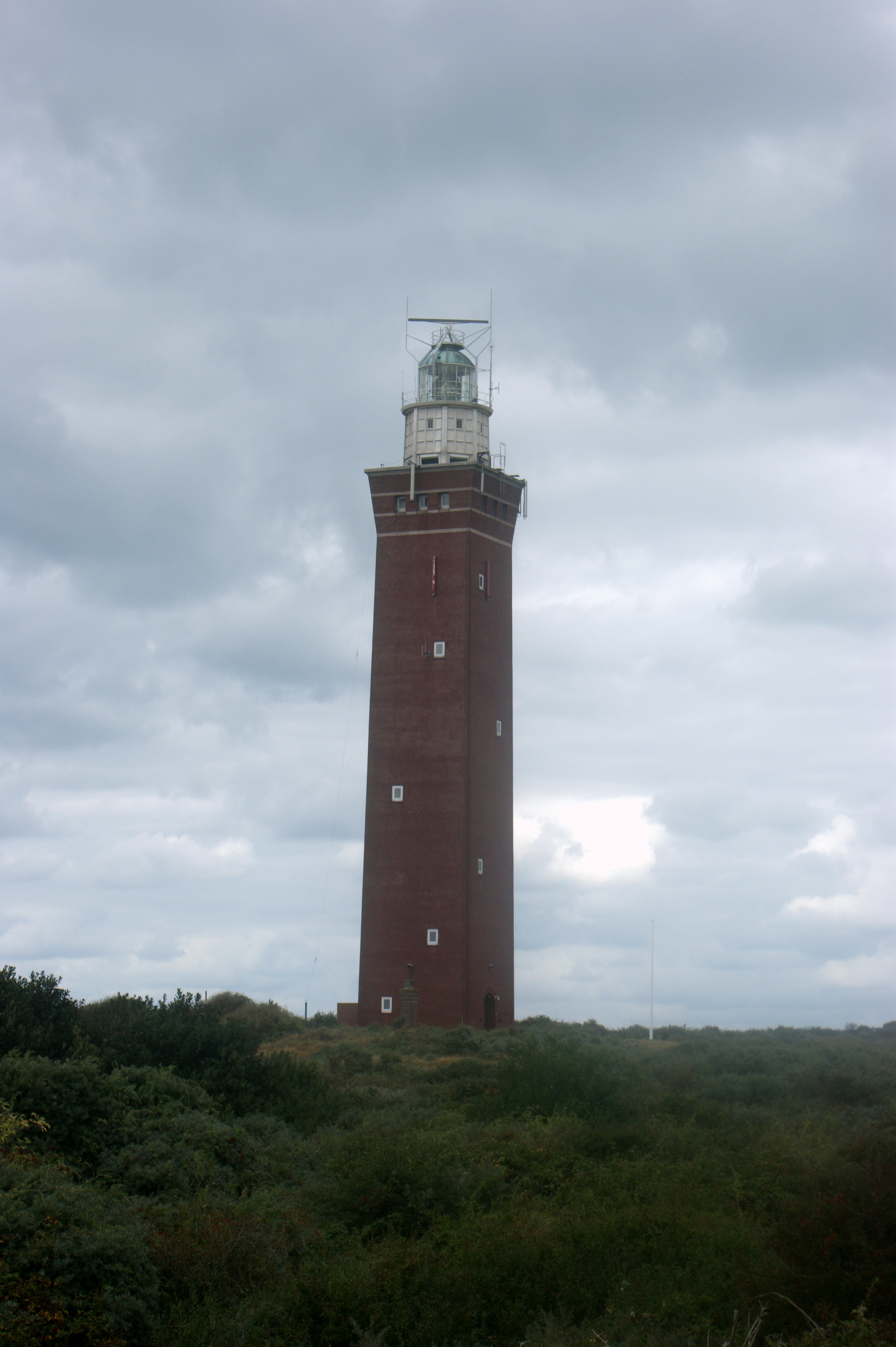
Lighthouse "Westhoofd"

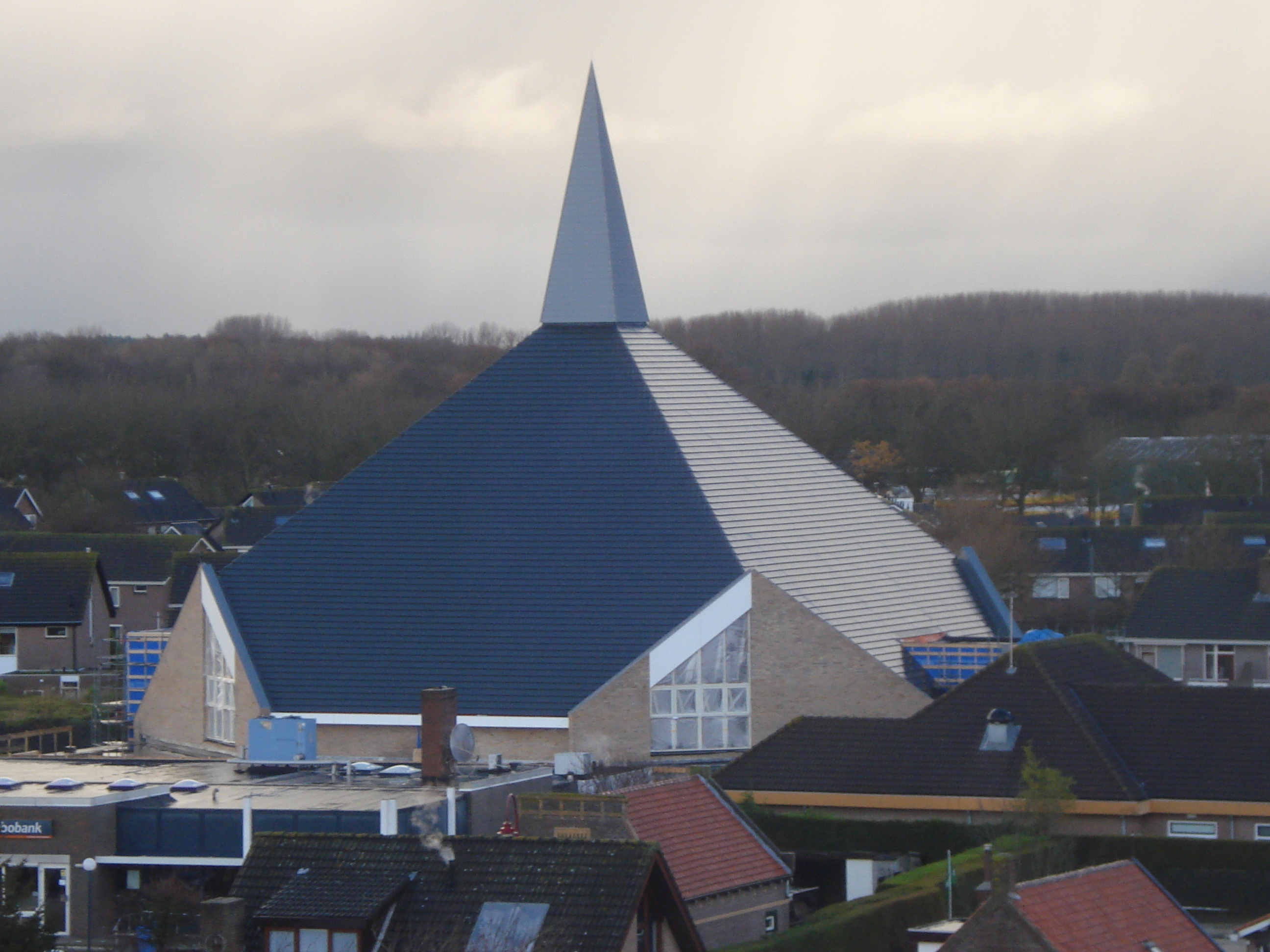
The new Eben-Haëzer church (2013)
