= De Hoop, Ouddorp =

Dutch windmill

De Hoop
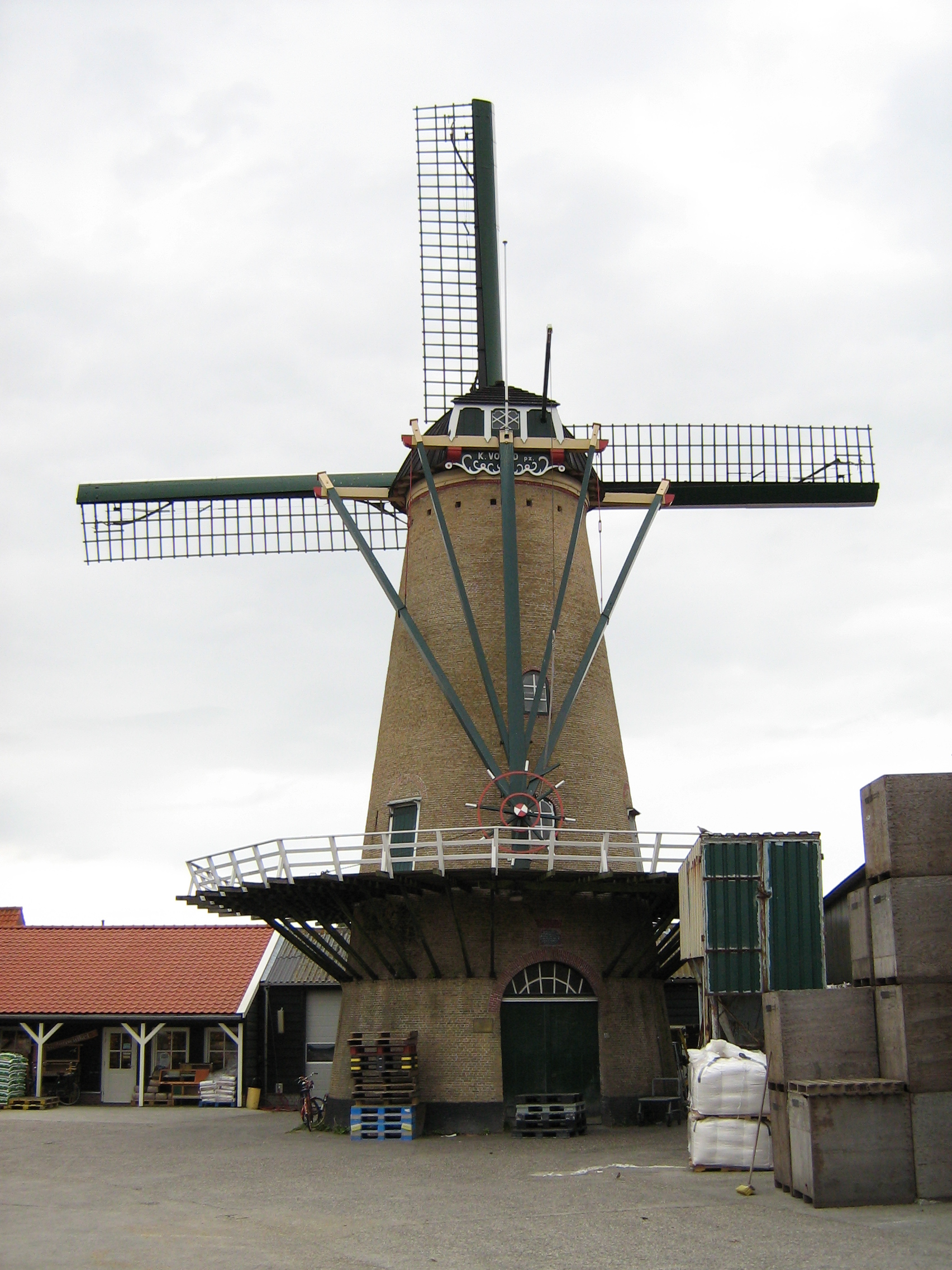
- De Hoop windmill
- Interactive map of De Hoop

Origin
- Mill location: Ouddorp, Goeree-Overflakkee, Netherlands
- Coordinates: 51.812542°N 3.933159°E
- Operator: Piet Voogd
- Year built: 1845

Information
- Purpose: Grinding grain professionally
- Type: Round stone mill
- Type of sails: 22.06 metres (72.4 ft)

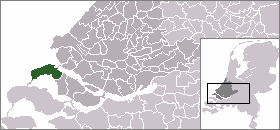
Location of Ouddorp in the Netherlands

De Hoop ("Hope") is a flour windmill in Ouddorp built in 1845 and fully renovated in 1984. It is one of the few windmills in the Netherlands that is still privately owned, and is still in full commercial operation.

== History ==
Ouddorp is a village on the northwestern tip of the island of Goeree-Overflakkee in Zeeland, with a 14th-century church in the marketplace. The precursor of the mill was built around 1600. The old mill most likely had two pairs of millstone. In 1844 the Voogd family decided to close the old mill and replace it with a round stone mill with three pairs of stones.

The mill was built in 1845 for J. Zoeter and D. Voogd, on the site of an existing mill. Until 1952 it had three pairs of millstones for grinding grain for the local farmers. It was then out of service for some time. Between 1982 and 1984 there was a major renovation in which the sails were overhauled and given automatic speed controls. The machinery was entirely replaced. Significant repairs and upgrades were again made in 2008, 2011 and 2012.

== Operations ==
The mill now operates every day except Sunday, powered by electricity on weekdays and using wind power on Saturdays. The mill may be visited by appointment. The mill is still owned by the Voogd family. As of 2013 the owner was Piet Voogd. There is a store beside the mill where flour products are sold.

== Gallery ==
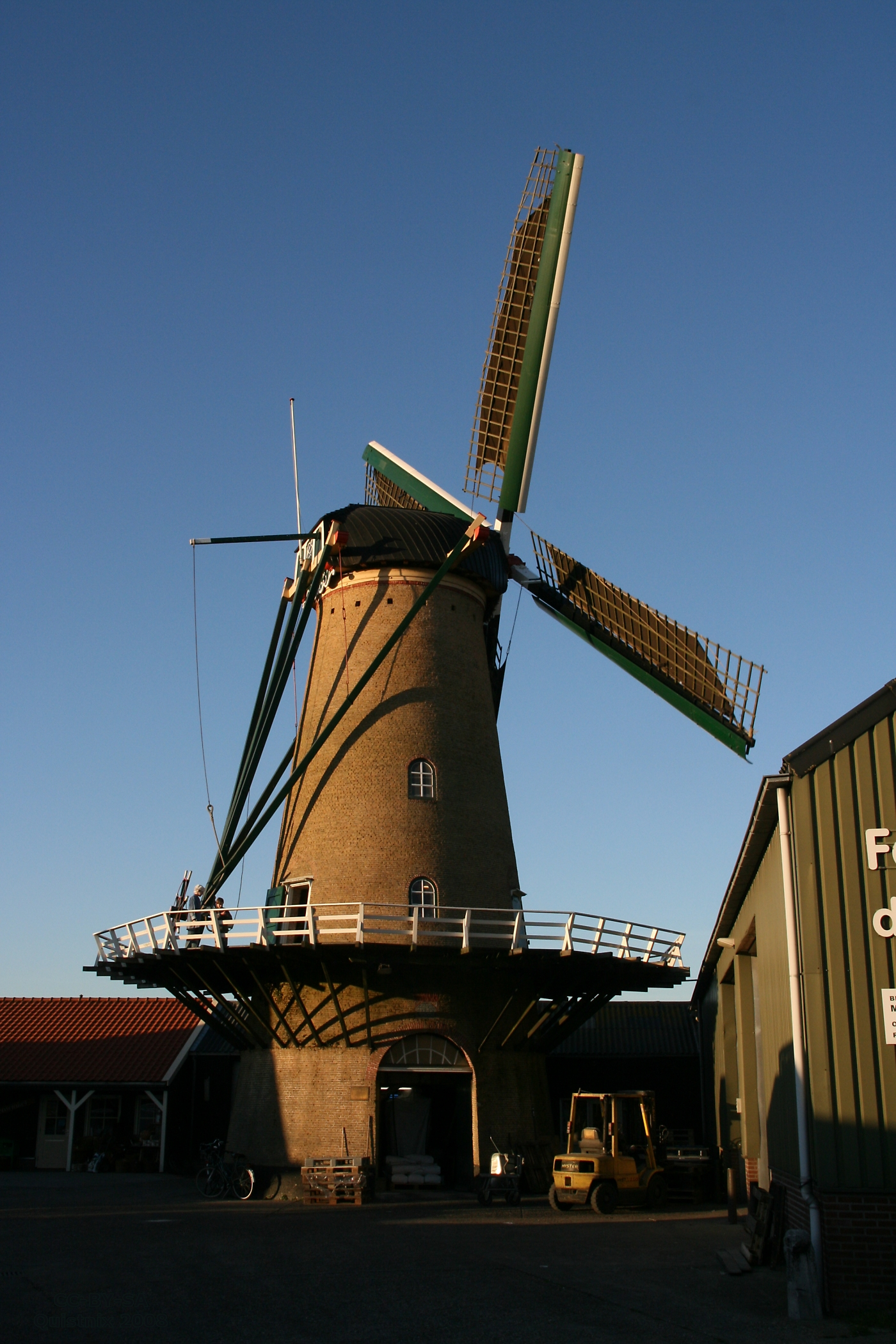
Mill in February 2008

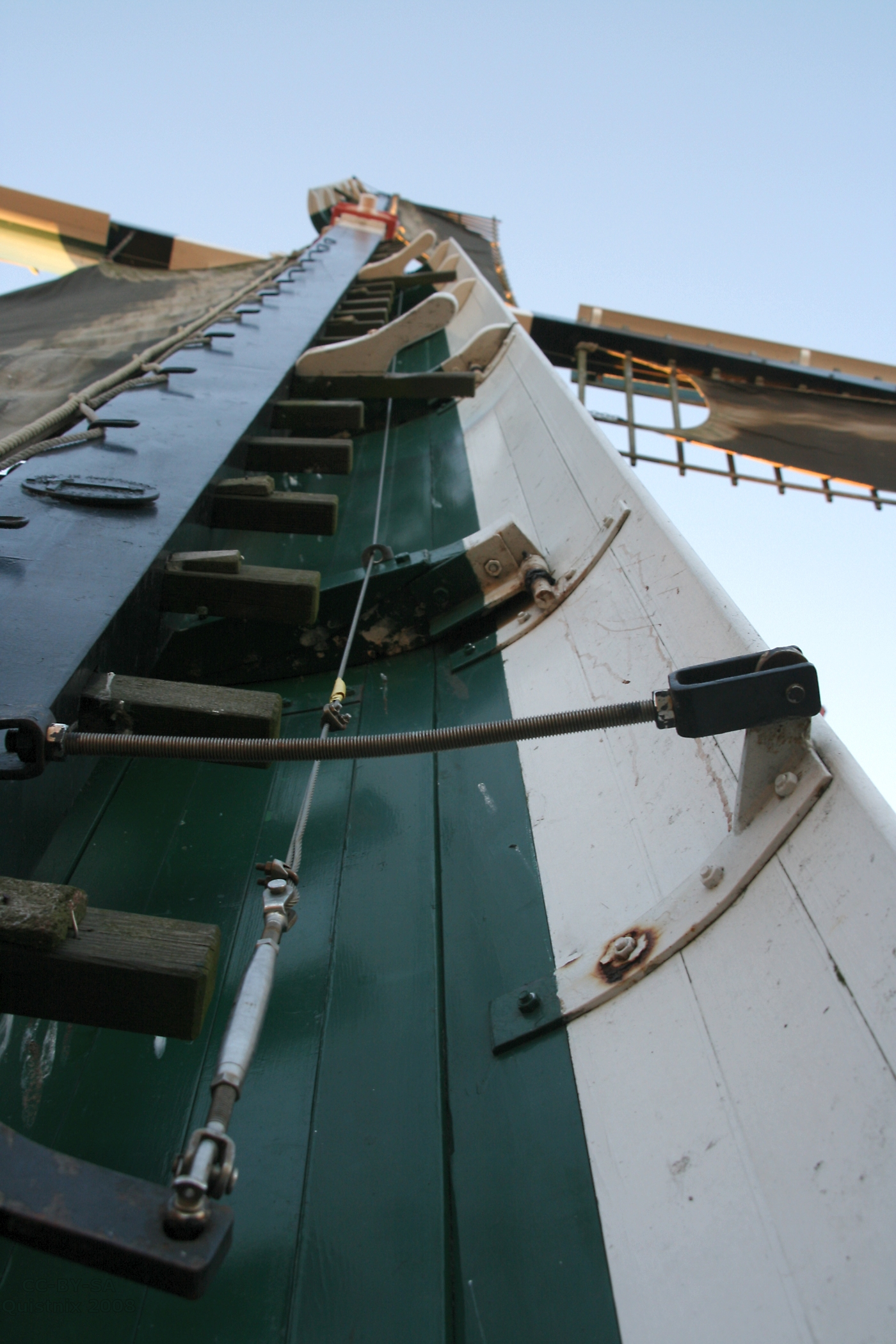
Sail with brake valve

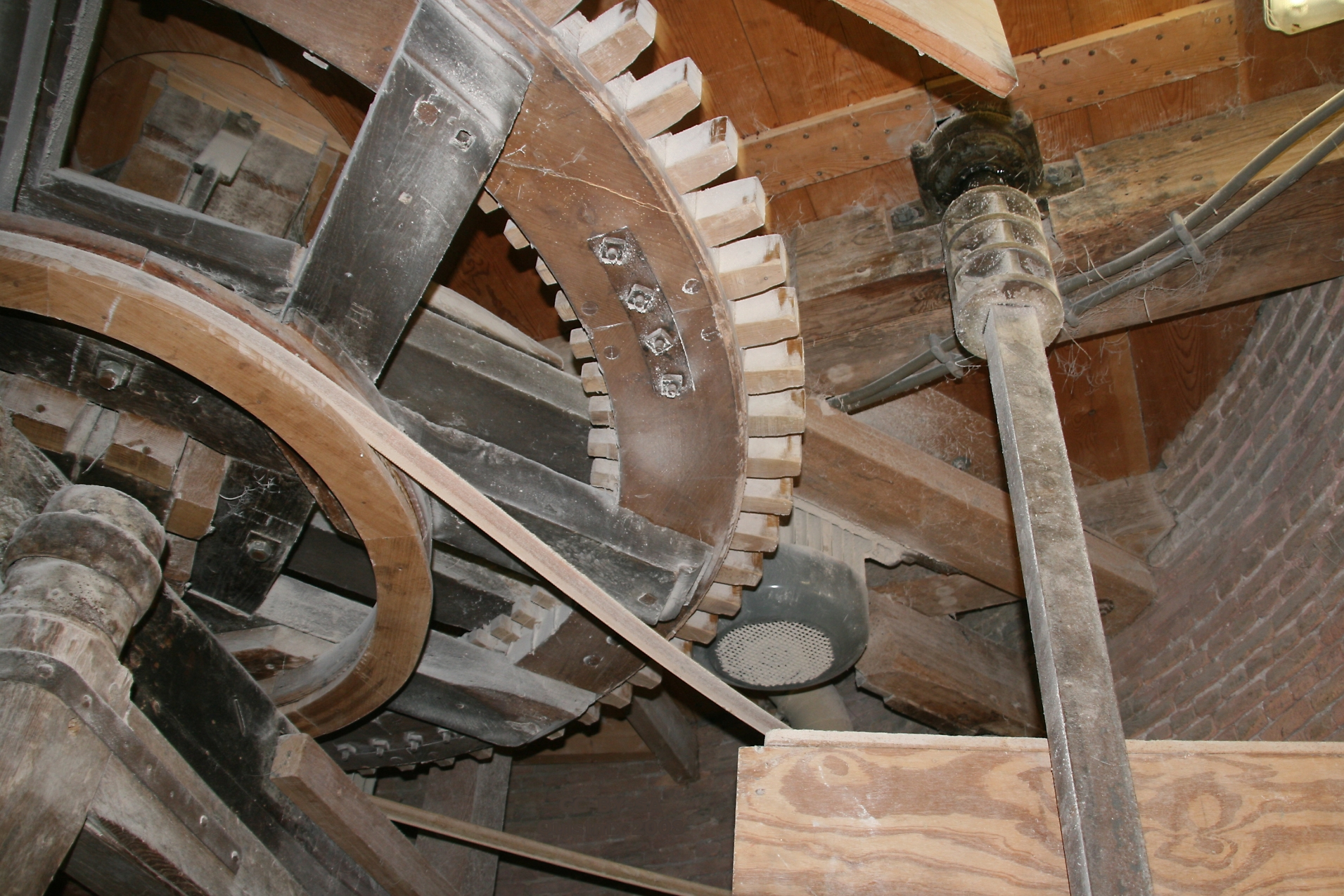
Track wheel and electric drive

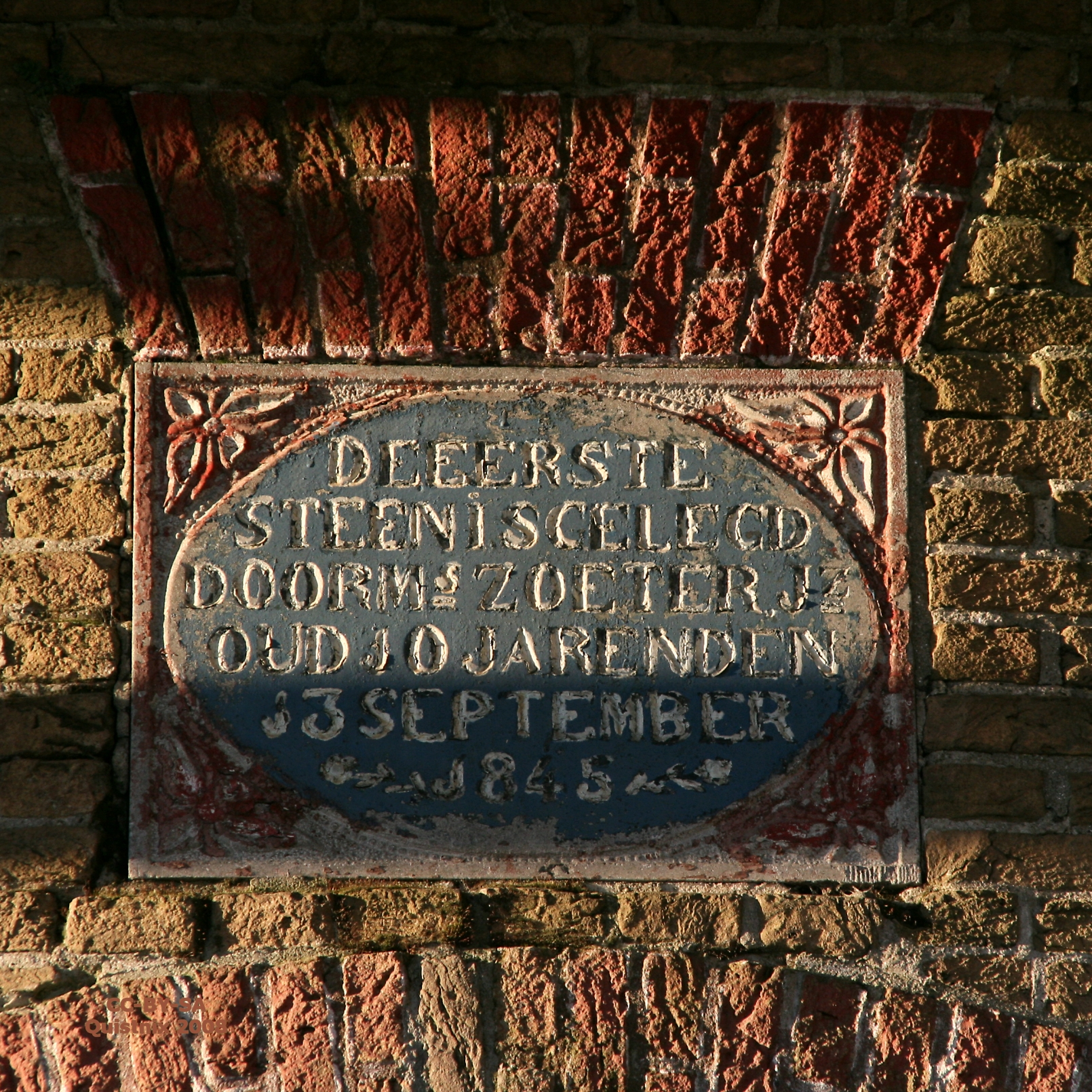
1845 memorial foundation stone
