= Museum De Valk =

Museum in Leiden, the Netherlands

De Valk
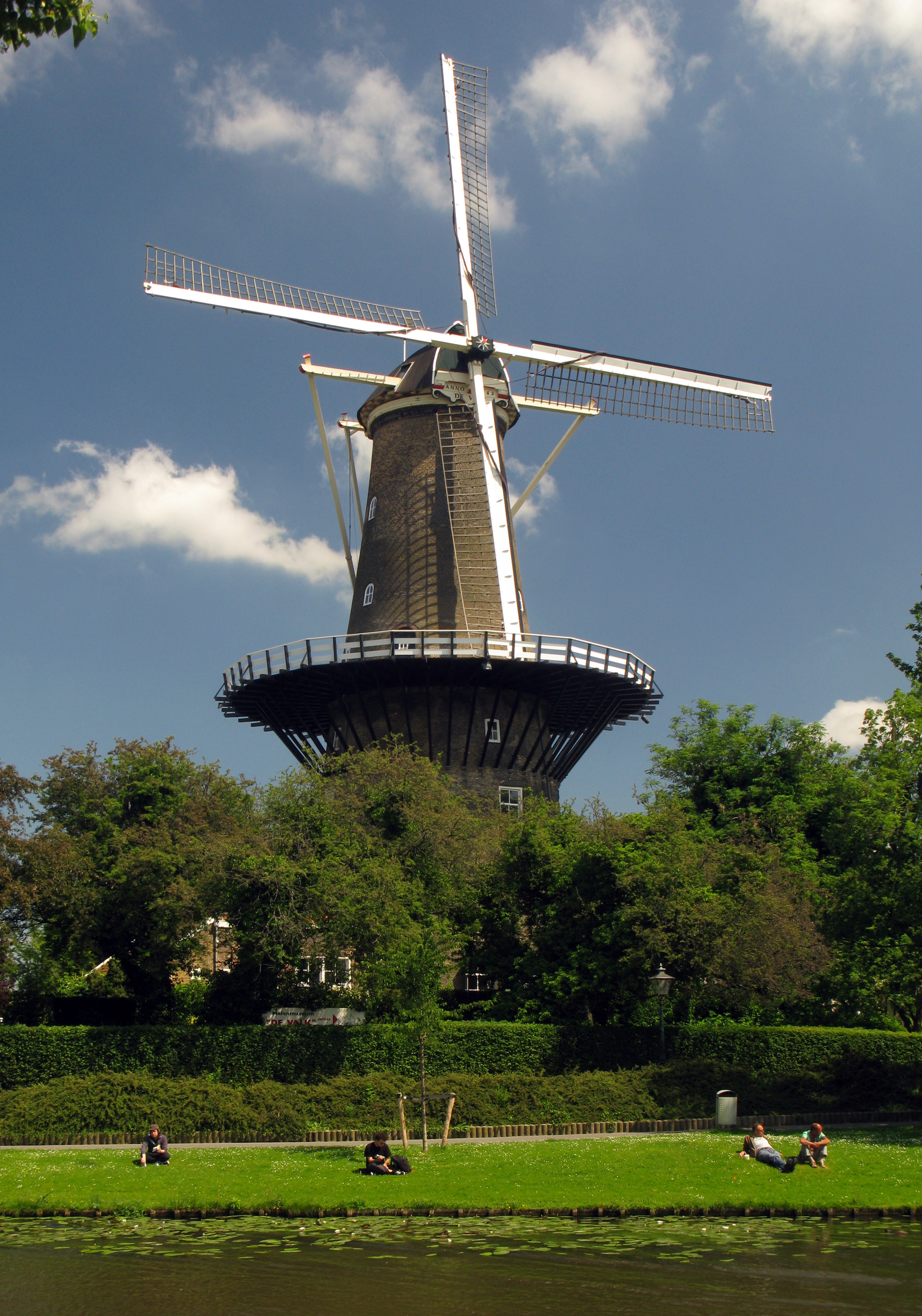
- De Valk (2007)

Origin
- Mill location: Leiden
- Coordinates: 52°09′52″N 4°29′11″E
- Year built: 1743

Information
- Type: tower mill
- Scoopwheel diameter: 29.5 yd
- Other information: museum

Stedelijk molenmuseum De Valk
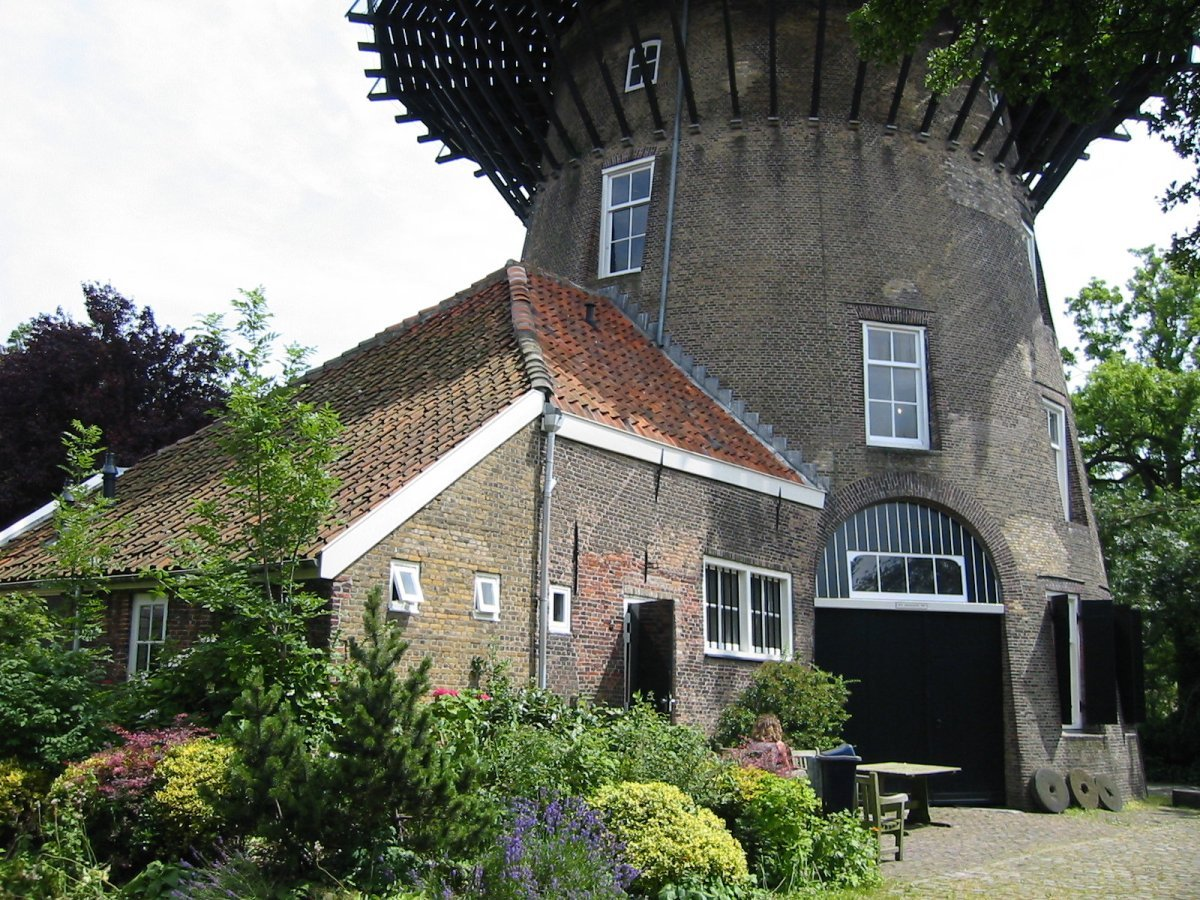
- Annex with museum entrance
- Established: June 2, 1966; 59 years ago
- Location: Leiden, Netherlands
- Type: tower mill
- Website: molenmuseumdevalk.nl

De Valk is a tower mill and museum in Leiden, Netherlands.

The current tower mill is the third mill built at this location. In 1611 the post mill "De Valck" was built, and in 1667 it was replaced by a wooden post mill. In 1743 a higher tower mill was built. De Valk originally was equipped with six mill stones. There were two dwellings in the mill, originally for the two owners, later for the miller and his assistant.

In June 1966 the mill became a municipal museum. In 2000, the De Valk mill became operationally functional again and has been used for milling.

== Gallery ==
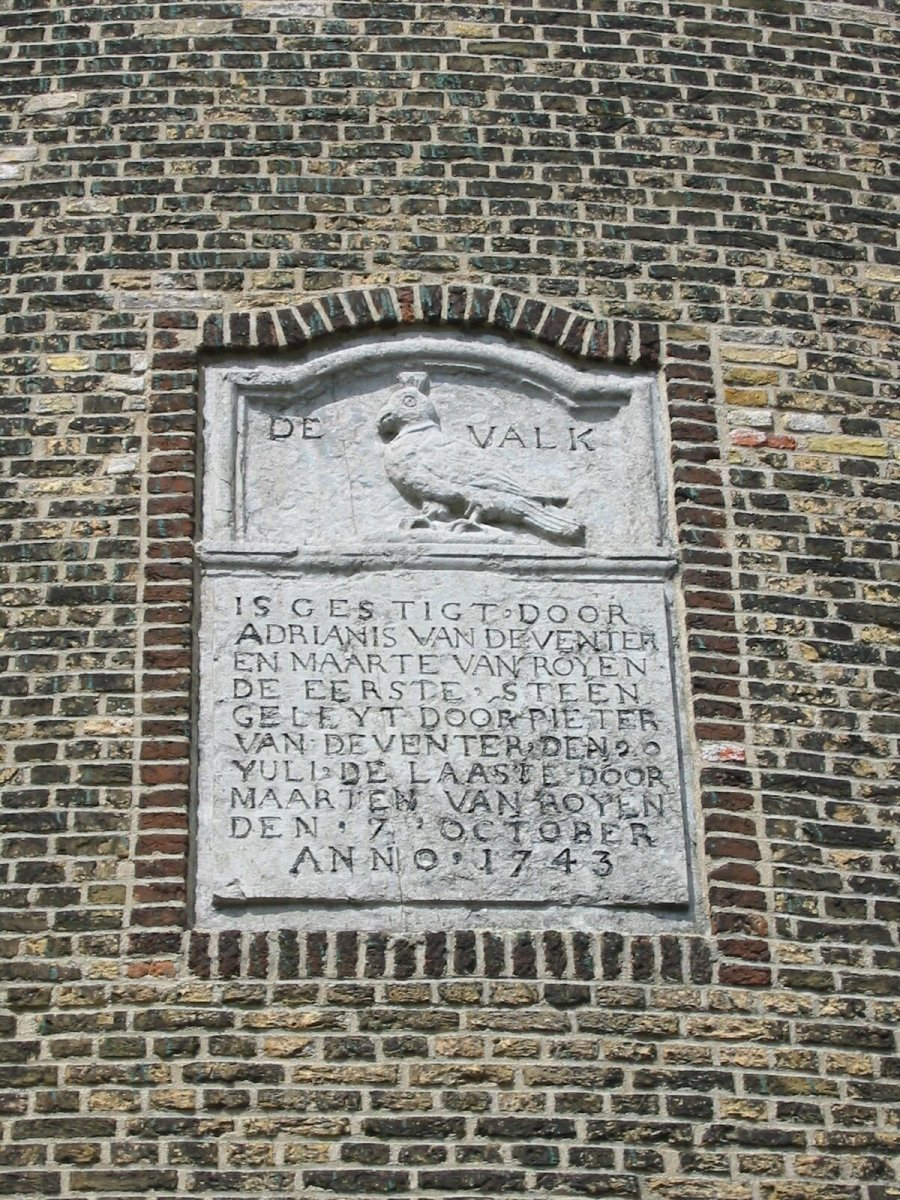
Gable at the south side

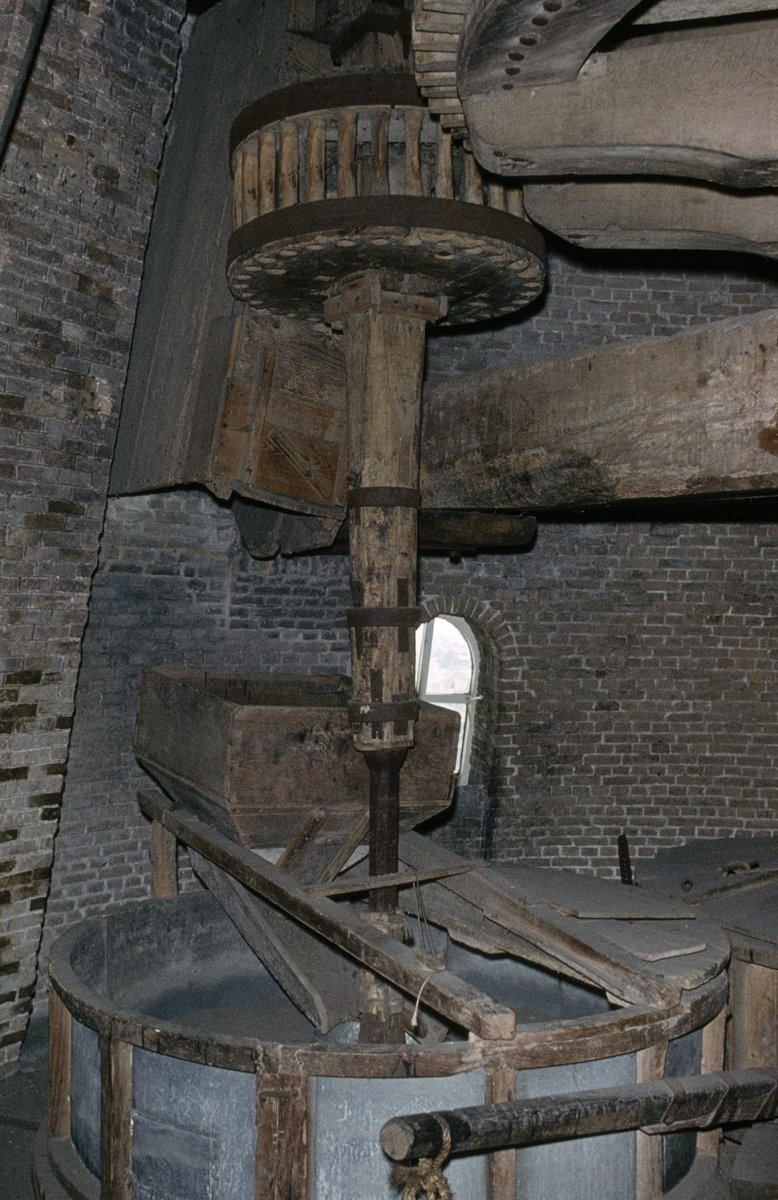
Machinery

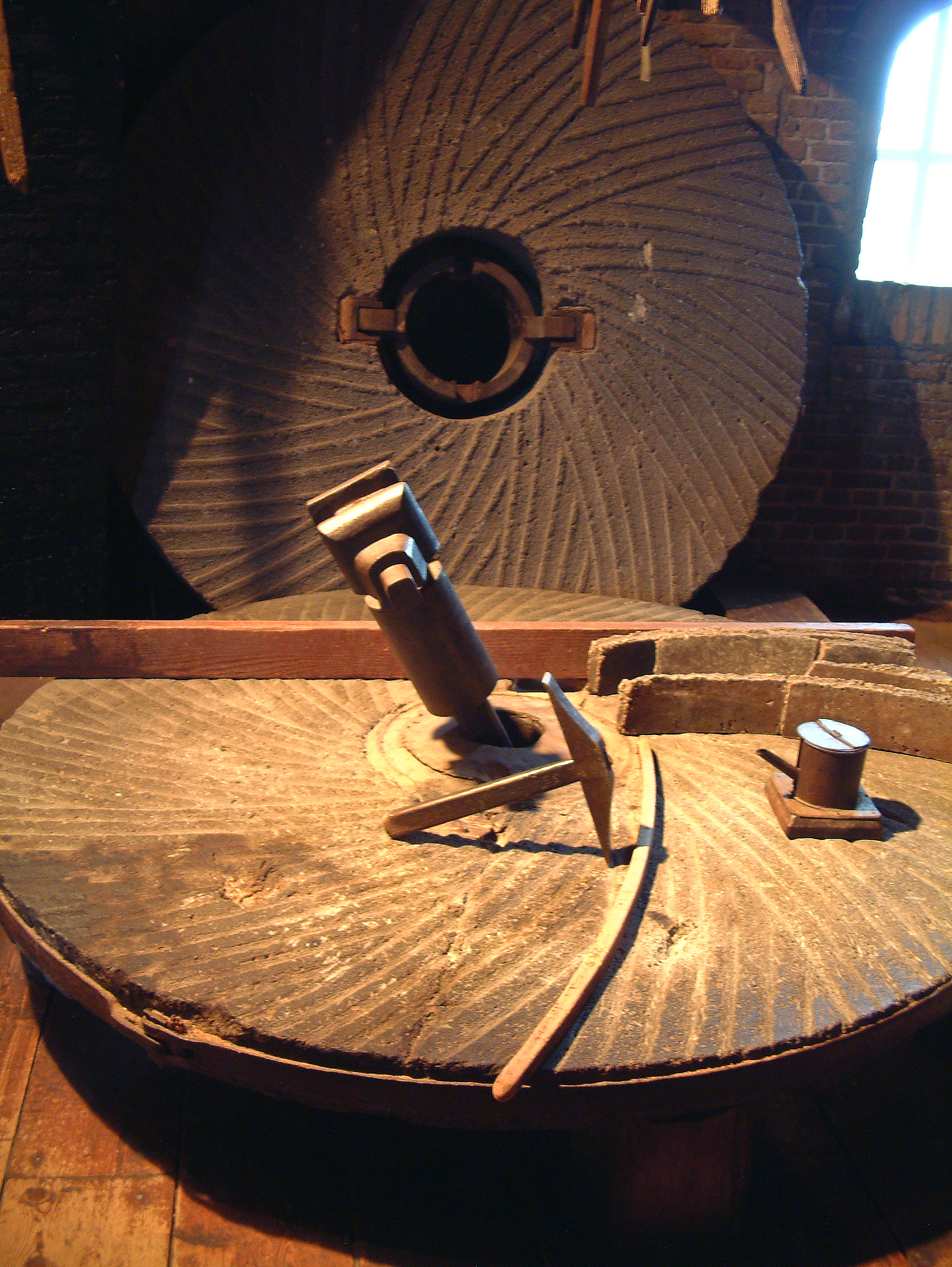
Mill stones

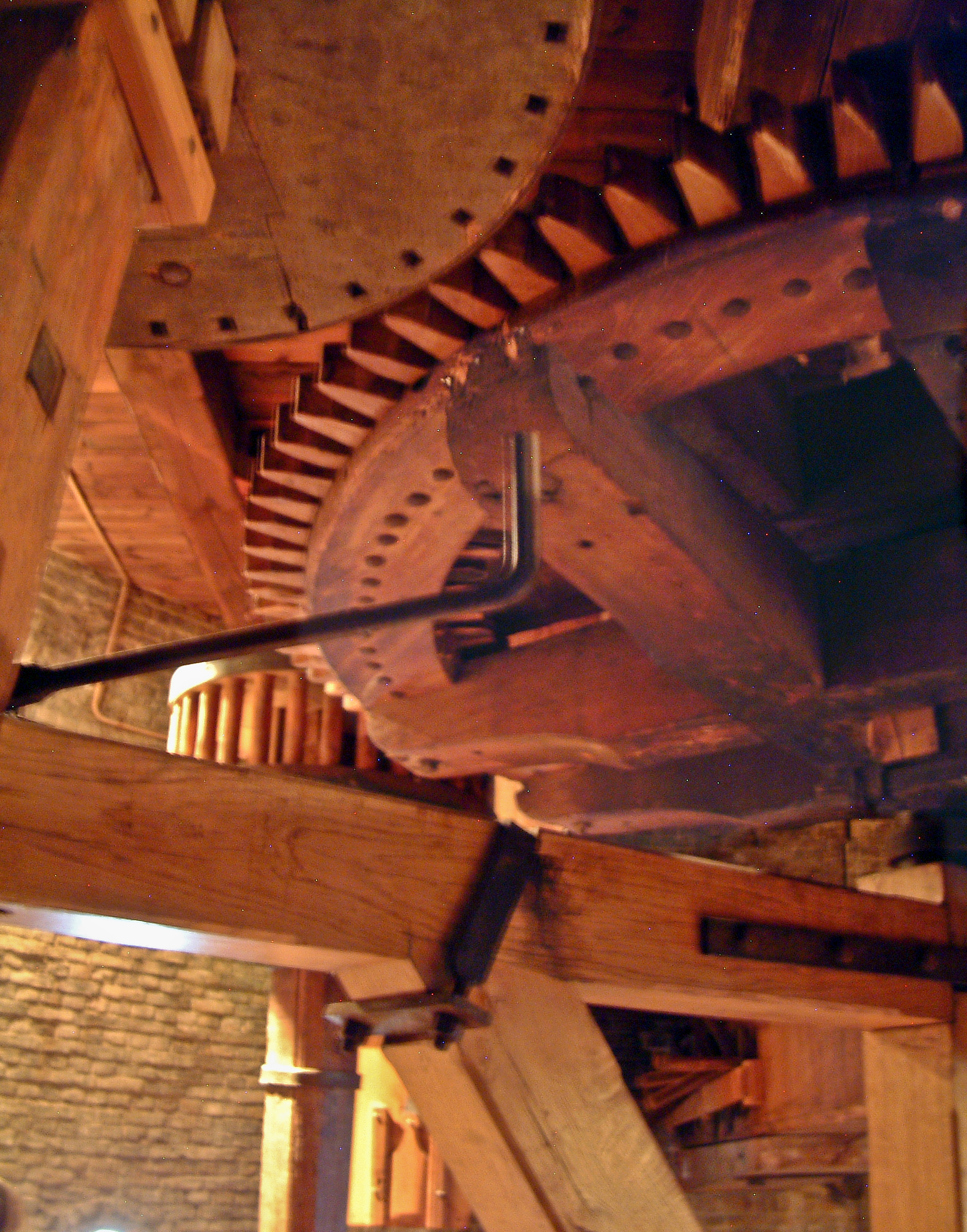
Gears

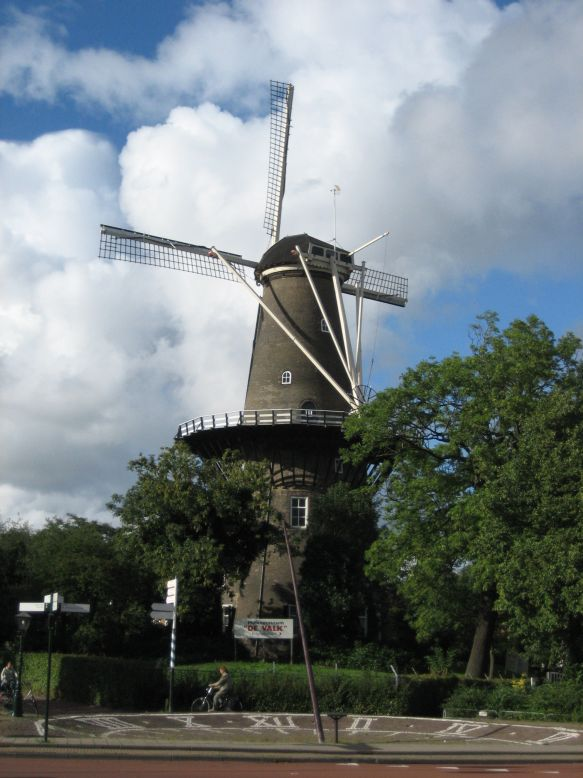
Mill with sun dial in front (2006)

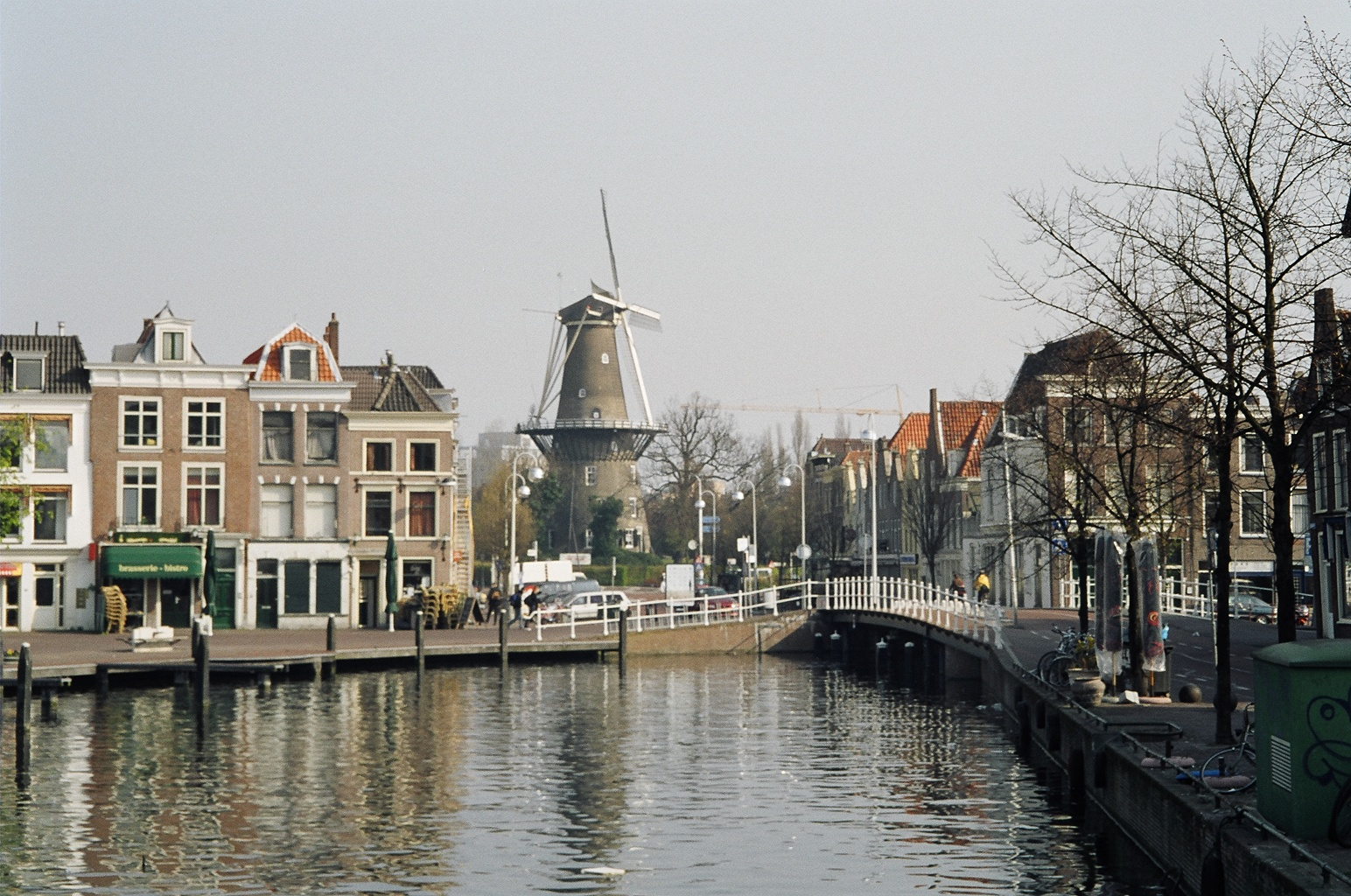
View from canal the Galgenwater, between Beestenmarkt and Turfmarkt (1973)

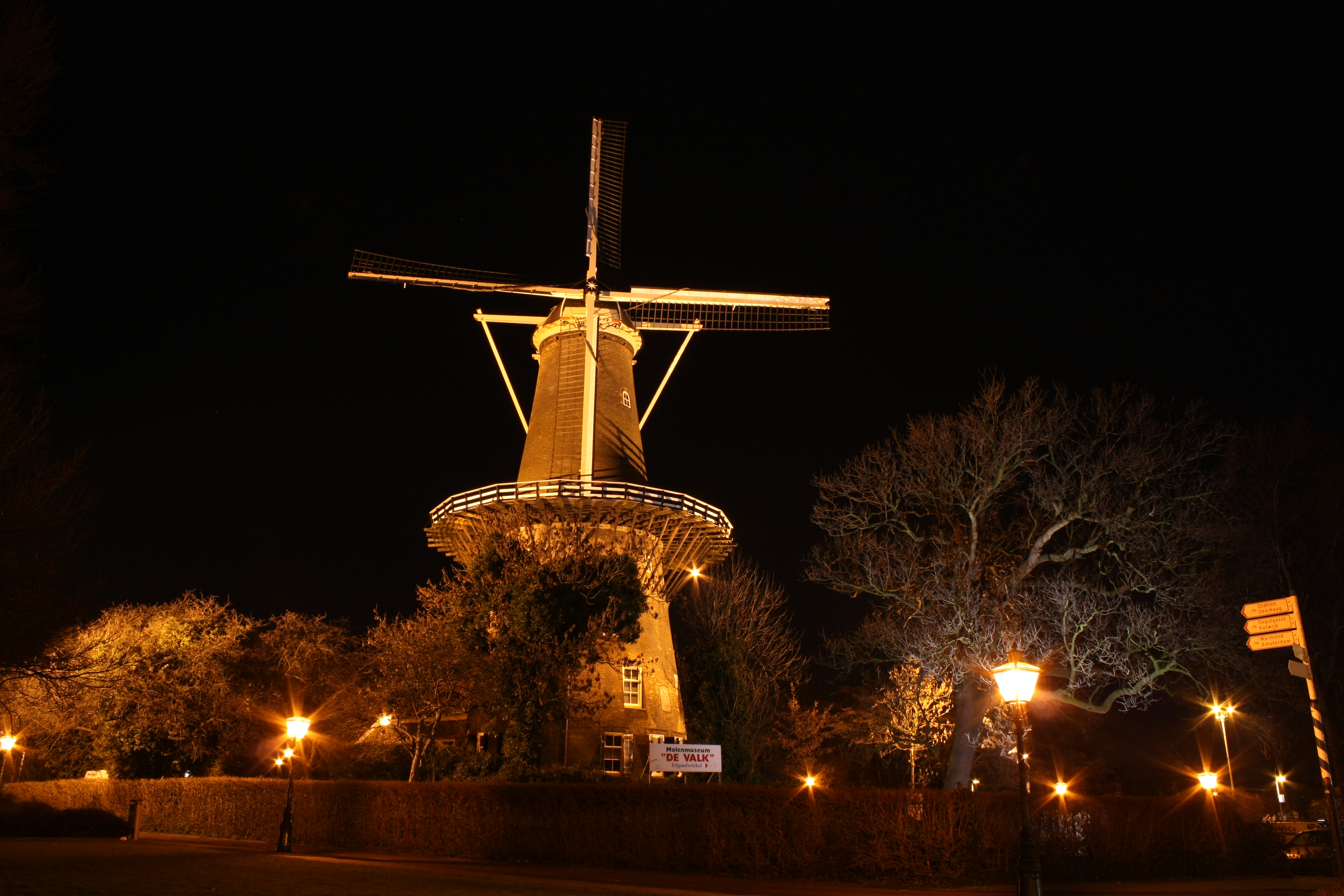
Night view (2009)

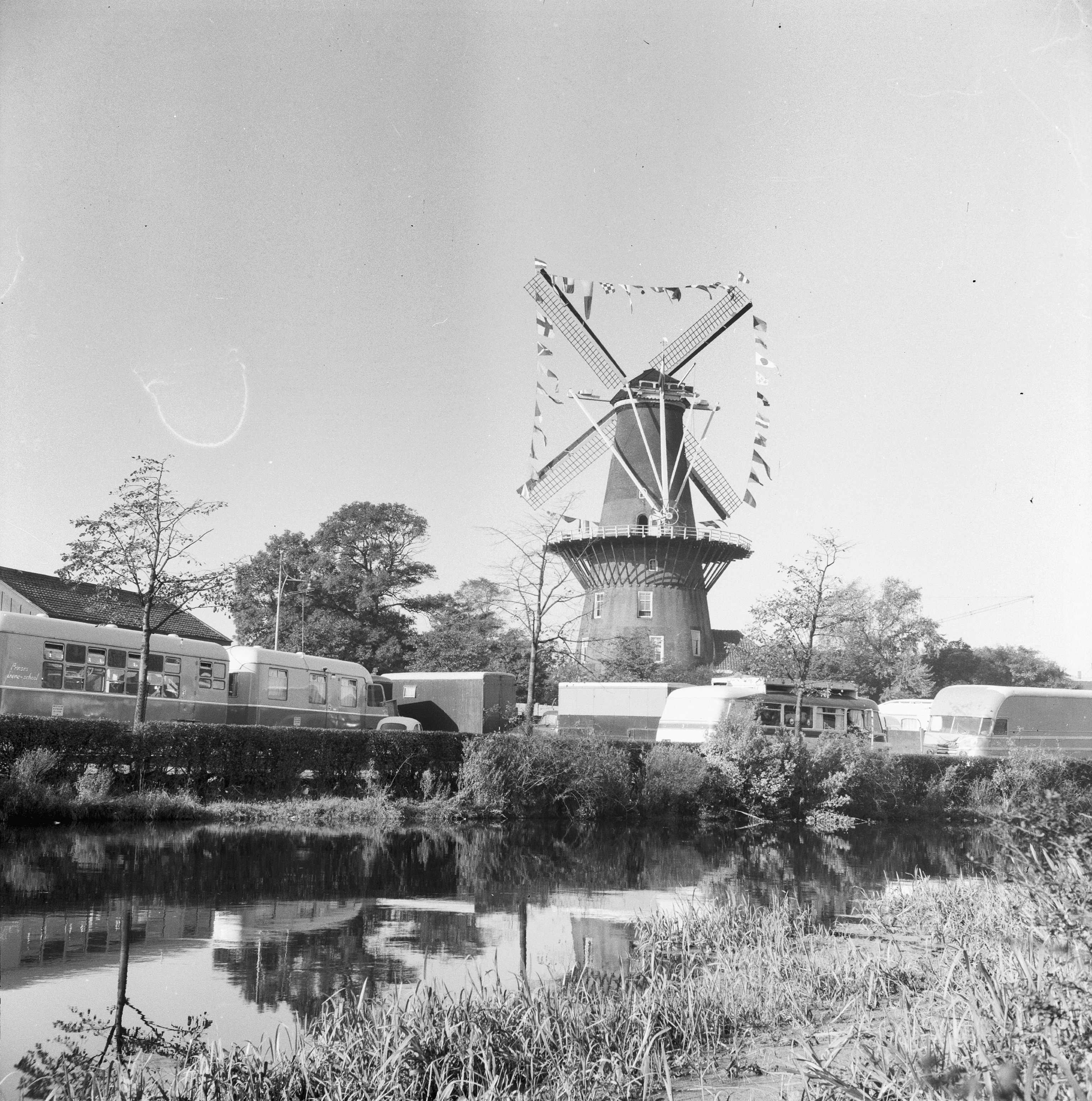
Adorned sails signalling festivities, during yearly October 3 Festival (1961)

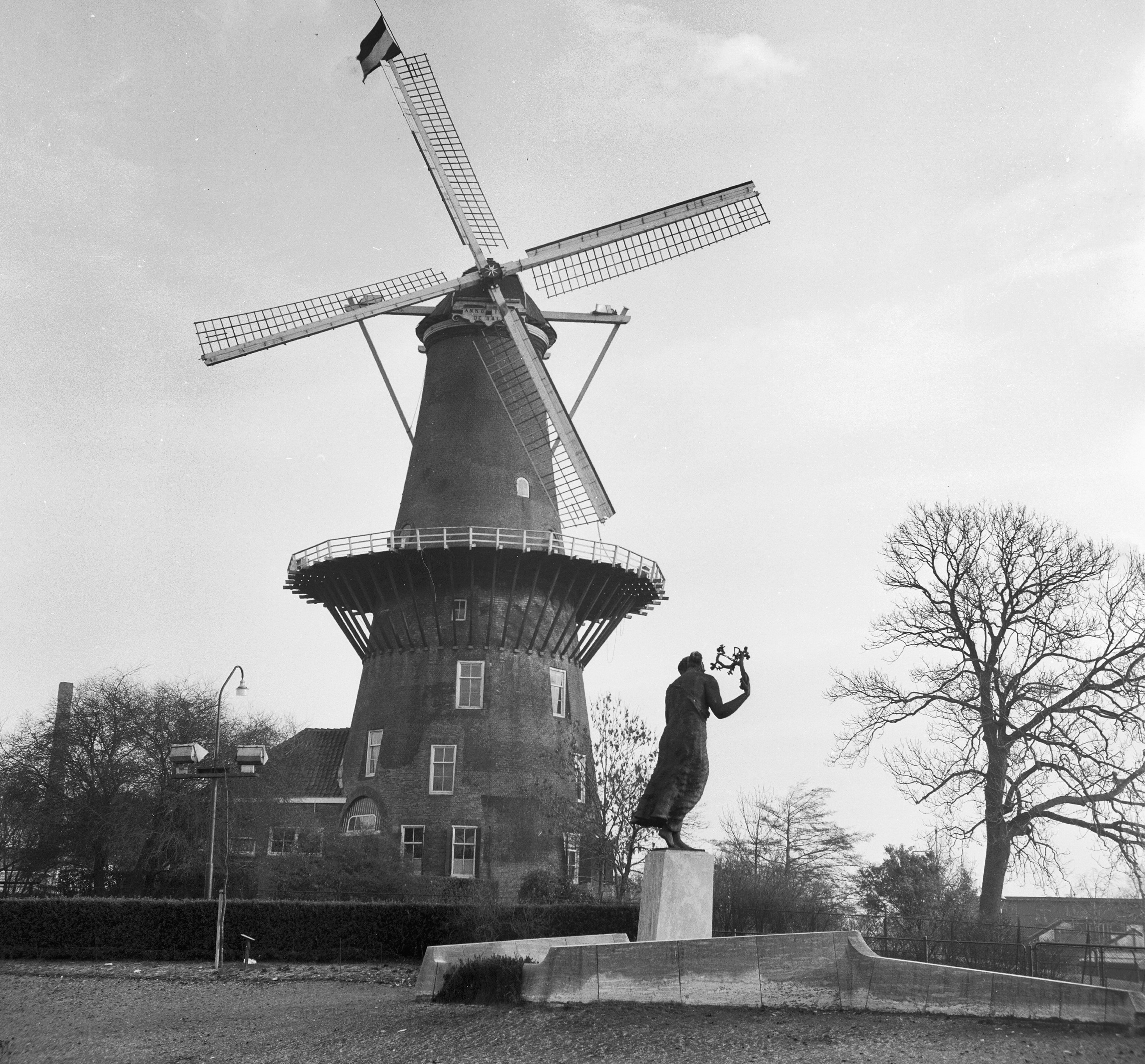
Sails at angle signalling mourning, at death of Queen Wilhelmina (1962)
