= Windlust, Achthuizen =

Dutch windmill

Windlust
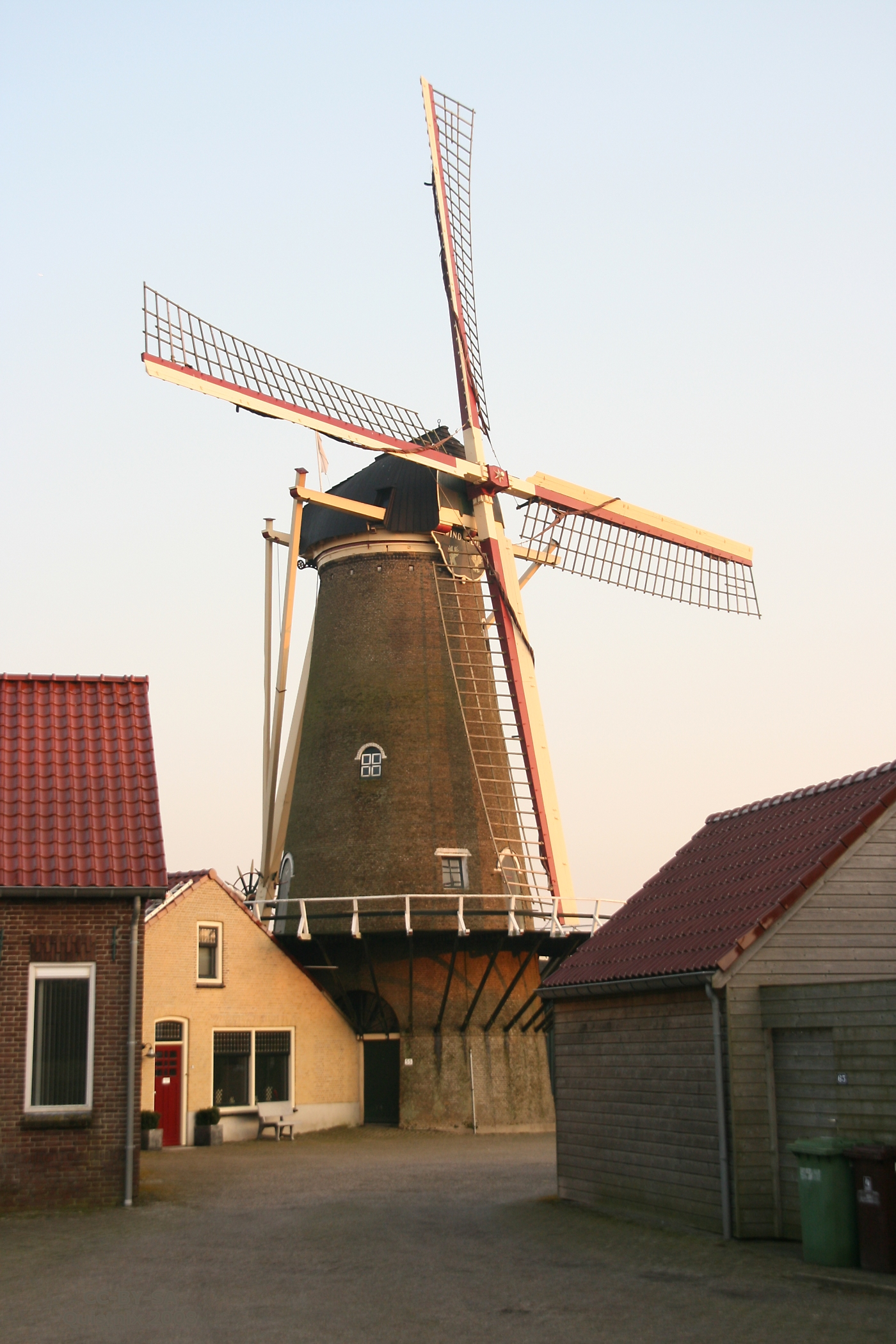
- Windlust

Origin
- Mill location: Achthuizen, Netherlands
- Coordinates: 51.688318°N 4.282211°E
- Operator(s): Goerre-Overflakkee Mill Foundation
- Year built: 1852 / 1981

Information
- Purpose: Flour grinding
- Type: Round stone mill
- No. of sails: 4
- Type of sails: Old Dutch 22.5 metres (74 ft)
- No. of pairs of millstones: 2

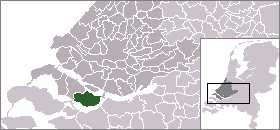
Location of Oostflakkee in the Netherlands

Windlust ("Wind love"), is a flour windmill in Achthuizen, Oostflakkee, South Holland, Netherlands.

== History ==
The mill was built by Dirk David van Dijk in 1852. From 1933 to 1991 the mill was owned by Van Reijen & Zn, a grain, feed and fertilizer merchant. The mill was shut down and fell into disrepair. It was dismantled around 1970. Starting about 1981 an extensive renovation began. Many problems were encountered, so the project took much longer than expected. The mill was purchased by the Goeree-Overflakkee Mill Foundation in 1991, and is now back in working order. It has two pairs of millstones, and is operated by volunteers.

== Gallery ==
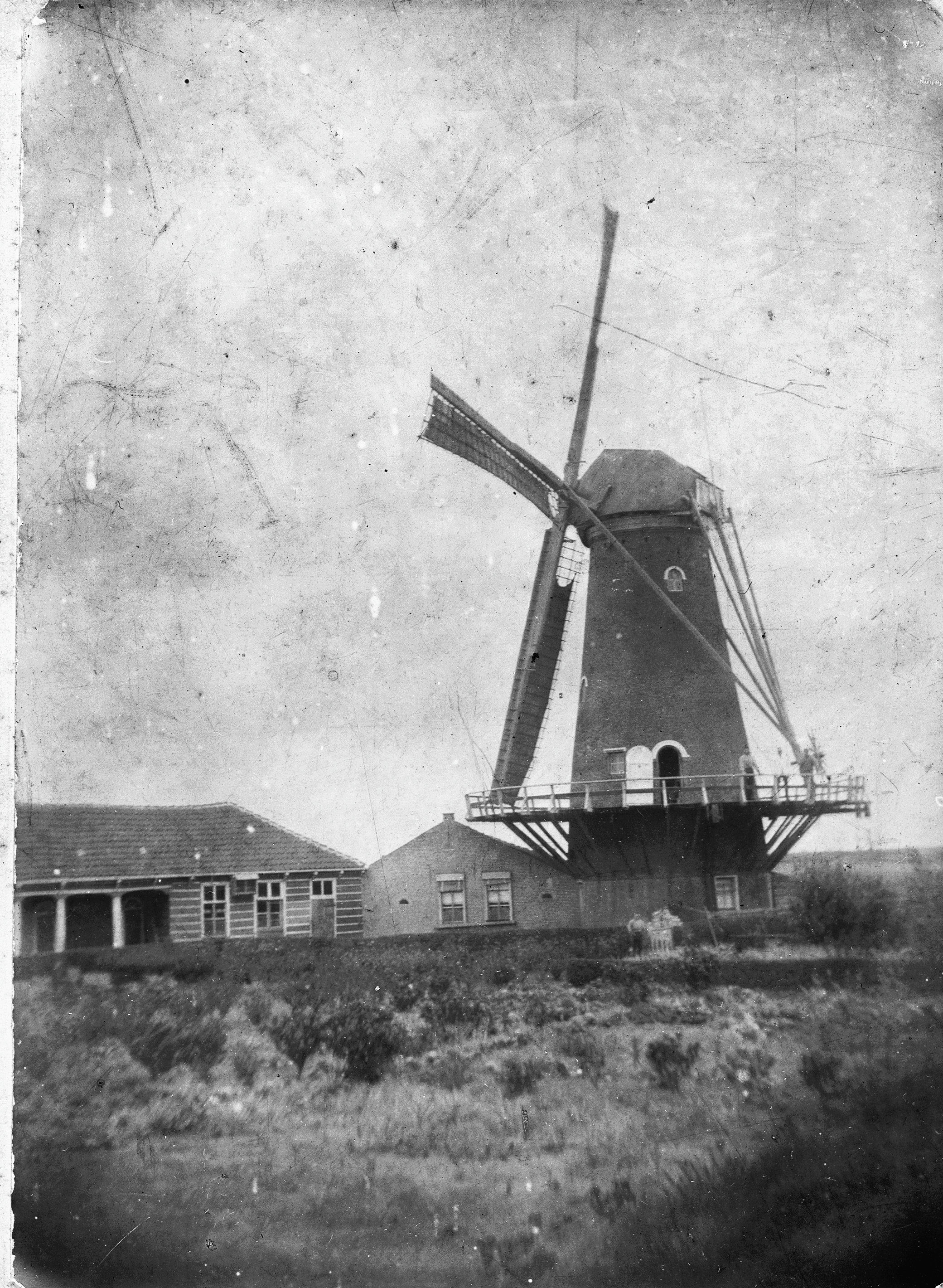
1905

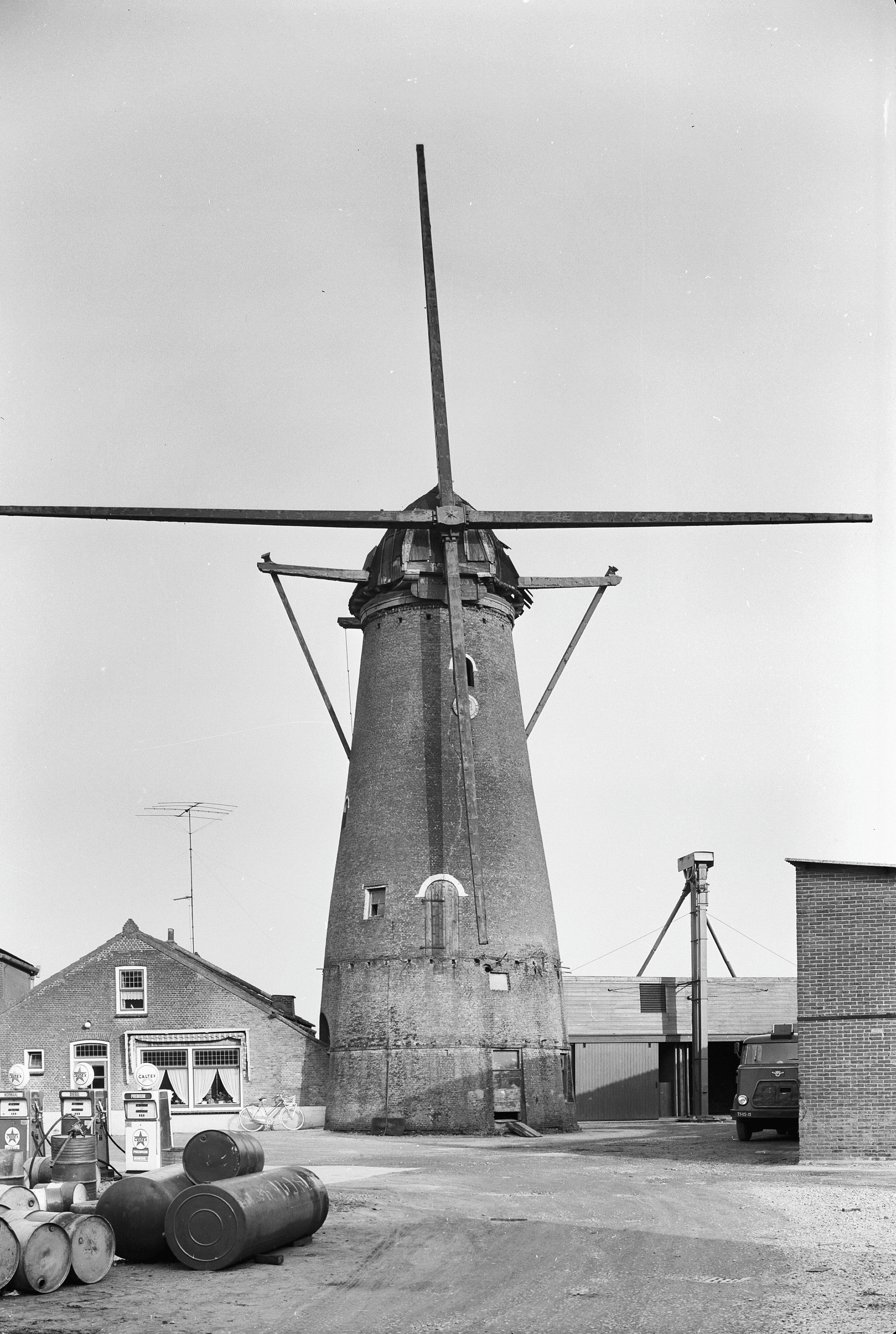
1968 - February

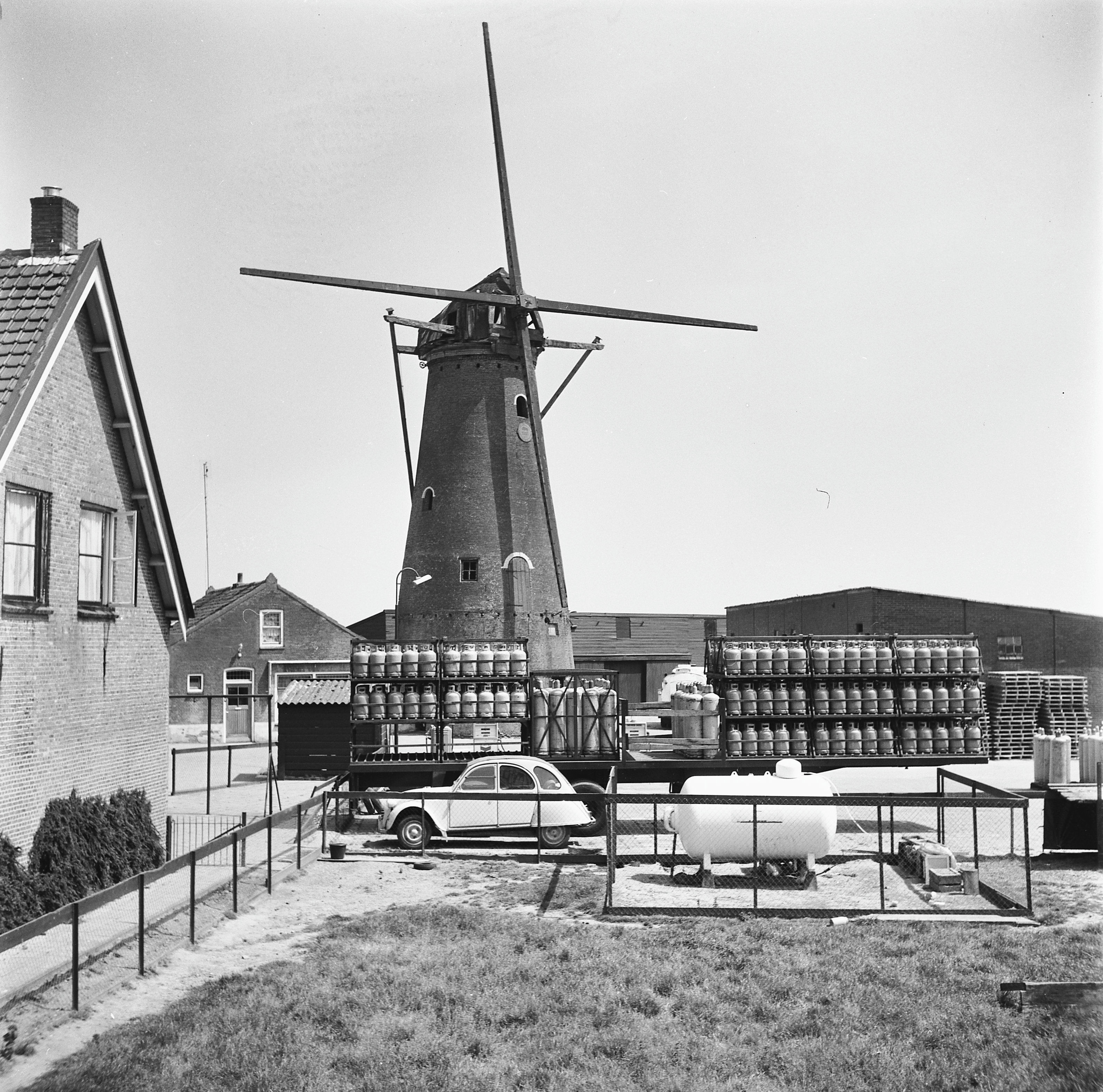
1975 - June

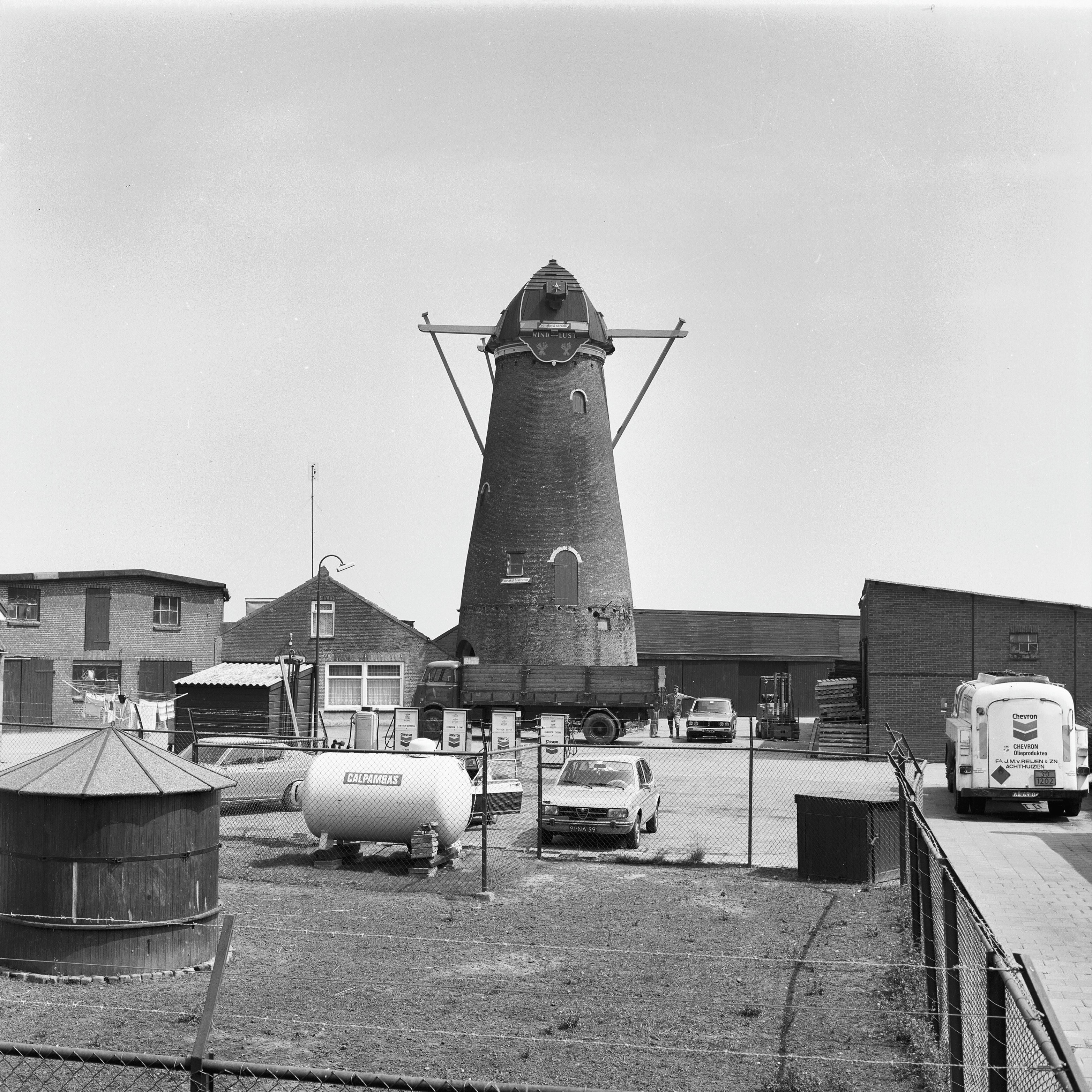
1980 - July

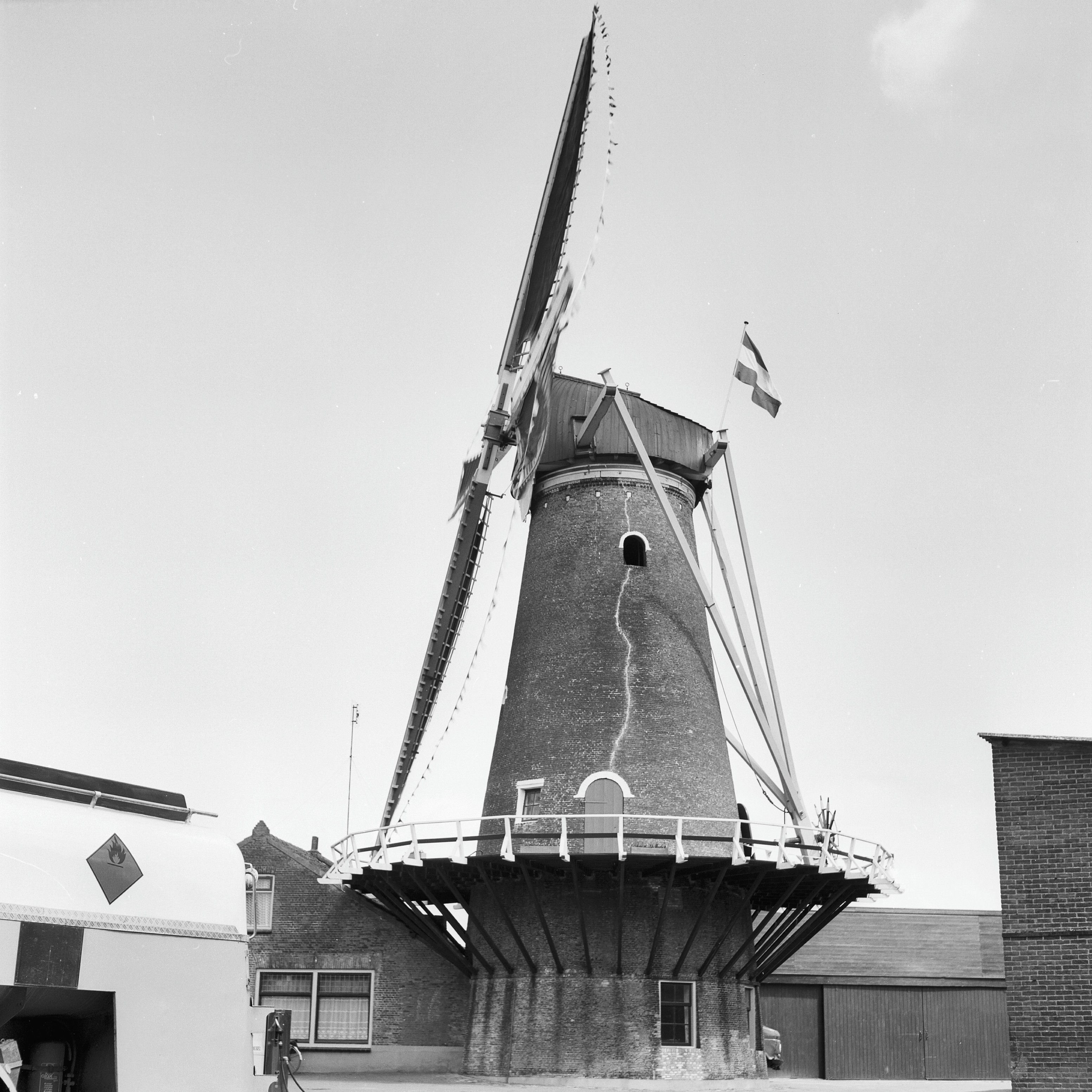
1982 - May

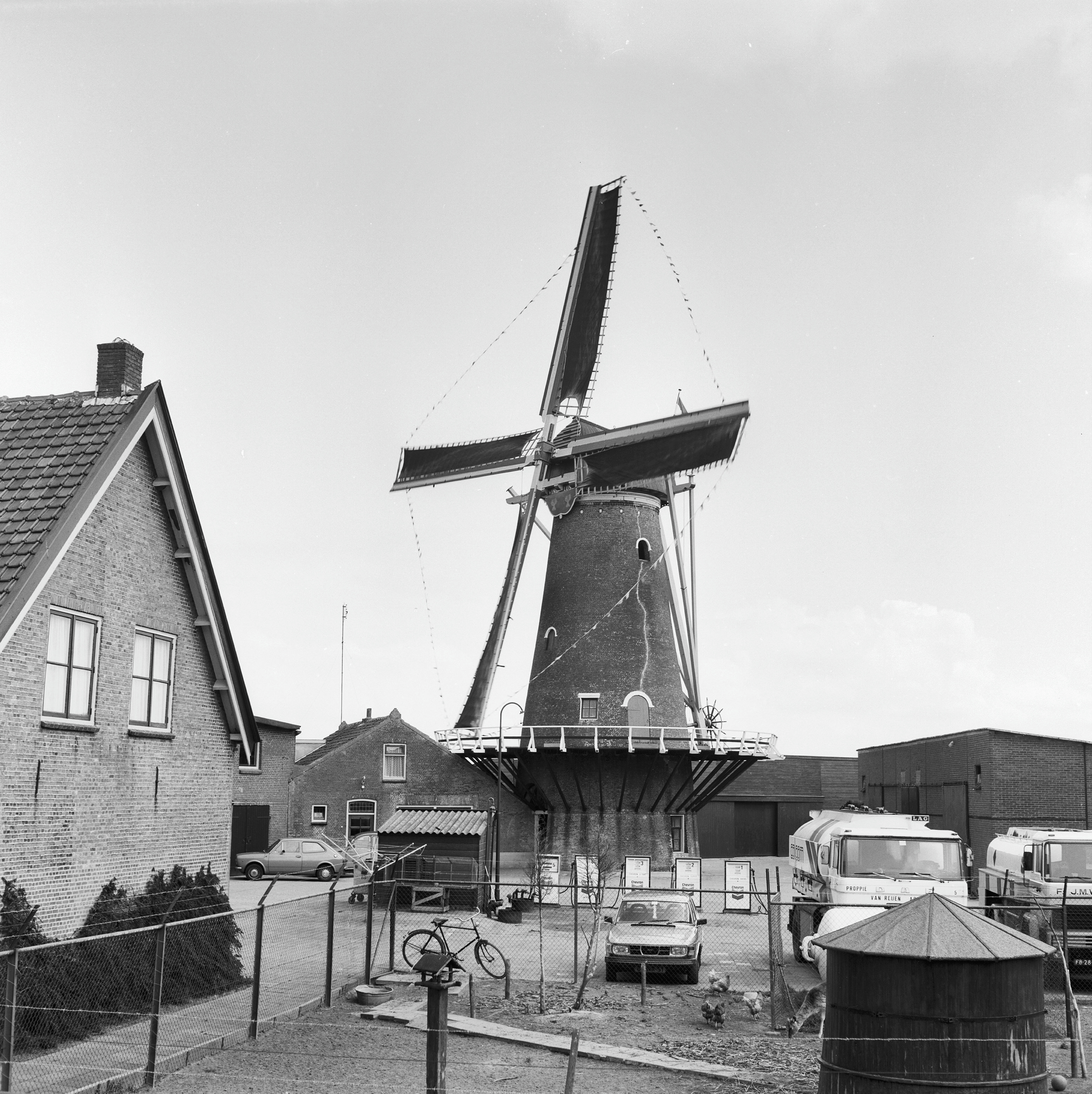
1982 - May

== Sources ==
- "Windlust (Achthuizen, Zuid-Holland)". Nederlandse Molendatabase.
