= Oostflakkee =

- Former municipality
- Flag Coat of arms

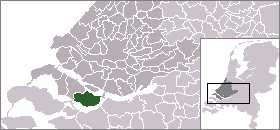
- Coordinates: 51.68°N 4.28°E
- Country: Netherlands
- Province: South Holland
- Municipality: Goeree-Overflakkee

Area
  - Total: 107.44 km^{2} (41.48 sq mi)
  - Land: 74.69 km^{2} (28.84 sq mi)
  - Water: 32.75 km^{2} (12.64 sq mi)

Population (1 January 2007)
  - Total: 10,163
  - Density: 136/km^{2} (350/sq mi)
- Source: CBS, Statline.
- Time zone: UTC+1 (CET)
  - Summer (DST): UTC+2 (CEST)
- Website: www.oostflakkee.nl

Oostflakkee (Dutch pronunciation: [ˌoːstflɑˈkeː]) is a former municipality on the island of Goeree-Overflakkee in the western Netherlands, in the province of South Holland. The former municipality covered an area of about 107 km^{2} (of which about 33 km^{2} was covered by water), and had a population of about 10,000 in 2007. On January 1, 2013, Oostflakkee merged with Goedereede, Dirksland, and Middelharnis into the new municipality of Goeree-Overflakkee.

The former municipality of Oostflakkee was formed by the amalgamation of the former municipalities of Den Bommel, Ooltgensplaat, and Oude Tonge in 1966. It consisted of the communities of Achthuizen, Langstraat, Den Bommel (with Zuidzijde), Ooltgensplaat, Oude-Tonge, and Zuidzijde.

Oude Tonge was the main town of this former municipality and has a considerable industrial area. It also has a large busstation. Den Bommel is quite similar as Stad aan 't Haringvliet with a harbor and beach on the shores of the Haringvliet. A few kilometers east of Den Bommel there is Zuidzijde, a very small town with a neat looking watertower. Ooltgensplaat is the most eastward town on the island with a harbor on the Volkerak. The town has a very old and beautiful municipal building. This town is the yearly start and finish of De Omloop - a 100+ km walk around the island in a 24-hour period. This event attracts thousands every year either participants or bystanders. It is held yearly in the latter half of August. Achthuizen and Langstraat are other small towns nearby Ooltgensplaat.

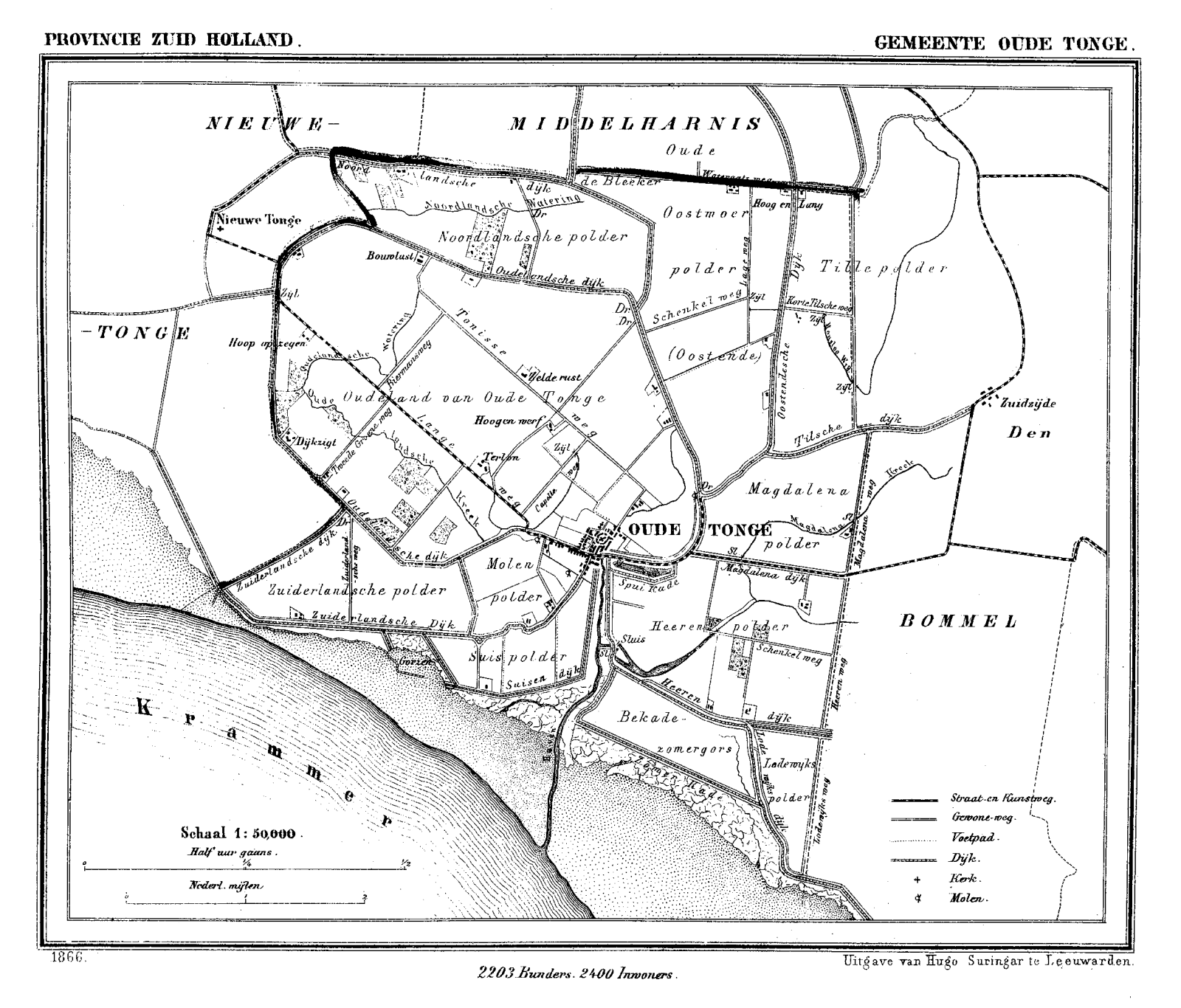
Oude Tonge in 1866.
