= Stad aan 't Haringvliet =

- Village
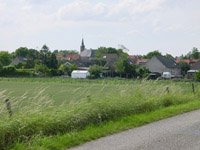
- Stad aan 't Haringvliet

- Location in the province of South Holland in the Netherlands Location in the Netherlands
- Coordinates: 51°44′N 4°15′E
- Country: Netherlands
- Province: South Holland
- Municipality: Goeree-Overflakkee

Area
  - Total: 10.01 km^{2} (3.86 sq mi)
- Elevation: 1.2 m (3.9 ft)

Population (2021)
  - Total: 1,488
  - Density: 148.7/km^{2} (385.0/sq mi)
- Time zone: UTC+1 (CET)
  - Summer (DST): UTC+2 (CEST)
- Postal code: 3243
- Dialing code: 0187
- Website: StadsWeb

Stad aan 't Haringvliet is a village in the Dutch province of South Holland. It is a part of the municipality of Goeree-Overflakkee, and lies about 12 km southeast of Hellevoetsluis. The name means City on the Haringvliet. From 1812 to 1817 it was part of the municipality of Den Bommel, then it was a separate municipality until 1966 when it was merged with Middelharnis. Last one has made part of the new municipality of Goeree-Overflakkee since 2013.

In 2001, the village of Stad aan 't Haringvliet had 1,068 inhabitants. The built-up area of the village was 0.23 km^{2}, and contained 425 residences. The slightly larger statistical area "Stad aan 't Haringvliet" has a population of around 1,340. On 1 January 2009 the village had 1,399 inhabitants.

Because of its location on the water, it is very suitable for aquatic sports. The street "Voorstraat" is painted by the Dutch painter Rien Poortvliet for his book Langs het tuinpad van mijn vaderen. This street also has the former town hall that ceased to be used as such in 1966 when the municipality Stad aan 't Haringvliet was merged. Other attractions are the Dutch Reformed church, the former doctors' house from 1876 and the windmill De Korenaar from 1746, which is still working.

Other places in the neighbourhood are:

- Nieuwe-Tonge
- Den Bommel
- Middelharnis
- Sommelsdijk

== Gallery ==
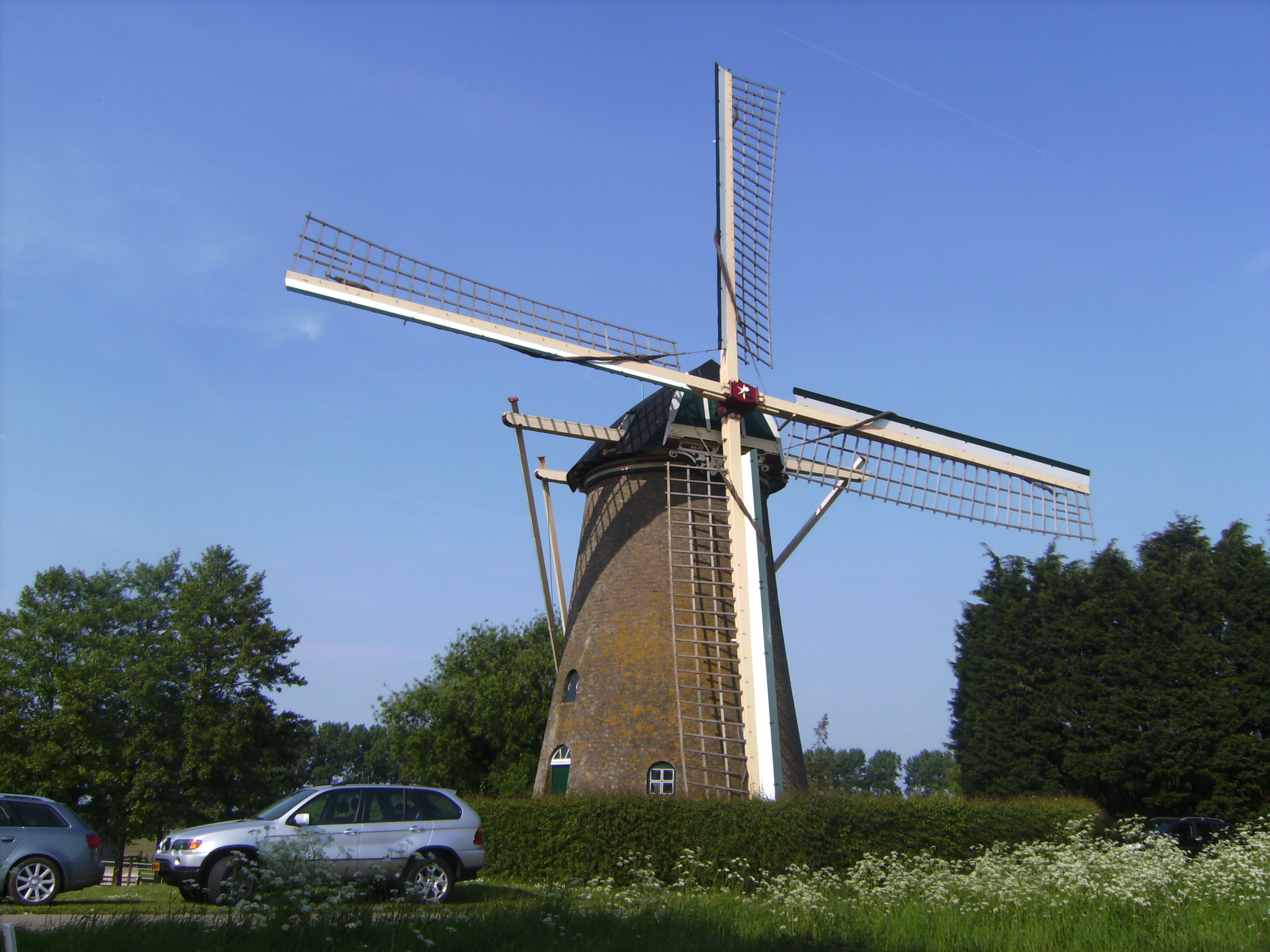
Stad aan 't Haringvliet, windmill De Korenaar

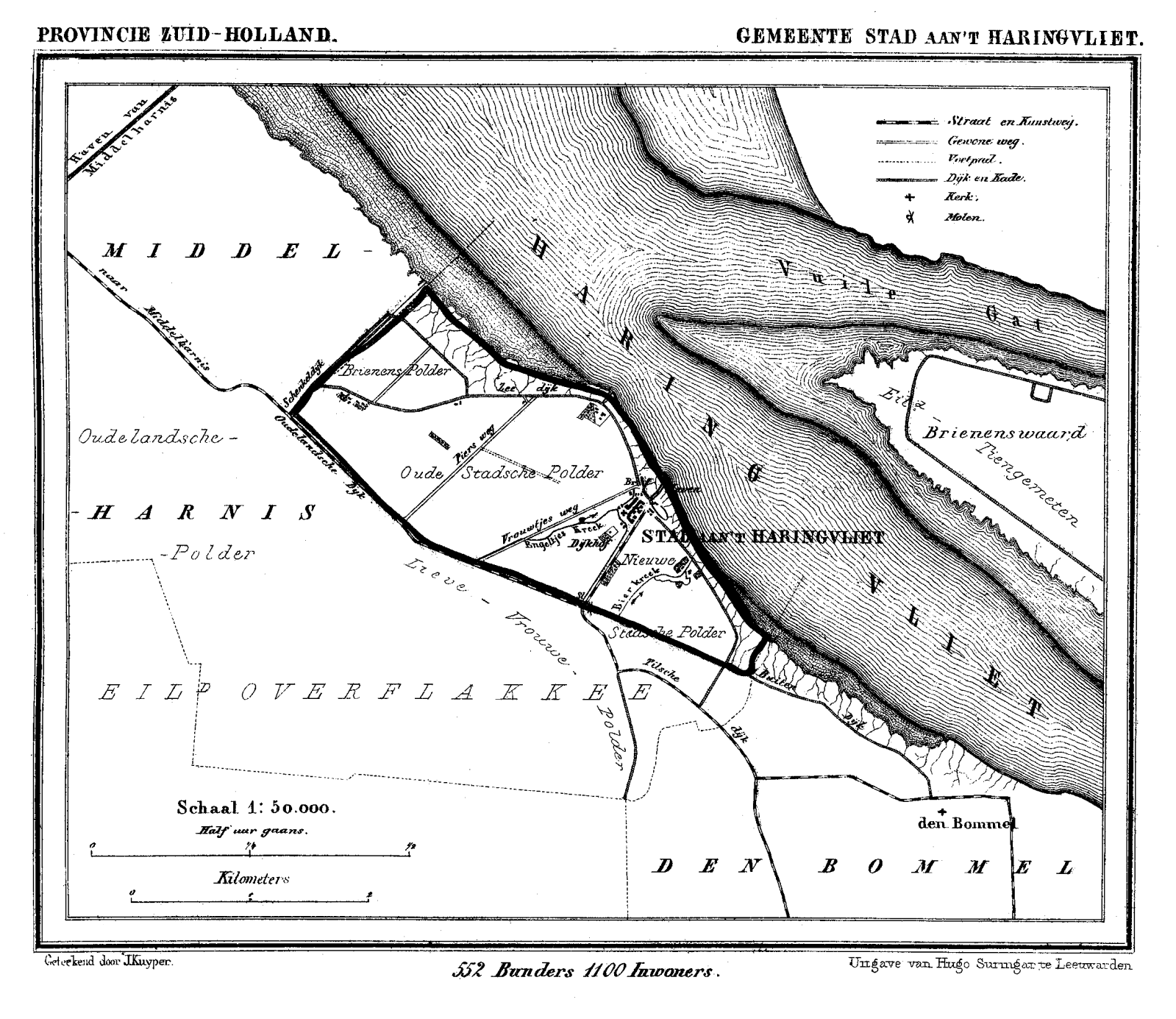
Map of the former municipality in 1868

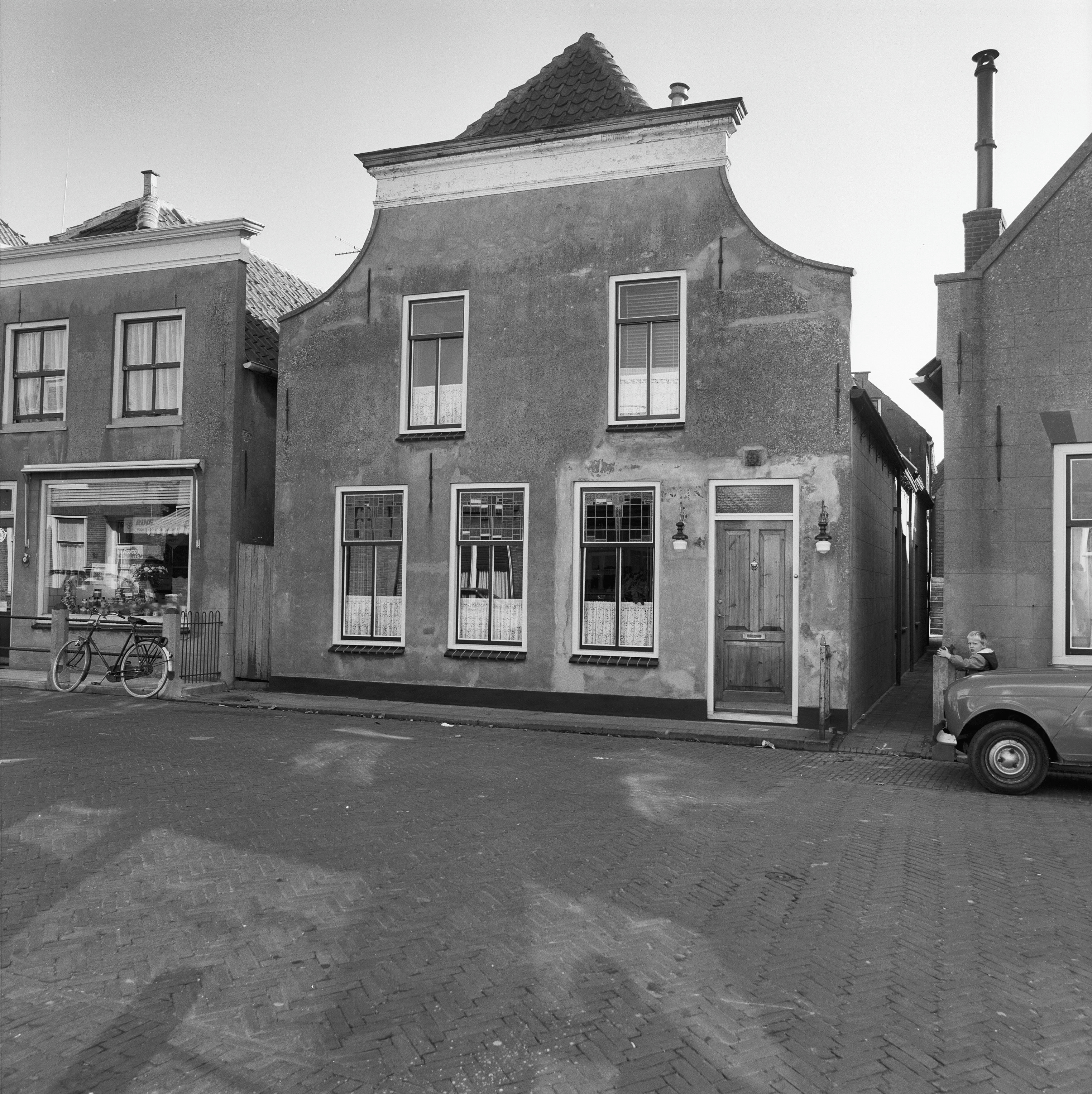
House in Stad aan 't Haringvliet
