= Battenoord =

- Hamlet
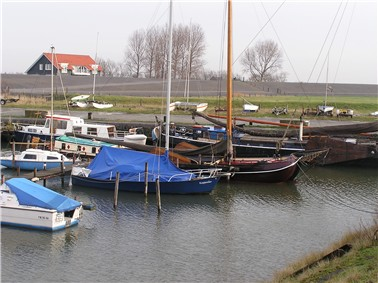
- Harbour of Battenoord

- Location in the province of South Holland in the Netherlands Location in the Netherlands
- Coordinates: 51.7064°N 4.1277°E
- Country: Netherlands
- Province: South Holland

Area
  - Total: 0.34 km^{2} (0.13 sq mi)
- Elevation: −1.5 m (−4.9 ft)

Population (2021)
  - Total: 65
  - Density: 190/km^{2} (500/sq mi)
- Time zone: UTC+1 (CET)
  - Summer (DST): UTC+2 (CEST)
- Postal code: 3244
- Dialing code: 0187

Battenoord is a hamlet in the Dutch province of South Holland. It is a part of the municipality of Goeree-Overflakkee. It lies near the village of Herkingen, and on the northside of the Grevelingenmeer.

The hamlet was first mentioned between 1420 and 1421 as Battenoert, and probably means "land (near water) of Batto (person)". It was originally a name of a shoal.

In 1504, the harbour of Nieuwe-Tonge was relocated to Battenoord. The hamlet was severely affected by the North Sea flood of 1953 and in and around Battenoord 55 people lost their lives.

Battenoord is considered part of Nieuwe-Tonge. It has place name signs. Battenoord is the winter home of a group flamingoes between c. October until c. April.
