= Zuidzijde, Goeree-Overflakkee =

Zuidzijde
- Hamlet
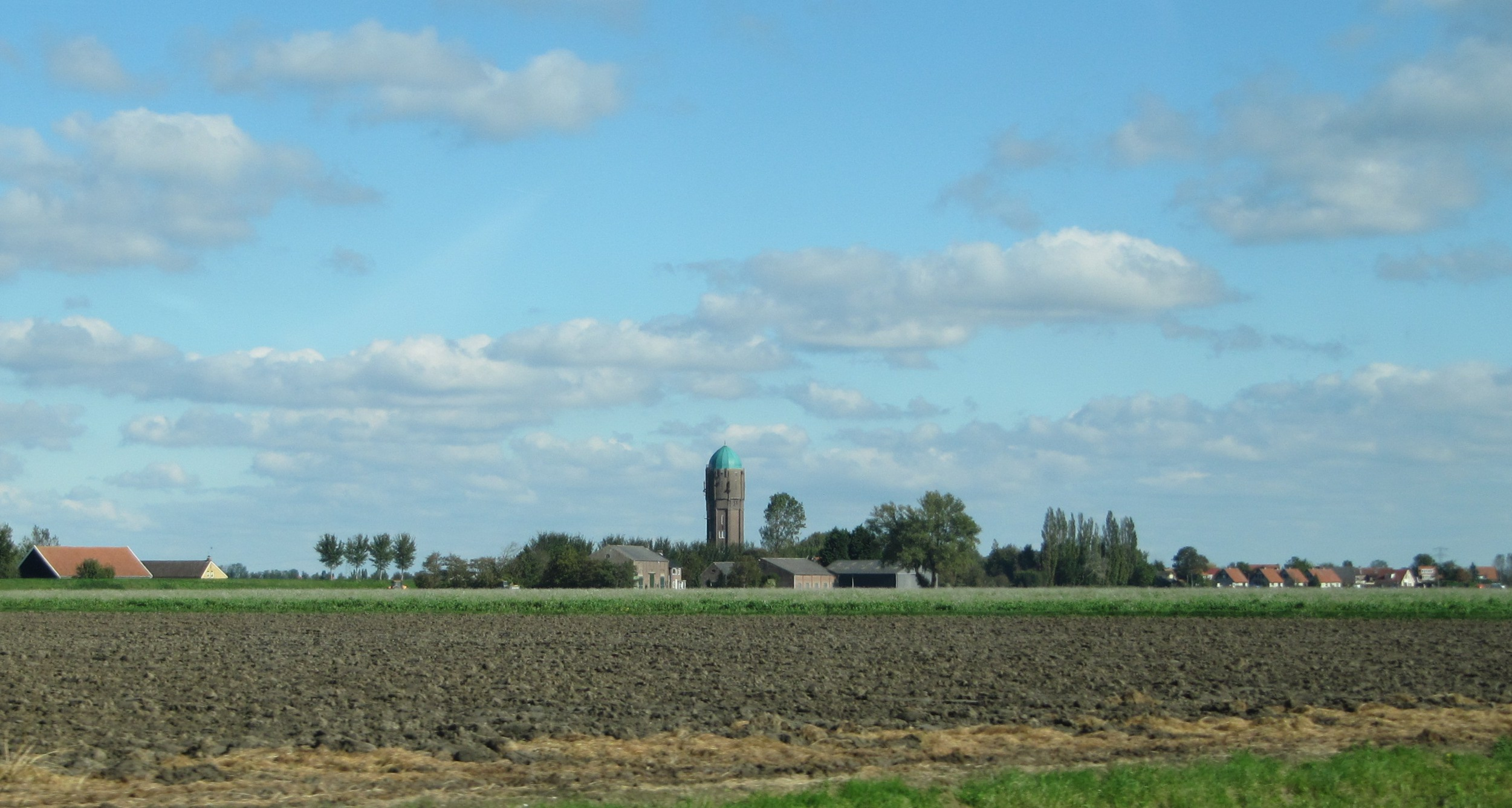
- Zuidzijde with water tower

- Location in the province of South Holland in the Netherlands Location in the Netherlands
- Coordinates: 51.7014°N 4.2575°E
- Country: Netherlands
- Province: South Holland
- Municipality: Goeree-Overflakkee

Zuidzijde is a hamlet in the Dutch province of South Holland. It is a part of the municipality of Goeree-Overflakkee. It lies south of the village of Den Bommel.

Zuidzijde is not a statistical entity, and considered part of Den Bommel. It has place name signs and consists of about 70 houses.

The water tower is no longer in service but can still be seen from afar. It is nowadays used as a residential home. Another landmark is farmhouse De Lage Werf, one of the oldest buildings on the island which dates back to around 1640, when it was originally built as a country house.
