= Watersnoodmonument =

1961 memorial in Nieuwe-Tonge, South Holland

Coordinates: 51°38′52″N 4°0′2″E

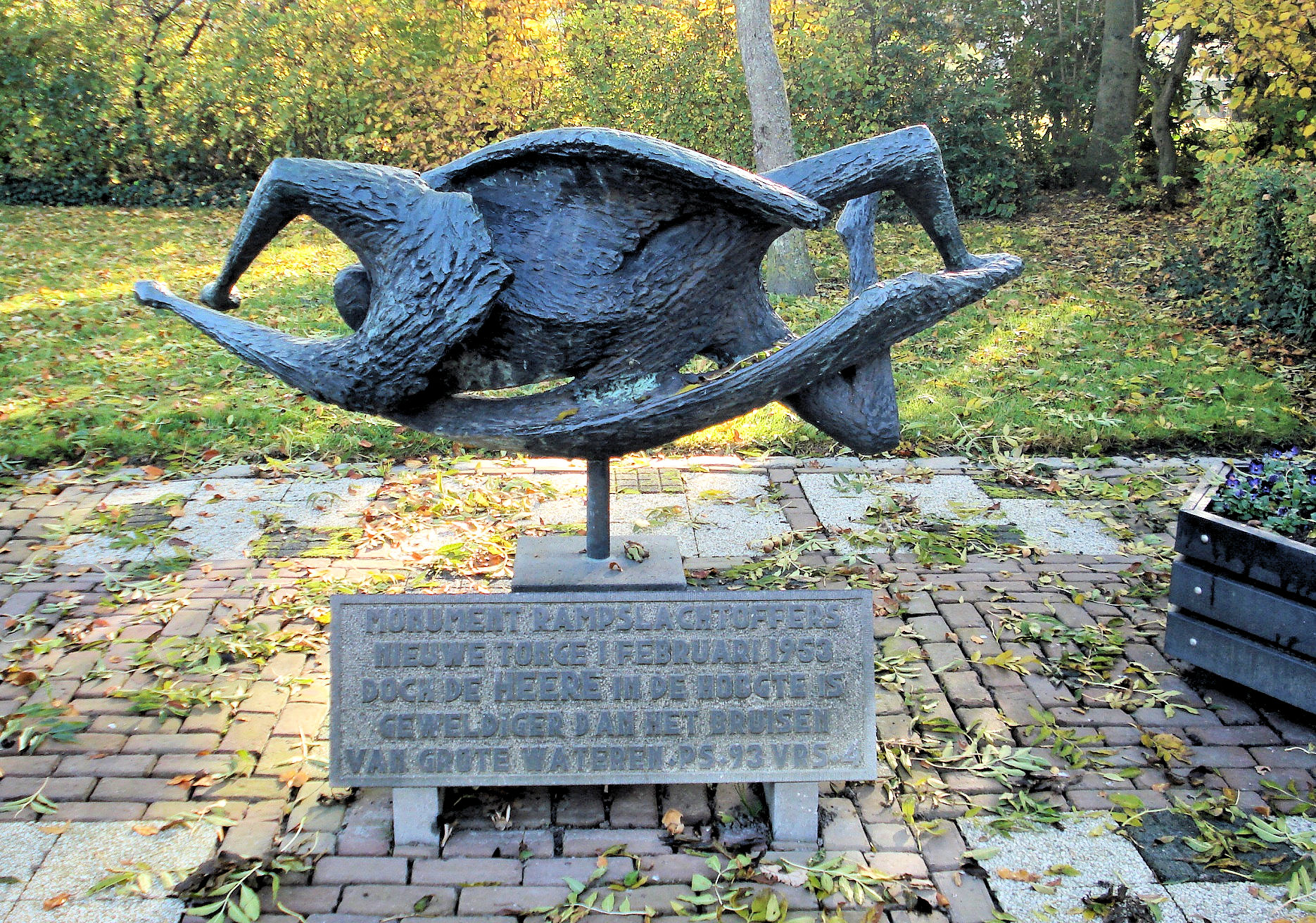
- Artist: Hans Petri
- Year: 1961
- Medium: Bronze
- Dimensions: 200 cm (79 in)
- Location: Nieuwe-Tonge

The Watersnoodmonument (1961), also known as The Drowning Man, is a memorial in the Dutch village of Nieuwe-Tonge, in the province of South Holland.

== Background ==
On the night of January 31 to February 1, 1953, a flood disaster occurred, killing 1,836 people in the Netherlands and destroying most of the houses in Nieuwe-Tonge. Later that year, the local branch of the Netherlands Red Cross initiated the erection of a monument for the victims. The Dordrecht sculptor Hans Petri was commissioned by the founding committee, chaired by Mayor Christiaan van Hofwegen, to create a design. In early 1955, during a commemorative ceremony in the village hall, Petri presented his design of a man and woman sitting on the roof of their destroyed house. It was to be placed on the Battenoordsedijk.

Due to the planned placement in the open space by the dike, it was decided to execute Petri's design in a larger format. However, fundraising efforts fell short, leading Petri to create a new design in 1960. He proposed a stylized drowning man struggling in the waves. This design was executed and cast in bronze by Binder. The inscription on a stone in front of the sculpture references the Psalm text that was scheduled to be read on February 1, 1953, in the Reformed Church of Nieuwe-Tonge.

The Watersnoodmonument was placed on Finlandplein and unveiled on May 26, 1961, by the South Holland Commissioner of the King, Jan Klaasesz, in the presence of acting Mayor Cornelis Nieuwenhuizen and former Mayor Van Hofwegen.

== Description ==
The monument consists of a reclining bronze male figure amid waves, placed on a concrete pedestal.

In front of the pedestal is a stone with the inscription:

MONUMENT TO THE DISASTER VICTIMS
NIEUWE TONGE FEBRUARY 1, 1953
BUT THE LORD ON HIGH IS
MIGHTIER THAN THE NOISE
OF MANY WATERS. PS. 93:4
