= Jurian Hobbel =

Dutch footballer (born 2000)

Personal information
- Date of birth: 12 February 2000 (age 26)
- Place of birth: Nieuwe-Tonge, Netherlands
- Height: 1.83 m (6 ft 0 in)
- Position: Right-back

Team information
- Current team: De Jonge Spartaan

Youth career
- –2007: NTVV
- 2007–2017: Sparta
- 2017–2020: Dordrecht

Senior career*
Years	Team	Apps	(Gls)
2020–2022	Dordrecht	33	(0)
2022–2023	SteDoCo	15	(0)
2024–2025	DVV '09		
2025–	De Jonge Spartaan		
- * Club domestic league appearances and goals as of 3 March 2023

Jurian Hobbel (born 12 February 2000) is a Dutch footballer who plays as a right-back for amateur side De Jonge Spartaan.

== Club career ==
Hobbel started his career with Sparta Rotterdam, before moving to the FC Dordrecht academy on a free transfer in 2017. He made his senior debut three years later, playing the full 90 minutes in a 2–0 home win against AZ Alkmaar II.

On 2 May 2022, Hobbel joined SteDoCo competing in the fourth-tier Derde Divisie. He later joined De Jonge Spartaan from DVV '09.
