= Oude-Tonge =

- Village
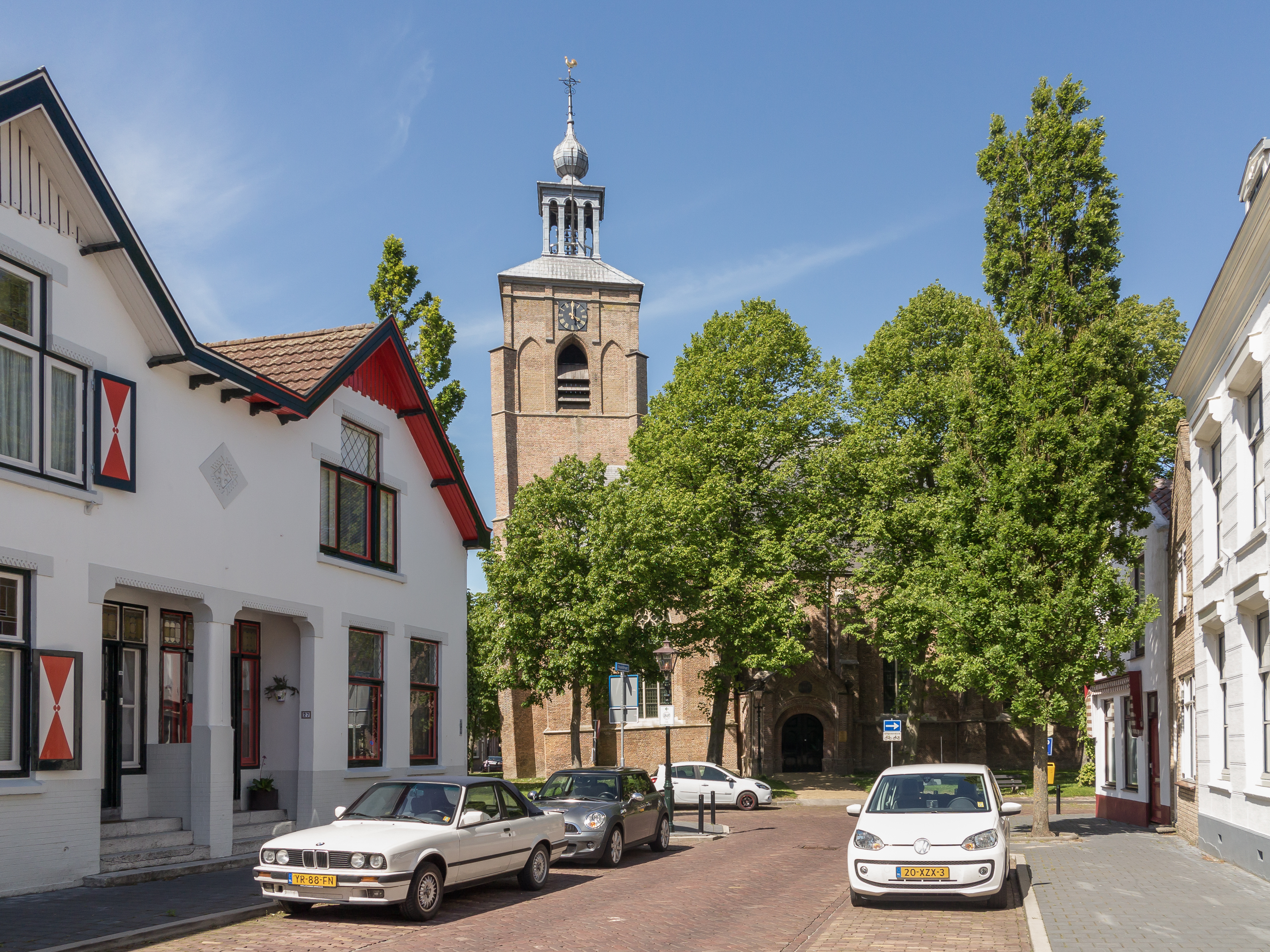

- Location in the province of South Holland in the Netherlands Location in the Netherlands
- Coordinates: 51.6909725°N 4.2126986°E
- Country: Netherlands
- Province: South Holland
- Municipality: Goeree-Overflakkee

Area
  - Total: 24.65 km^{2} (9.52 sq mi)
- Elevation: 0.4 m (1.3 ft)

Population (2023)
  - Total: 5,295
  - Density: 214.8/km^{2} (556.3/sq mi)
- Time zone: UTC+1 (CET)
  - Summer (DST): UTC+2 (CEST)
- Postal code: 3255
- Dialing code: 0187

Oude-Tonge (also Oudetonge) is a village in the Dutch province of South Holland. It is a part of the municipality of Goeree-Overflakkee, and lies about 16 km south of Hellevoetsluis.

== History ==
The village was first mentioned in 1420 or 1421 as "die Tonghe". The current name means "old headland". Oude (old) has been added to distinguish from Nieuwe-Tonge. Oude-Tonge developed after Het Oudland polder was created in 1438. It is located in the heerlijkheid Grijsoord which was flooded in the 13th century. In 1647, the village burnt down. The harbour was connected to a canal after the Aymon-Louisepolder was created in 1856.

The Dutch Reformed church is a double aisled church from the late 15th century. The tower was constructed in the early 16th century. It used to have an onion shaped spire, but it was removed during the 1812 restoration. The Catholic Assumption of Mary Church is a three aisled basilica-like church which was built between 1896 and 1897, and designed by Joseph Cuypers.

Oude-Tonge was home to 2,263 people in 1840. The village was severely affected by the North Sea flood of 1953. Oude-Tonge was a separate municipality until 1966, when it became part of Oostflakkee. In 2013, it became part of the municipality of Goeree-Overflakkee.

== Gallery ==
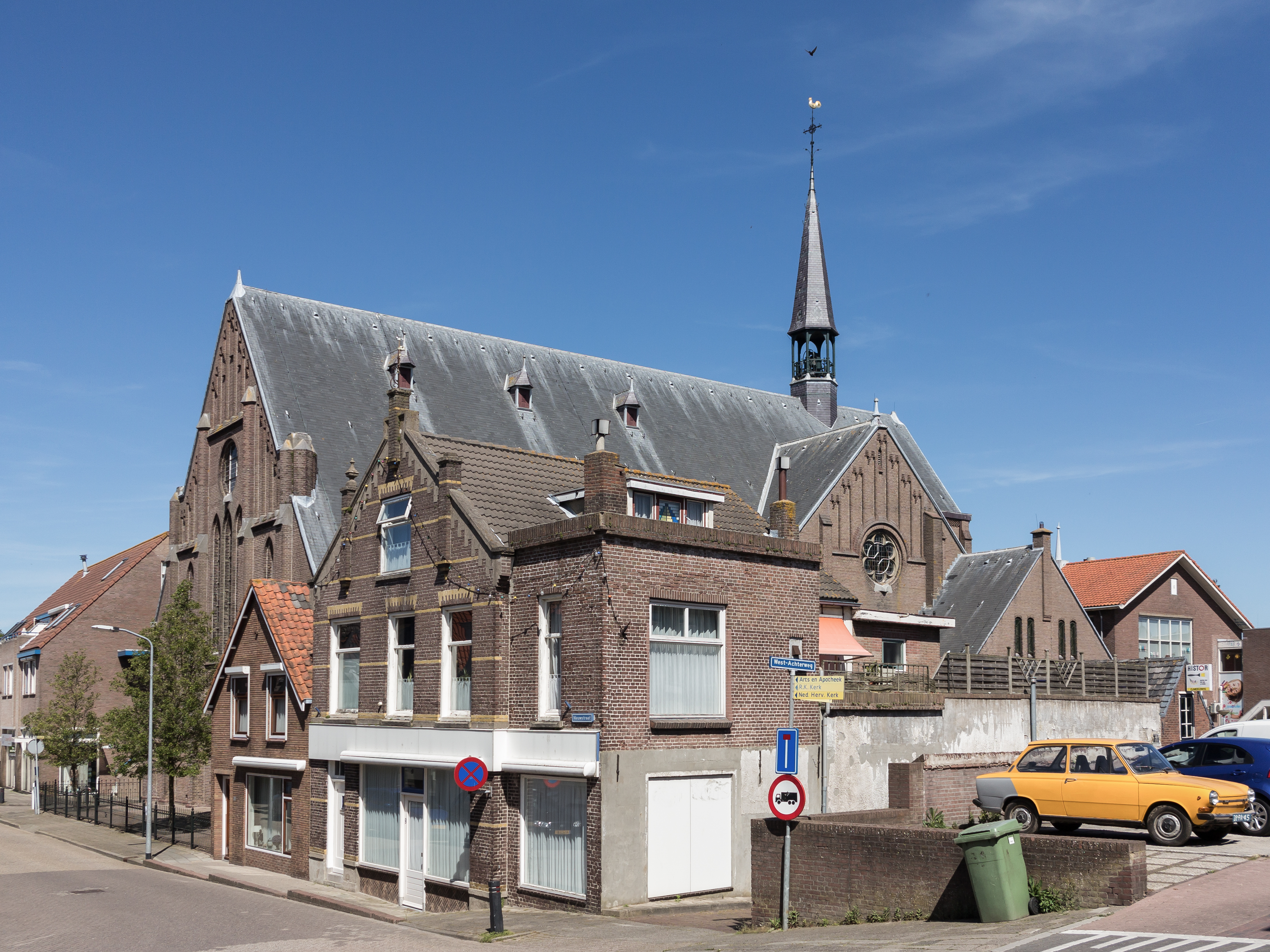
Catholic church: de kerk OLV Hemelvaart

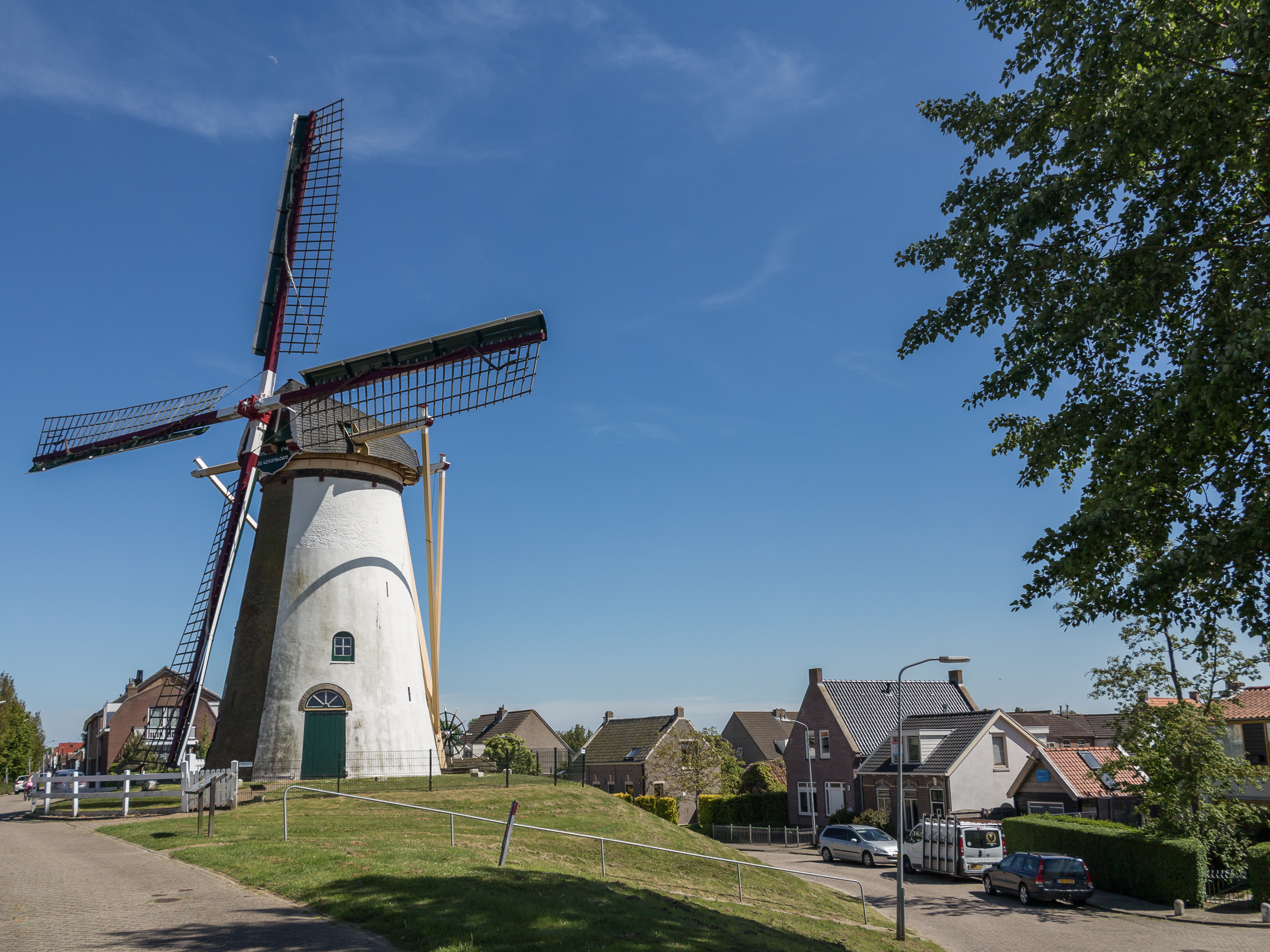
Windmill: korenmolen de Korenbloem

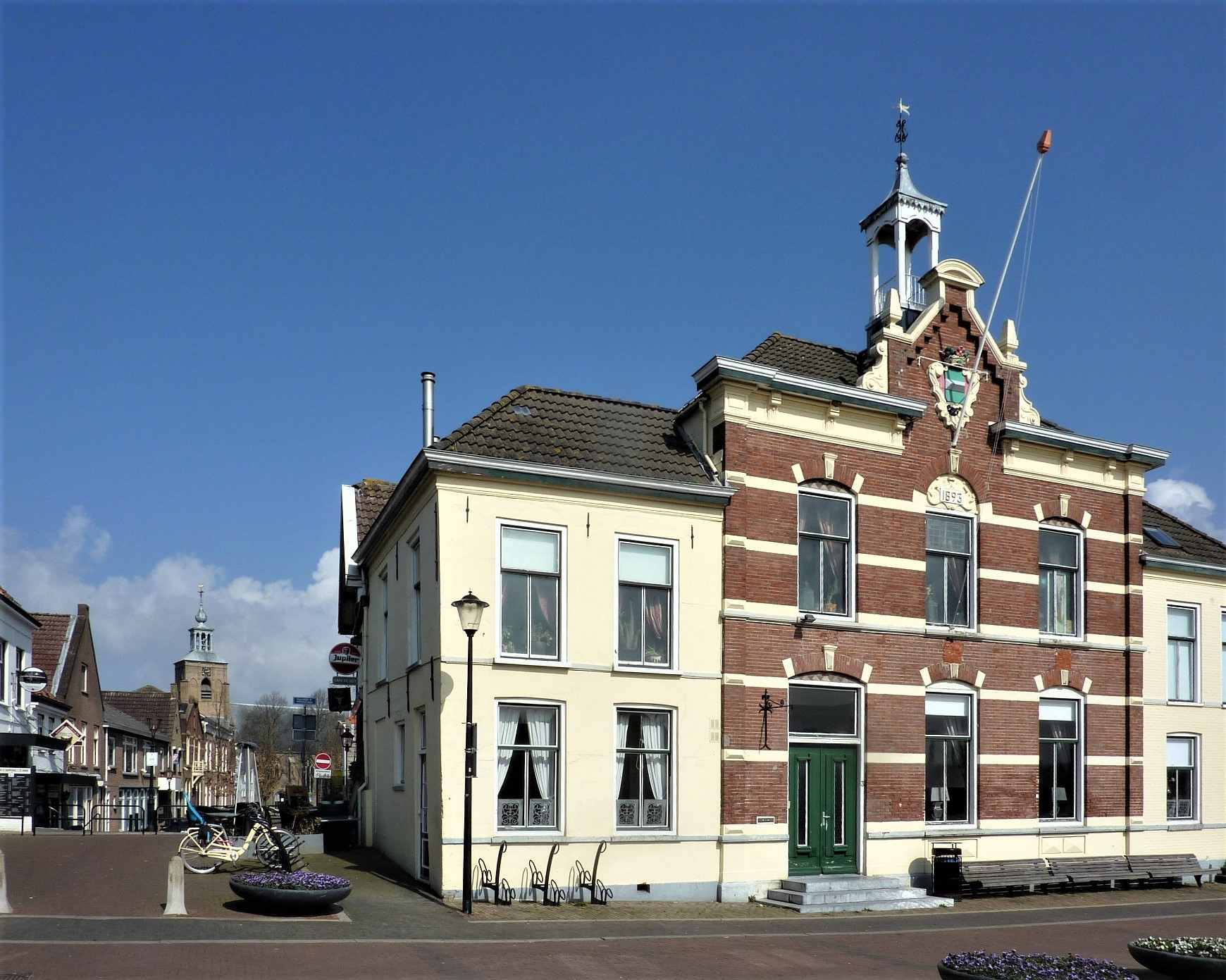
Street view with former town hall

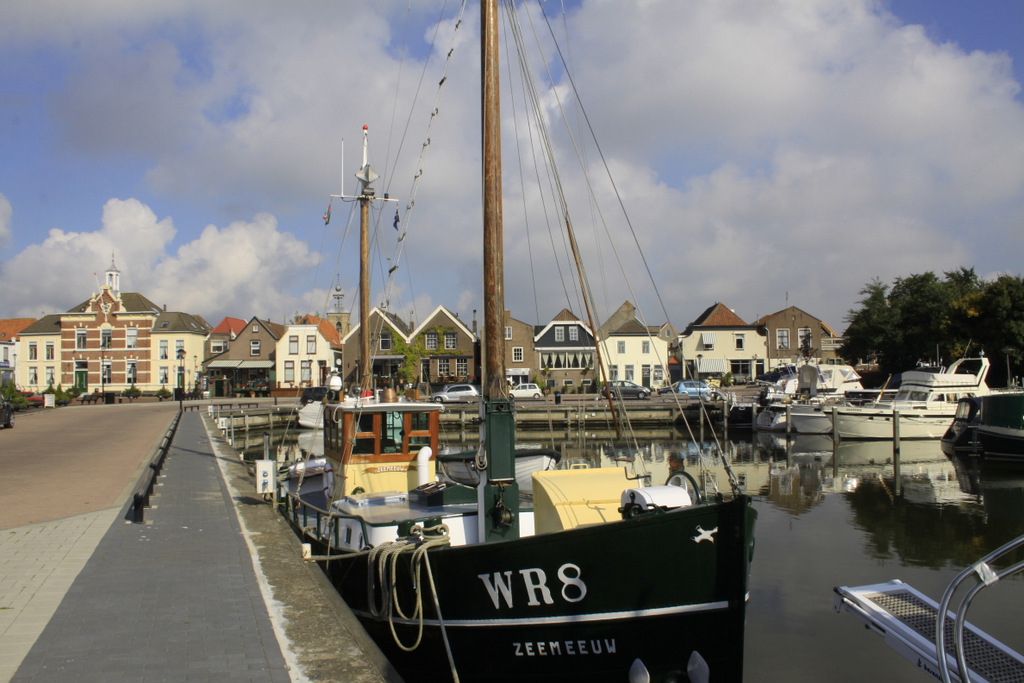
Harbour of Oude-Tonge
