= Dirksland =

- Village
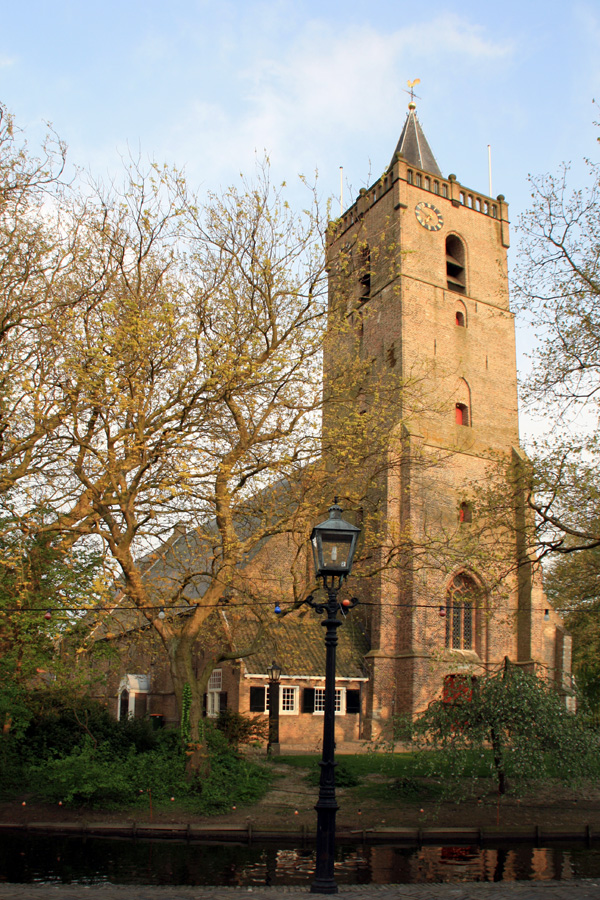
- Dutch Reformed Church

- Flag Coat of arms

- Location in the province of South Holland in the Netherlands Location in the Netherlands
- Coordinates: 51.75°N 4.10°E
- Country: Netherlands
- Province: South Holland
- Municipality: Goeree-Overflakkee

Area
  - Total: 29.34 km^{2} (11.33 sq mi)
- Elevation: 0.8 m (2.6 ft)

Population (2021)
  - Total: 5,930
  - Density: 202/km^{2} (523/sq mi)
- Time zone: UTC+1 (CET)
  - Summer (DST): UTC+2 (CEST)
- Postal code: 3247
- Dialing code: 0187

Dirksland (Dutch pronunciation: [ˈdɪr(ə)kslɑnt]) is a village and former municipality on Goeree-Overflakkee Island in the western Netherlands, in the province of South Holland. The former municipality had a population of about 8,000 in 2007, and covered an area of about 74 km^{2} of which about 19 km^{2} was water. The former municipality of Dirksland also included the communities of Herkingen, and Melissant. On 1 January 2013, Dirksland merged with Goedereede, Middelharnis, and Oostflakkee into the new municipality of Goeree-Overflakkee.

The North Sea flood of 1953 did not have as much of a destructive effect on Dirksland as the rest of the island, because Dirksland is somewhat higher. Dirksland is the largest of the three communities within the former municipality and also has the only hospital on Goeree-Overflakkee island. The Van Weel-Bethesda Hospital is one of the smallest in the country. Dirksland can be recognized from a distance by the tallest water tower in the country. The towns are agriculturally focused and have several campgrounds for people who prefer a bit of rest over the busy Ouddorp area but still want to be close to shore. Dirksland has an inland harbor with a newly restored gate complex.

== Gallery ==
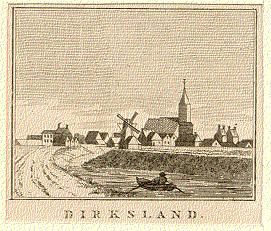
Engraving of Dirksland, ca. 1780.

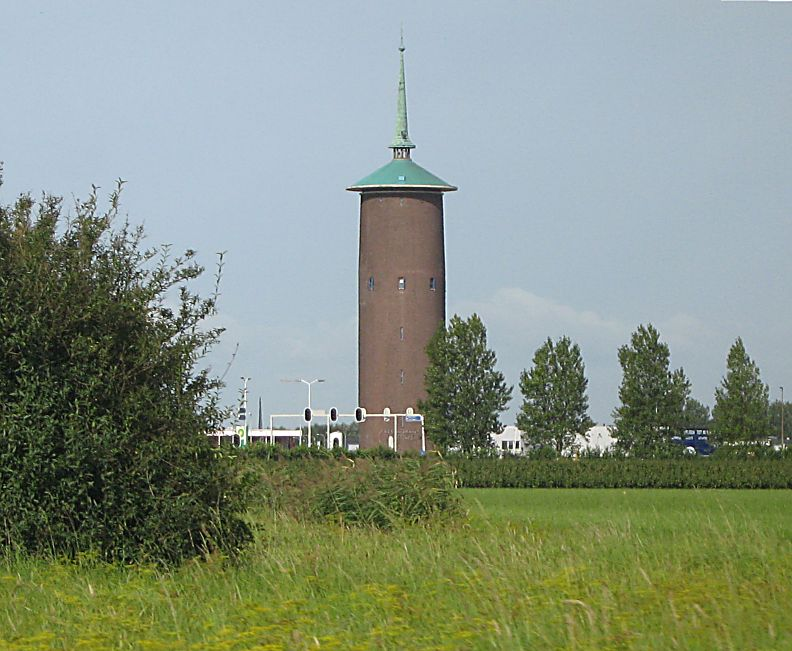
The water tower of Dirksland.

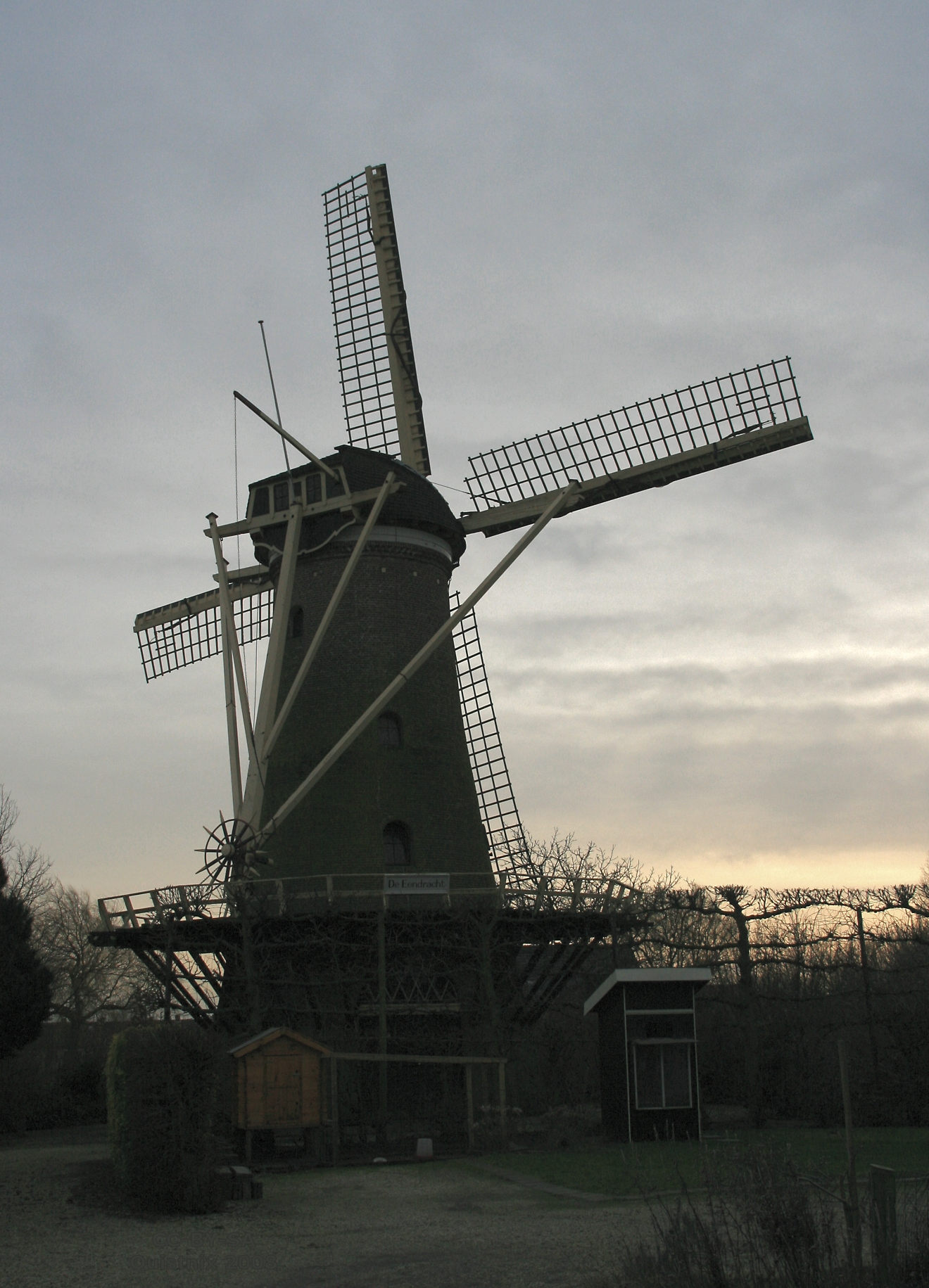
Windmill "De Eendracht" in Dirksland
