= Langstraat =

- Hamlet
- Location in the province of South Holland in the Netherlands Location in the Netherlands
- Coordinates: 51.6764°N 4.2803°E
- Country: Netherlands
- Province: South Holland
- Municipality: Goeree-Overflakkee

Langstraat is a hamlet in the Dutch province of South Holland. It is a part of the municipality of Goeree-Overflakkee. It lies near the village of Achthuizen.

The hamlet was first mentioned in 1899 as Langstraat, and means "long street". Between 1903 and 1922, a temporary church was established in two houses. In 1922, a real church was built and the temporary church was reconstructed in two houses again.

Langstraat is considered part of Achthuizen. It has place name signs, and consists of about 70 houses.
