= Herkingen =

- Village
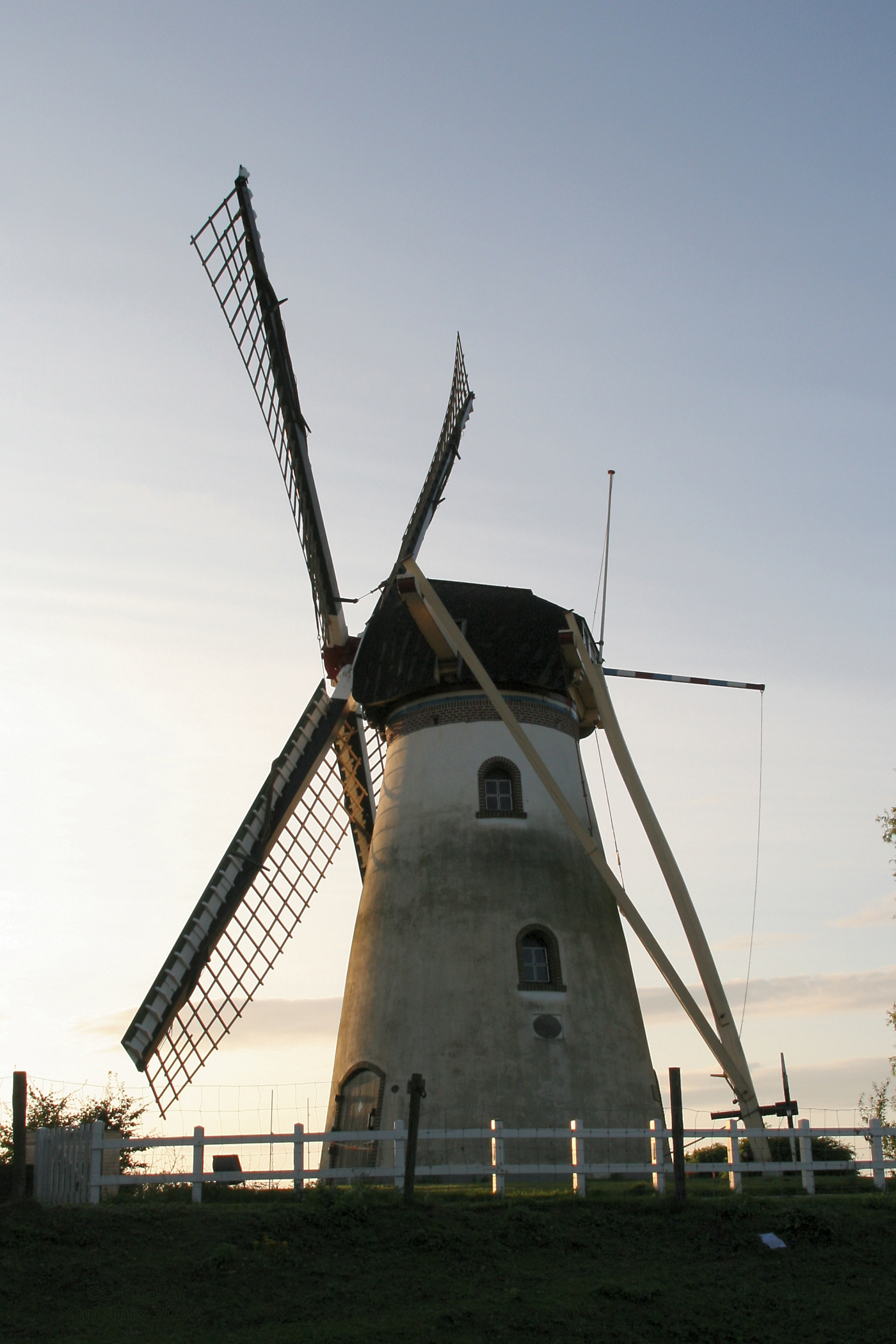
- Windmill De Dankbaarheid

- Location in the province of South Holland in the Netherlands Location in the Netherlands
- Coordinates: 51°42′36″N 4°5′14″E
- Country: Netherlands
- Province: South Holland
- Municipality: Goeree-Overflakkee

Area
  - Total: 9.71 km^{2} (3.75 sq mi)
- Elevation: 0.8 m (2.6 ft)

Population (2021)
  - Total: 1,250
  - Density: 129/km^{2} (333/sq mi)
- Time zone: UTC+1 (CET)
  - Summer (DST): UTC+2 (CEST)
- Postal code: 3249
- Dialing code: 0187

Herkingen is a village in the Dutch province of South Holland. It is located on the south coast of the island Goeree-Overflakkee, in the municipality of Goeree-Overflakkee.

== History ==
Herkingen was first mentioned in 1420 or 1421 as "Herkinghe", and means "settlement of Herke (person)". Herkingen is a dike village which developed after the Oud-Herkingen polder was created in 1483. In 1511, it was flooded and a new dike was constructed around the village in 1604.

The Dutch Reformed church is a modest aisleless church parallel to the dike which was constructed in 1788. The grist mill De Dankbaarheid was built in 1841. It was in service until 1960, and in 1966, it was used as a holiday home. It was restored in the 1990s, and operational in 2000. The windmill is frequently in service on a voluntary basis.

Herkingen was home to 628 people in 1840. Herkingen was severely damaged during the North Sea flood of 1953.

Herkingen was a separate municipality between 1817 and 1966, when it merged with Dirksland. In 2013, it became part of the municipality of Goeree-Overflakkee.

== Overview ==
Herkingen lies on the south side of the island and borders the Grevelingenmeer, which is a saltwater lake that has been disconnected directly from the North Sea by the Brouwersdam, but still connects to the Oosterschelde which is saltwater. The Grevelingenmeer has quite a large size yachting marina and is a large water sports area with the main recreational areas on Schouwen-Duiveland. The town of Herkingen currently hosts several of the largest modern windmills in the country.

== Gallery ==
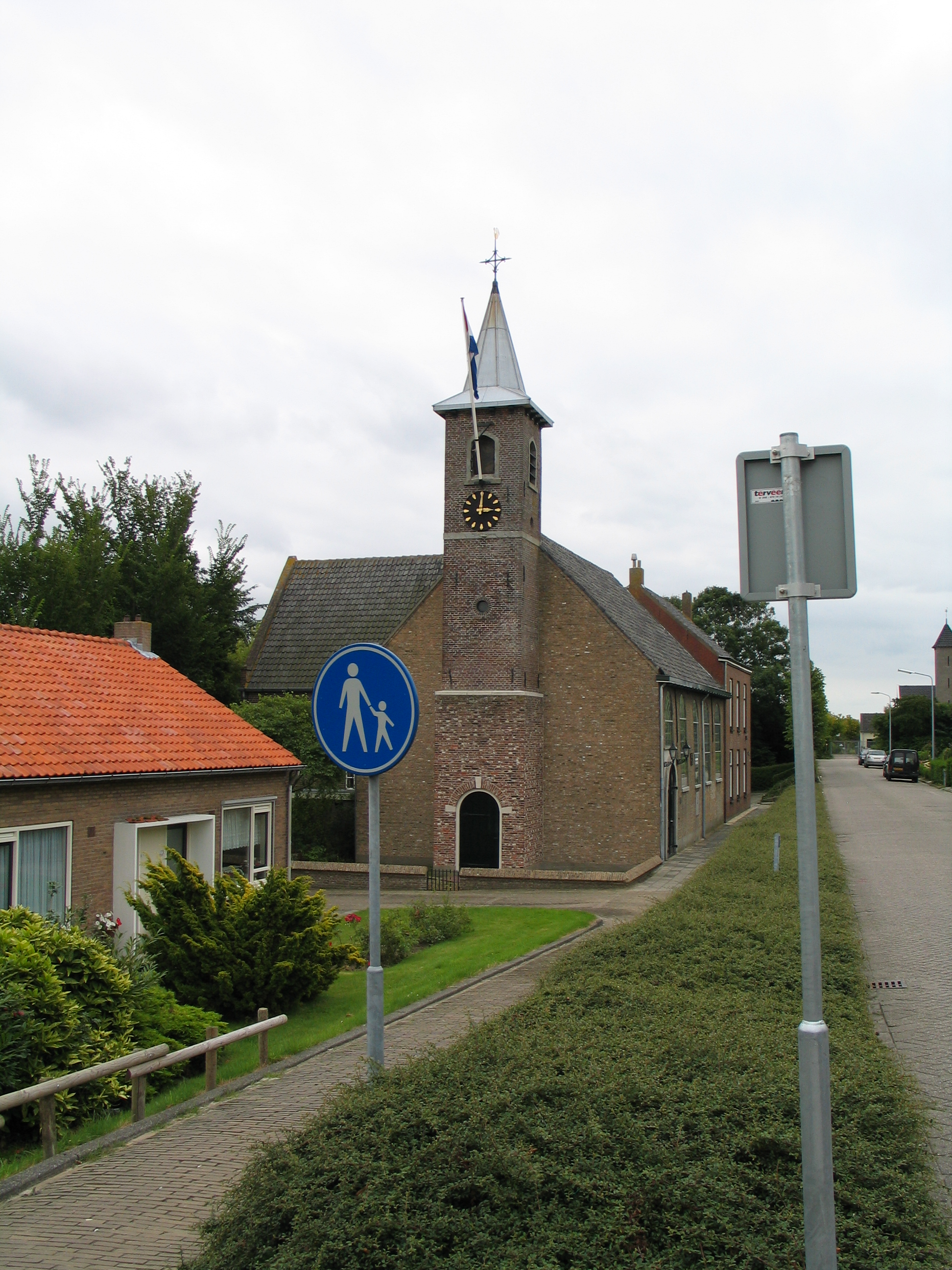
Dutch Reformed church

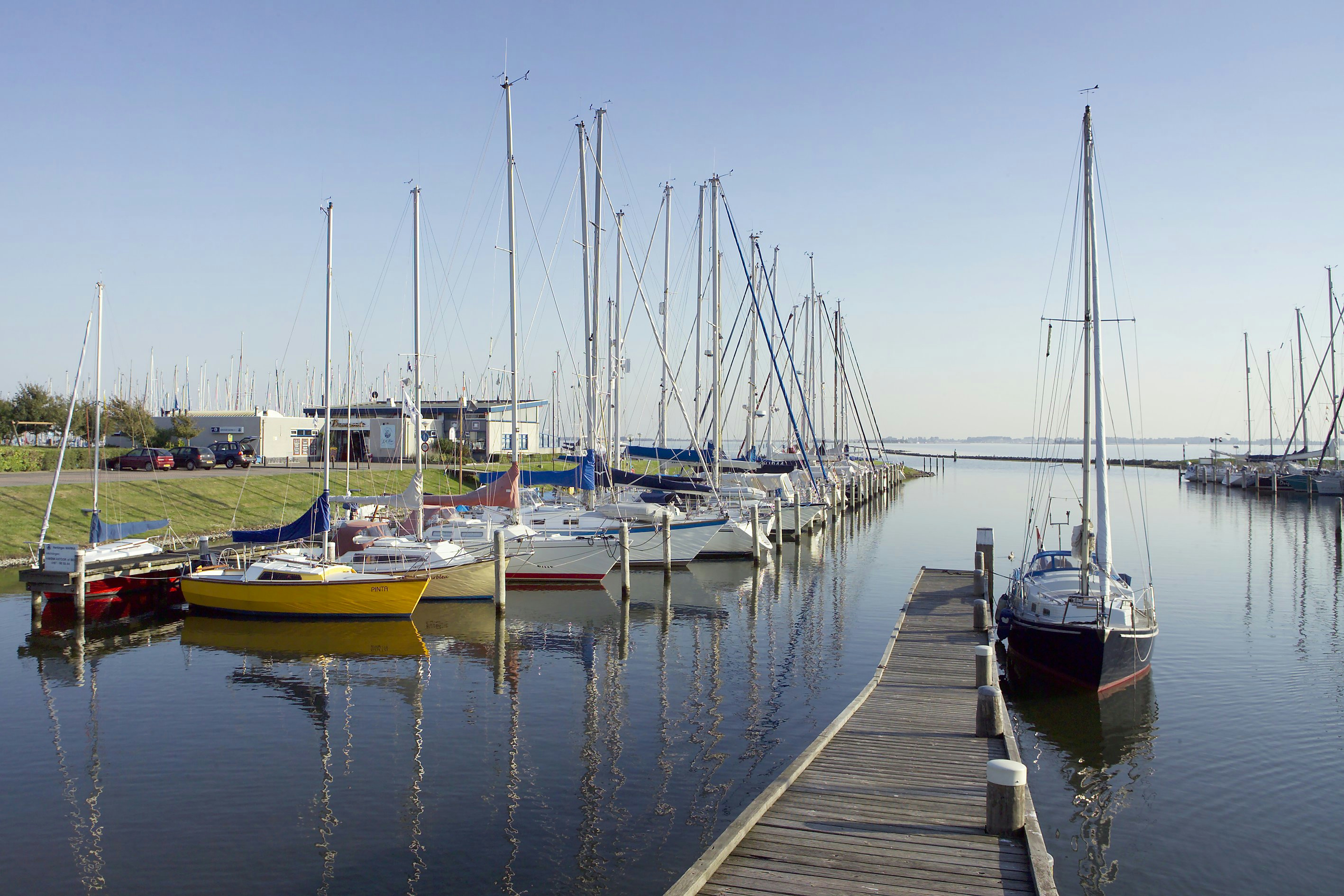
Marina of Herkingen
