= Delta Project =

Delta Project may refer to:

- The Delta Project, a child sexual abuse ring headed by child sex offender John David Norman
- Delta Works, a construction project in the Netherlands
