= Goeree-Overflakkee =

- Island and Municipality
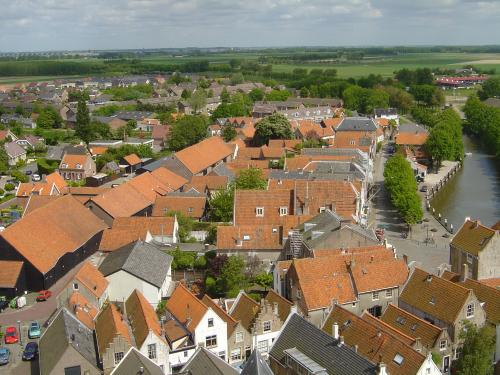
- View over Goedereede

- Flag Coat of arms

- Location in South Holland
- Coordinates: 51°45′N 4°10′E
- Country: Netherlands
- Province: South Holland
- Established: 1 January 2013

Government
  - Body: Municipal council
  - Mayor: Ada Grootenboer-Dubbelman (CDA)

Area
  - Total: 422.35 km^{2} (163.07 sq mi)
  - Land: 260.48 km^{2} (100.57 sq mi)
  - Water: 161.87 km^{2} (62.50 sq mi)
- Elevation: 1 m (3.3 ft)

Population (January 2021)
  - Total: 50,589
  - Density: 194/km^{2} (500/sq mi)
- Time zone: UTC+1 (CET)
  - Summer (DST): UTC+2 (CEST)
- Postcode: 3240–3258
- Area code: 0187
- Website: www.goeree-overflakkee.nl

Map of Goeree-Overflakkee, June 2015

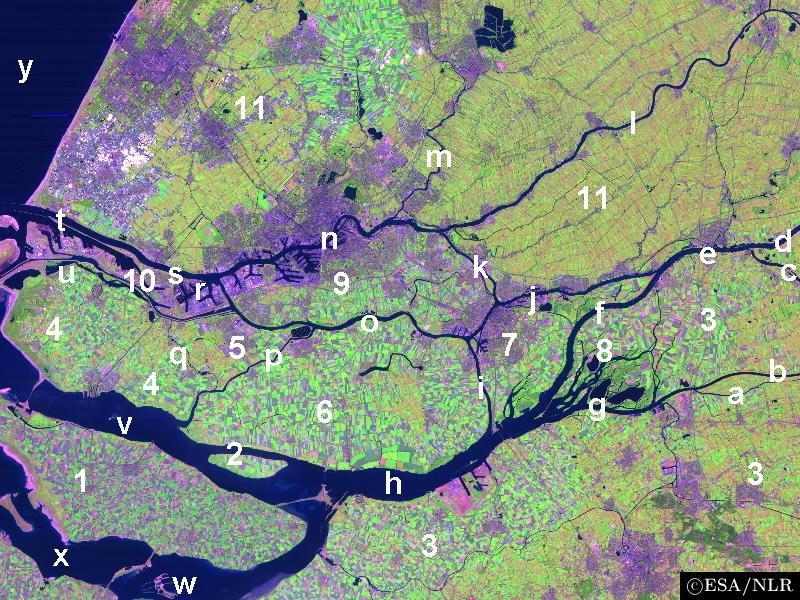
Satellite image of the Scheldt delta. The island of Goeree-Overflakkee (1) is only partly shown.

Goeree-Overflakkee (Dutch pronunciation: [ɣuˌreː ˈoːvərflɑˌkeː]) is a delta island and an administrative municipality in the province of South Holland, Netherlands, with a population of 50,589. It is the largest island by land area in the Netherlands after the man-made Flevopolder.

Goeree-Overflakkee is separated from the islands of Voorne-Putten and Hoeksche Waard by the Haringvliet, from the mainland of North Brabant by the Volkerak, and from Schouwen-Duiveland by Lake Grevelingen.

Despite being part of the province of South Holland, the island's scenery and dialect are more closely related to Zeeland than to Holland. On the island they speak a form of Zeelandic, namely Goereês in the west and Flakkees in the east.

== History ==
The island was detached from the mainland when the Haringvliet formed as a result of two major flooding events. The first was in 1216, which breached the dunes of Voorne and created a deep saltwater inlet. In the St. Elizabeth floods of 1421, this inlet connected to the Merwede and became an important estuary of the Rhine and Meuse rivers.

Since 2013, Goeree-Overflakkee has also been a municipality consisting, from west to east, of the former municipalities of Goedereede, Dirksland, Middelharnis, and Oostflakkee. The largest towns are Sommelsdijk, Middelharnis, Ouddorp, and Dirksland.

== Politics ==
The municipal council of Goeree-Overflakkee has of 31 members which, after the 2026 municipal elections, were divided as follows:

Municipal council seats
Party	2022
Trots Op Goeree-Overflakkee	10
Reformed Political Party (SGP)	6
Christian Democratic Appeal (CDA)	6
GreenLeft/Labour	2
GAAN	2
People's Party for Freedom & Democracy (VVD)	2
ChristianUnion (CU)	2
D66	1
Total	31

== Former municipalities ==
=== Goedereede ===
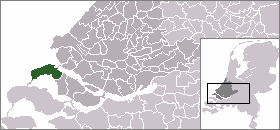
Goedereede

From west to east the former municipality of Goedereede consists of Ouddorp (with Oostdijk), Goedereede (with Havenhoofd), and Stellendam. Income comes mainly of tourism and fishery. With a long beach nearby, Ouddorp is a tourist attraction and has a number of camping sites. Goedereede and Stellendam both have an extended fishing fleet. The town of Goedereede has many old buildings and a tall church tower. Goedereede is one of two towns on the island that obtained city rights. Stellendam was hit hard in the 1953 storm flood and several monuments in the town commemorate this tragedy. Next to Stellendam lies the Haringvlietdam which shelters the Haringvliet from the North Sea, this dam is part of the Delta Project. On the island side of the dam a 'Delta Expo' provides a guide to the dam.

=== Dirksland ===
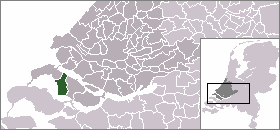
Dirksland

The former municipality of Dirksland consisted of Melissant, Herkingen, and Dirksland. The 1953 flood did not have such an effect on these places, as they are mainly lie on higher ground than the rest of the island. Dirksland was the biggest of the three and also has the only hospital on the island. The Van Weel-Bethesda hospital is one of the smallest in the country, but has an excellent reputation, confirmed by national hospital grade polls. Dirksland is recognizable from a distance by the biggest water tower of the country. The towns are agriculturally focused and also have several camp sites. Dirksland has an inland harbor with a newly restored gate complex. Herkingen lies on the south side of the island and borders the Grevelingenmeer, a saltwater lake that has been disconnected directly from the North Sea by the Brouwersdam, but still connects to the Oosterschelde which is saltwater. The Grevelingenmeer is a large watersports area with the main recreational areas on Schouwen-Duiveland. Herkingen is trying to join in with the tourism industry and has quite a large yachting harbor. The town of Herkingen currently hosts several of the biggest modern windmills in the country.

=== Middelharnis ===
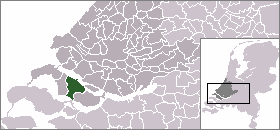
Middelharnis

The former municipality of Middelharnis, forming the center of the island, was the biggest of the four with over 17,000 inhabitants. It consisted of Sommelsdijk, Middelharnis, Nieuwe-Tonge, and Stad aan 't Haringvliet. Middelharnis has a shopping area called D'n Diek. This shopping center settled itself on a dike which used to be the last barrier for the towns from the Haringvliet. Now extensive, this dike and the area is enjoying a huge face lift. On Fridays in the summer months, there are what are called the Diekdagen (Dike days in English), with special activities like sports car racing and bicycle racing in the middle of the town. The town hosts a public high school and a Christian high school. Middelharnis has an inland harbor with a connection to the Haringvliet. In Middelharnis the old municipality building lies on the main street. In Sommelsdijk there is a sport complex with swimming pool, called De Staver. Stad aan 't Haringvliet has a small harbor with a beach. Like most of the towns on the island the old windmill has been preserved. Nieuwe-Tonge's main entry roads are the two dikes that form the edges of the town.

=== Oostflakkee ===
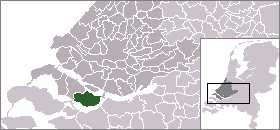
Oostflakkee

The former municipality of Oostflakkee consists of: Den Bommel (with Zuidzijde), Oude-Tonge, Ooltgensplaat, Achthuizen, and Langstraat. Oude-Tonge was the main town of the former municipality with a considerable industrial area. It also has a large bus station. Oude-Tonge suffered most in 1953 flood and was visited by the queen in 2003 to commemorate the 50th anniversary of this event. Den Bommel has a harbor and beach on the shores of the Haringvliet. A few kilometres (miles) east of Den Bommel is Zuidzijde, a very small town. Ooltgensplaat is the most eastward town on the island with a harbor on the Volkerak. The town has a very old municipal building. This town hosts the start and finish of De Omloop – an annual 100+ km (60 mile) walk around the island within a 24-hour period. It is held in the latter half of August and attracts thousands, both participants and spectators. Achthuizen and Langstraat are other small towns nearby Ooltgensplaat.

== Notable people ==
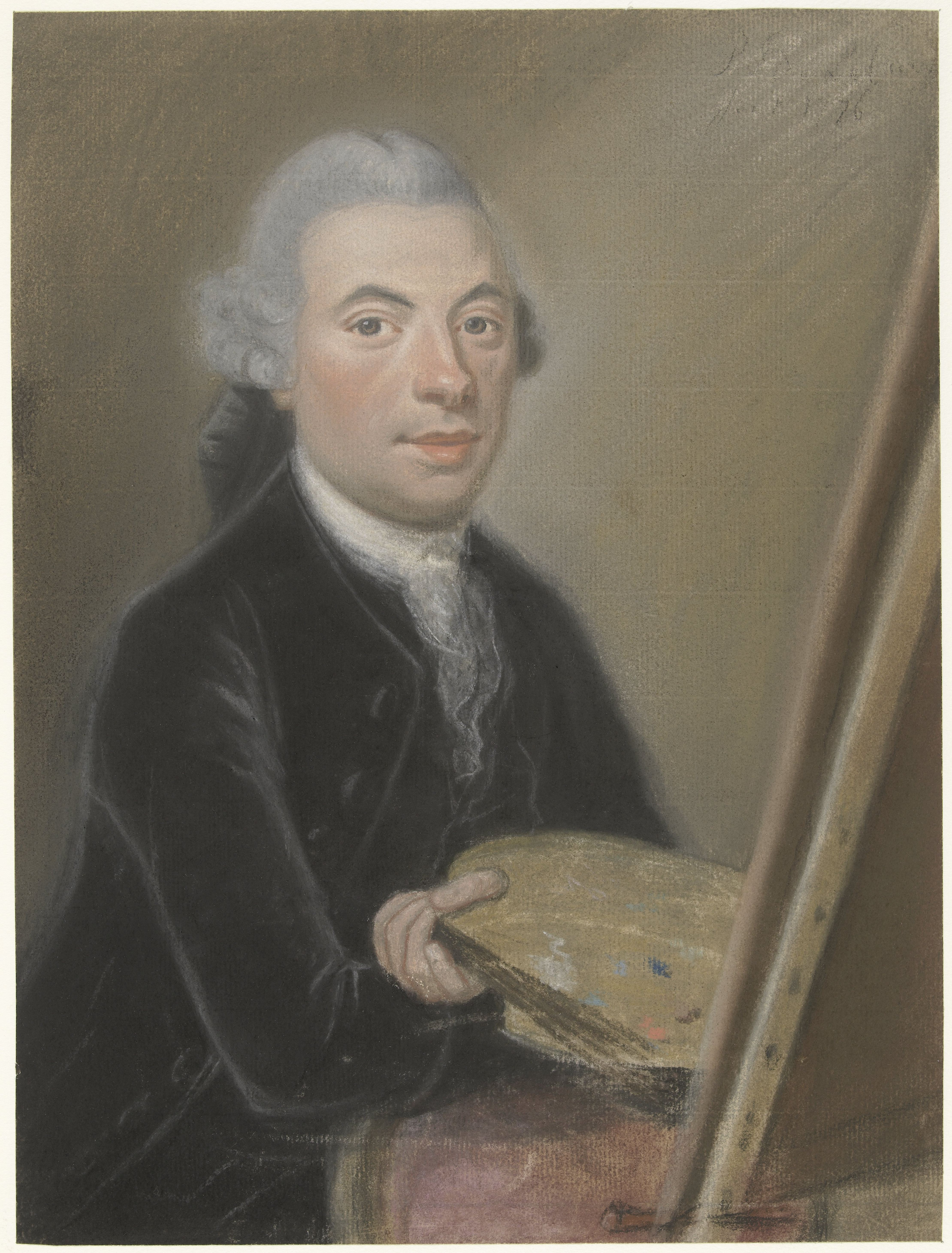
Jan van Os, 1776

- Jan van Os (1744 in Middelharnis – 1808) a painter
- Laurens J. Bol (1898 in Ooltgensplaat – 1994) an art historian, specialized in Dutch Golden Age painters
- Aart Alblas (1918 in Middelharnis – 1944 in Mauthausen concentration camp) highly decorated Dutch resistance member
- Tomas Ross (born 1944 in Den Bommel) a writer of historical criminal thrillers
- Elco Brinkman (born 1948 in Dirksland) a retired politician and businessman.
- Toine van Peperstraten (born 1967 in Achthuizen) a sports journalist
- Barbara Baarsma (born 1969) an economist, grew up in Goeree-Overflakkee
- Liesbeth Zegveld (born 1970 in Ridderkerk) a lawyer, legal expert and professor

=== Sport ===
- Jan Pieterse (born 1942 in Oude-Tonge) a former professional racing cyclist, gold medallist in the Men's 100 km Team Trial at the 1964 Summer Olympics
- Arie Luyendyk (born 1953 in Sommelsdijk) a former auto racing driver, winner of the 1990 and 1997 Indianapolis 500 races
- Juliette Bergmann (born 1958 in Vlaardingen) a female bodybuilding champion
- Annemarieke van Rumpt (born 1980 in Middelharnis) a rower, bronze medallist with the Dutch eights in the 2004 Summer Olympics

== Gorée in Senegal ==
The island of Gorée in Senegal, notorious in the 18th century as a center for the slave trade, got its name from the Dutch Goeree at the time when it was ruled by the Netherlands (from 1588 to 1664).

== Gallery ==
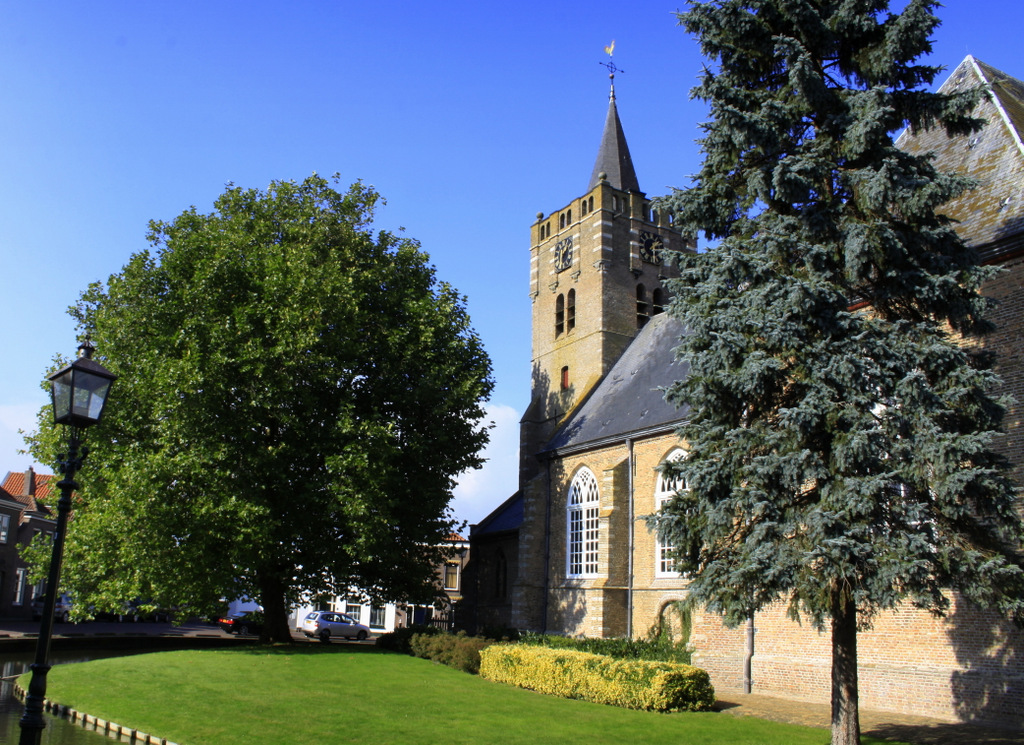
Reformed Church at Nieuwe-Tonge

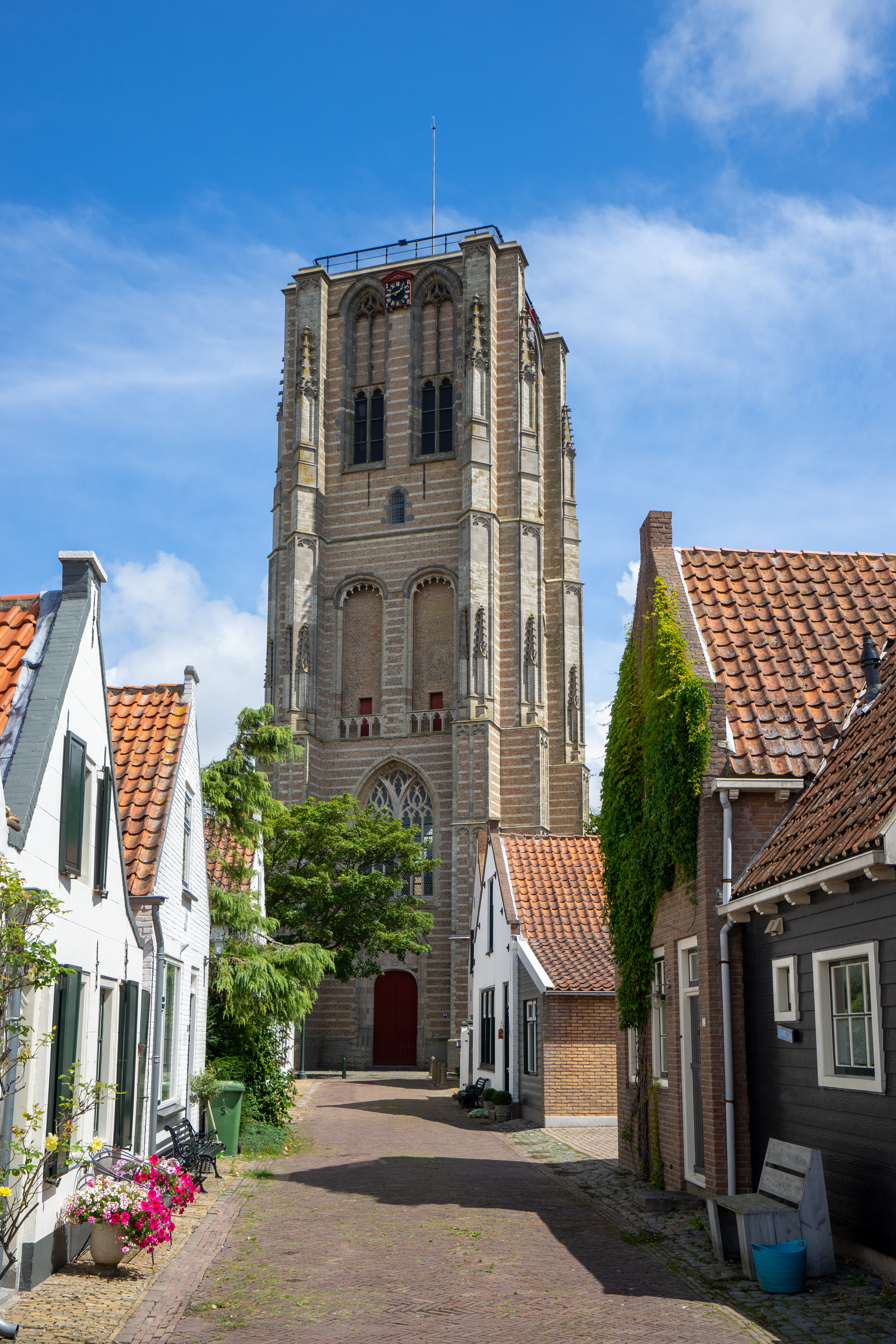
Lighthouse at Goedereede

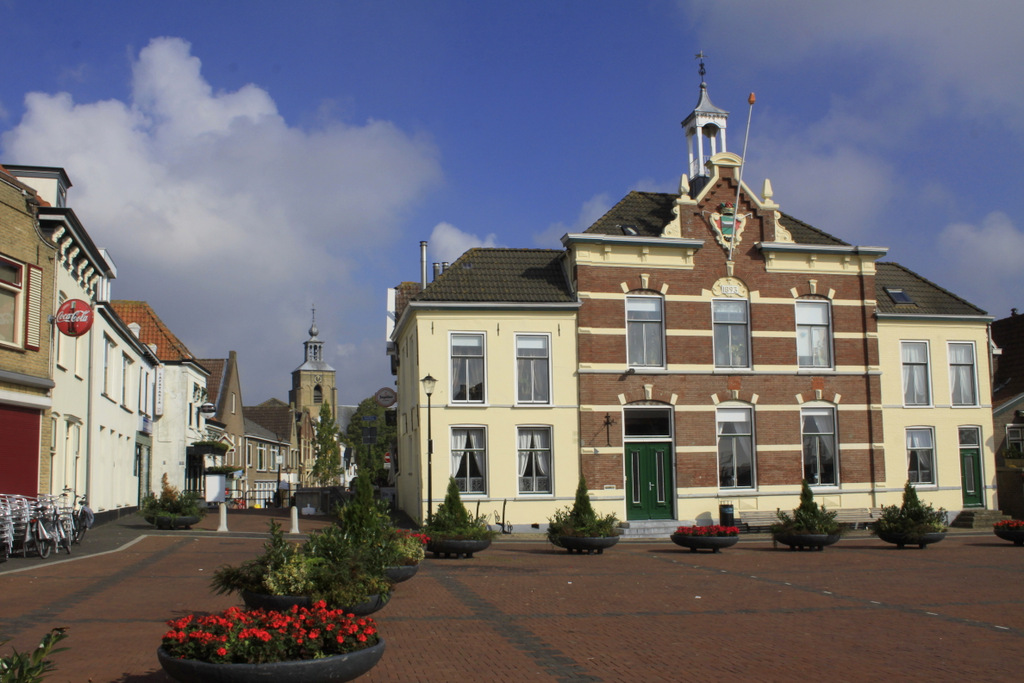
Quay in Oude-Tonge

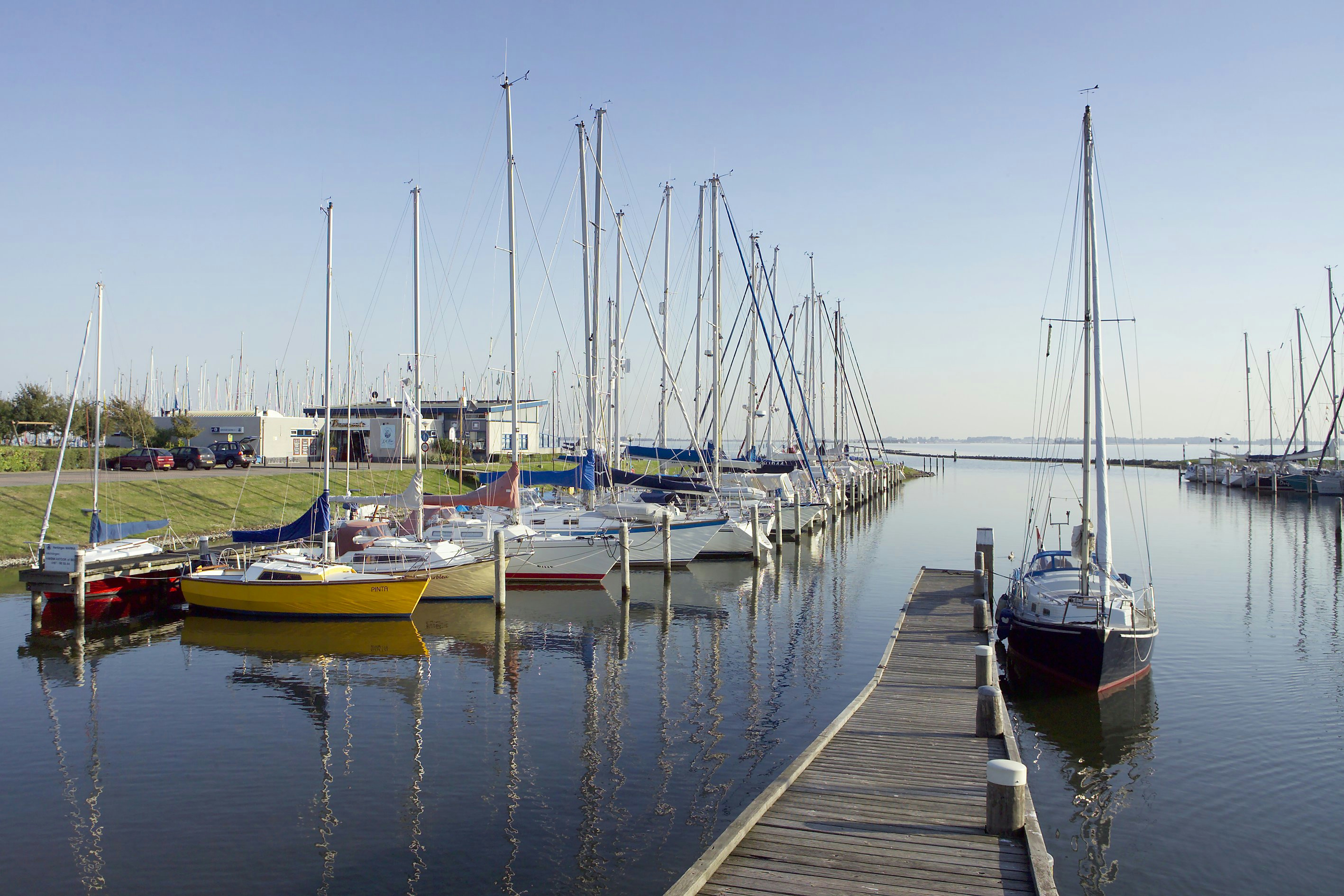
Port at Herkingen
