= Den Bommel =

- Village
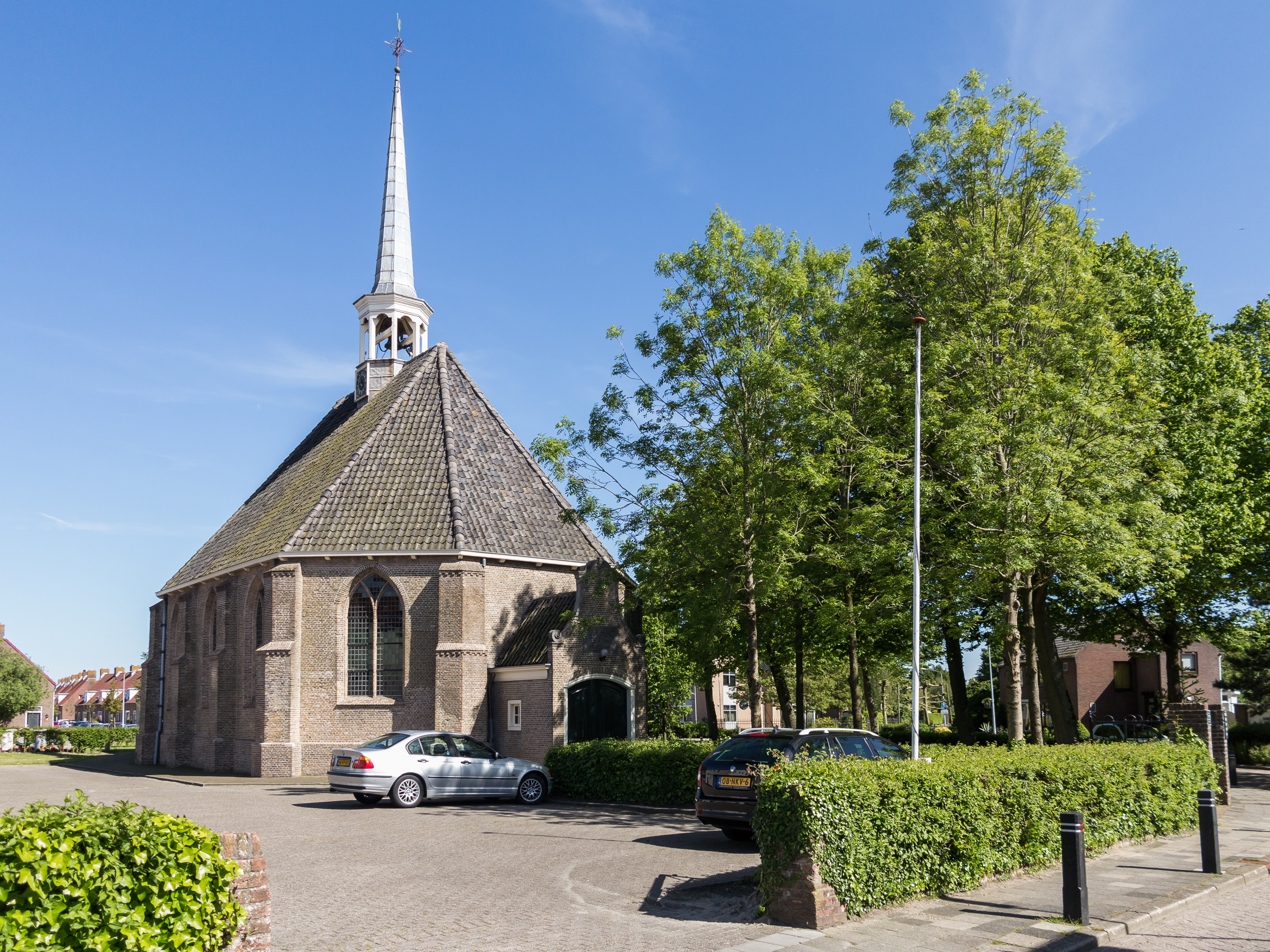
- Dutch Reformed church

- Flag Coat of arms

- Location in the province of South Holland in the Netherlands Location in the Netherlands
- Coordinates: 51.7152420°N 4.2787465°E
- Country: Netherlands
- Province: South Holland
- Municipality: Goeree-Overflakkee

Area
  - Total: 16.35 km^{2} (6.31 sq mi)
- Elevation: 0.8 m (2.6 ft)

Population (2021)
  - Total: 1,705
  - Density: 104.3/km^{2} (270.1/sq mi)
- Time zone: UTC+1 (CET)
  - Summer (DST): UTC+2 (CEST)
- Postal code: 3258
- Dialing code: 0187

Den Bommel is a village in the Dutch province of South Holland. It is a part of the municipality of Goeree-Overflakkee, and lies about 14 km south of Spijkenisse.

== History ==
The village was first mentioned in 1473 as Bommele, and refers to a form of peat. It was originally the name of a shoal which was diked between 1476 and 1477 by order of Mary of Burgundy. Den Bommel became an independent parish in 1642.

The Dutch Reformed church is an aisleless church built between 1646 and 1647. The ridge turret was added in 1759. The grist mill De Bommelaer was built in 1735. The windmill had become derelict and started to deteriorate by 1951. Between 1969 and 1971, it was restored and returned to active service.

Den Bommel was home to 620 people in 1840. In 1944, the sluice from 1722 was blown up by the Germans causing the destruction of the town hall. Den Bommel was flooded during the North Sea flood of 1953 and was later extended further east. It was an independent municipality until 1966 when it was merged into Oostflakkee. In 2013, it became part of the municipality of Goeree-Overflakkee.

In 1964, a grog statue was revealed for Sir Olivier B. Bommel. It had started to deteriorate and in 1995, the Society of Gentlemen of Good Standing was founded to construct a bronze statue of their role model. The new statue was revealed in 1997.

== Gallery ==
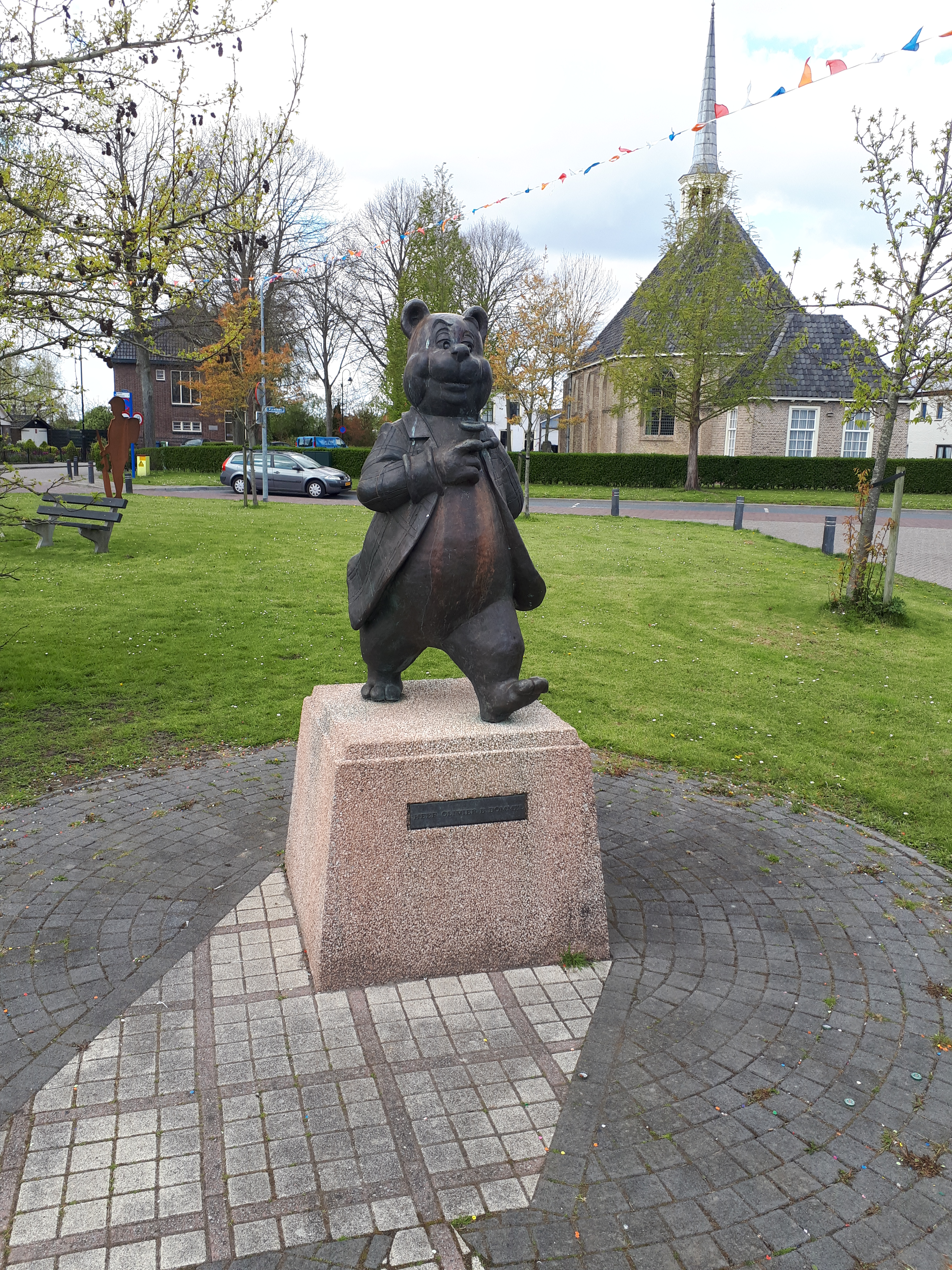
Sir Olivier B. Bommel statue

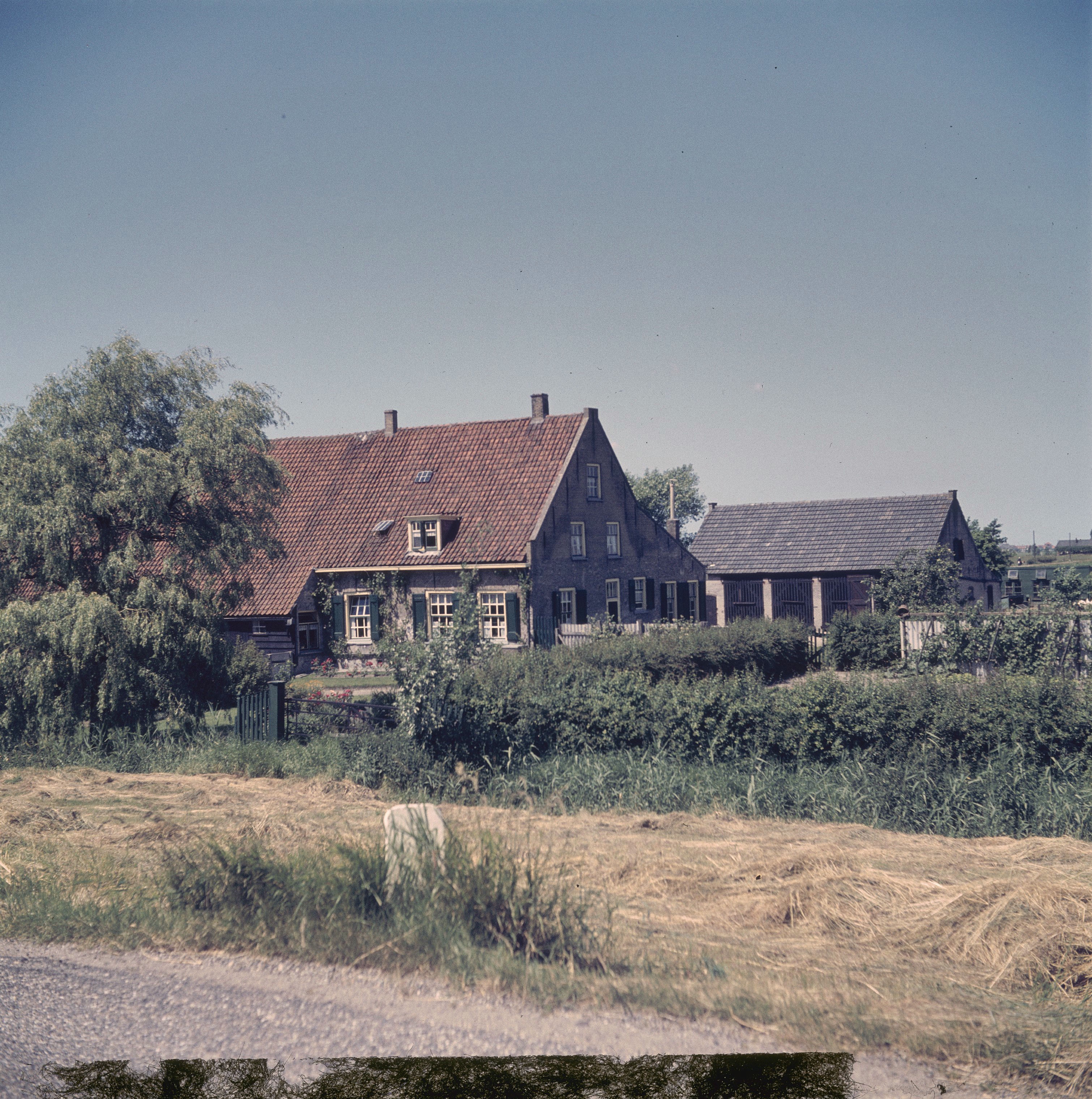
Farm in Den Bommel

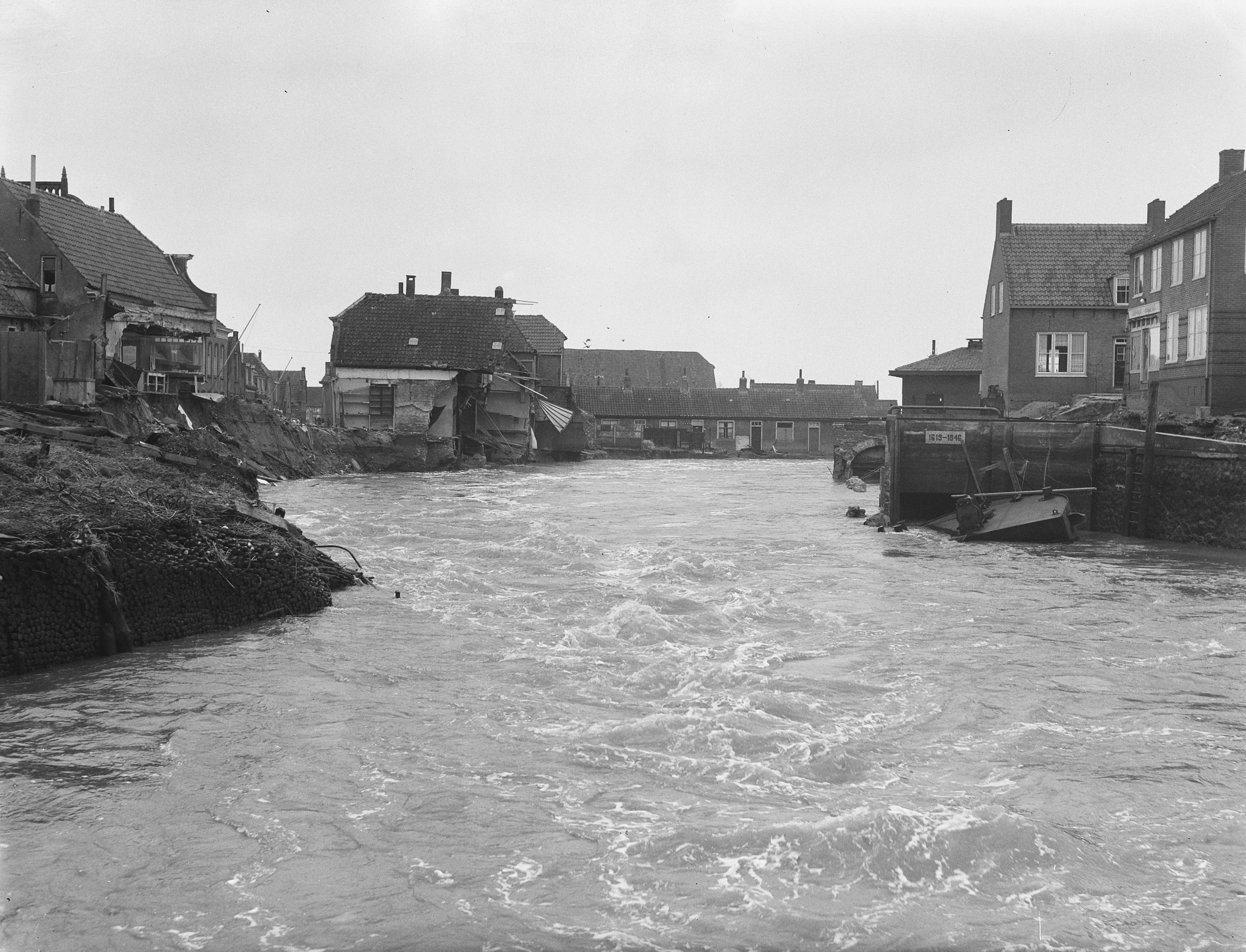
North Sea flood of 1953

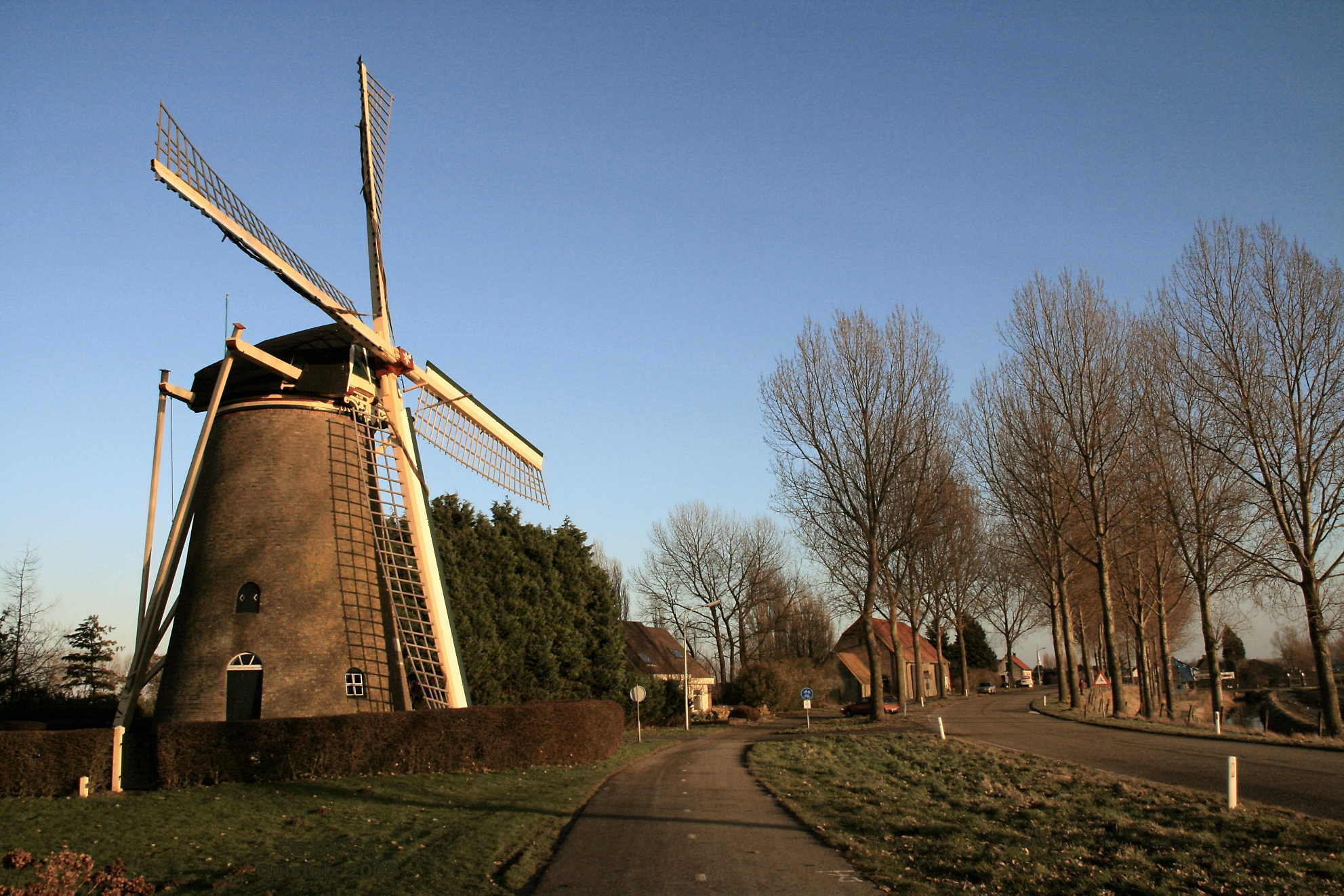
Windmill De Bommelaer
