= Nieuwe-Tonge =

- Village
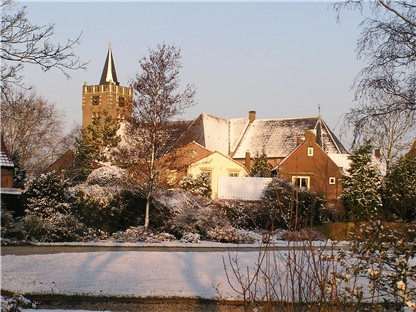
- Protestant church in Nieuwe Tonge

- Location in the province of South Holland in the Netherlands Location in the Netherlands
- Coordinates: 51.7137673°N 4.1648166°E
- Country: Netherlands
- Province: South Holland
- Municipality: Goeree-Overflakkee

Area
  - Total: 14.23 km^{2} (5.49 sq mi)
- Elevation: 0.6 m (2.0 ft)

Population (2021)
  - Total: 2,415
  - Density: 169.7/km^{2} (439.6/sq mi)
- Time zone: UTC+1 (CET)
  - Summer (DST): UTC+2 (CEST)
- Postal code: 3244
- Dialing code: 0187

Nieuwe-Tonge is a village in the Dutch province of South Holland. It is a part of the municipality of Goeree-Overflakkee, and lies about 13 km south of Hellevoetsluis.

== History ==
The village was first mentioned in 1480 or 1481 as "Nova ecclesia in Grijsoert". The current name means "new headland". Nieuwe (new) has been added to distinguish from Oude-Tonge. Nieuwe-Tonge developed shortly after a dike was built around the Het Noordland polder in 1461. It used to have a harbour, but it was relocated to Battenoord in 1504.

The Dutch Reformed is a single aisled cruciform church built around 1500. The choir was damaged by fire in 1723. The church was restored between 1965 and 1969 and a baluster was added to the tower. The grist mill d'Oranjeboom was in 1768. It was in service until 1960. Between 1969 and 1971, it was restored and returned to active service.

Nieuwe-Tonge was home to 1,121 people in 1840. The village was severely affected by the North Sea flood of 1953. Nieuwe-Tonge was a separate municipality until 1966, when it became part of Middelharnis. In 2013, it became part of the municipality of Goeree-Overflakkee.

The Fauna Park Flakkee is a small zoo. It was founded in 1995, and is a non-commercial zoo run by volunteers. Originally, it specialised in birds. Since 2018, it is officially a zoo.

== Gallery ==
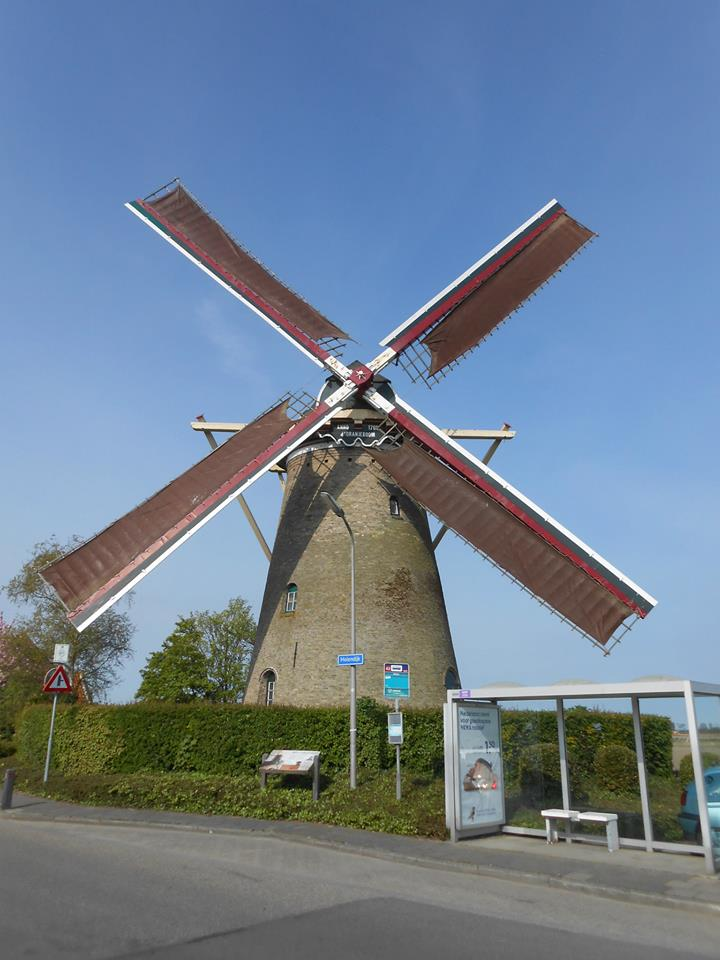
Windmill D'Oranjeboom

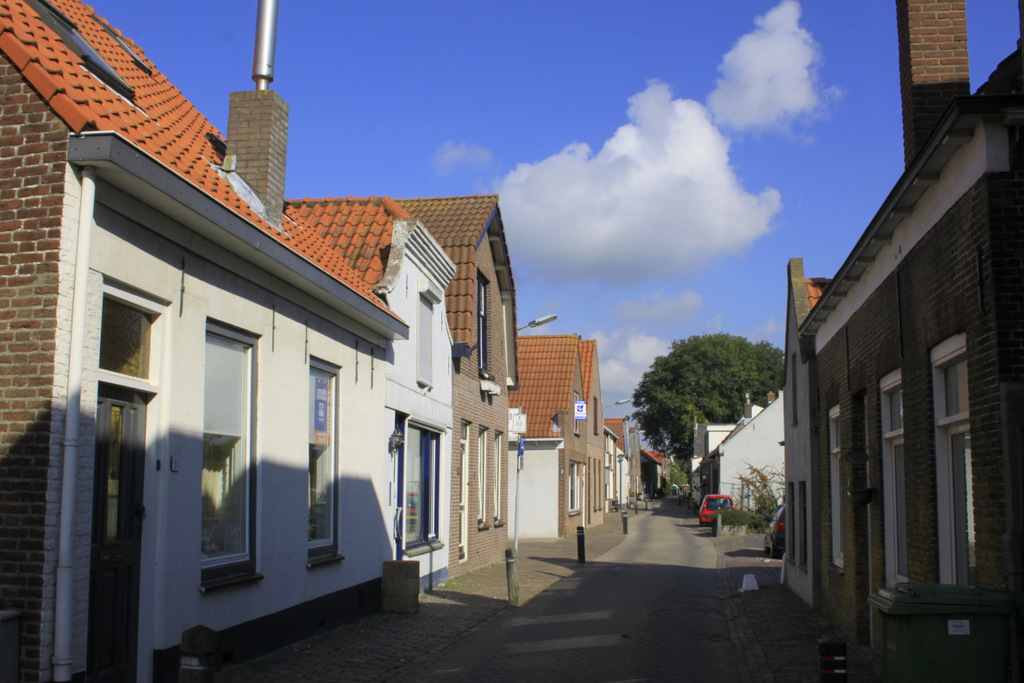
Street view
