= Middelharnis =

- Town and former municipality
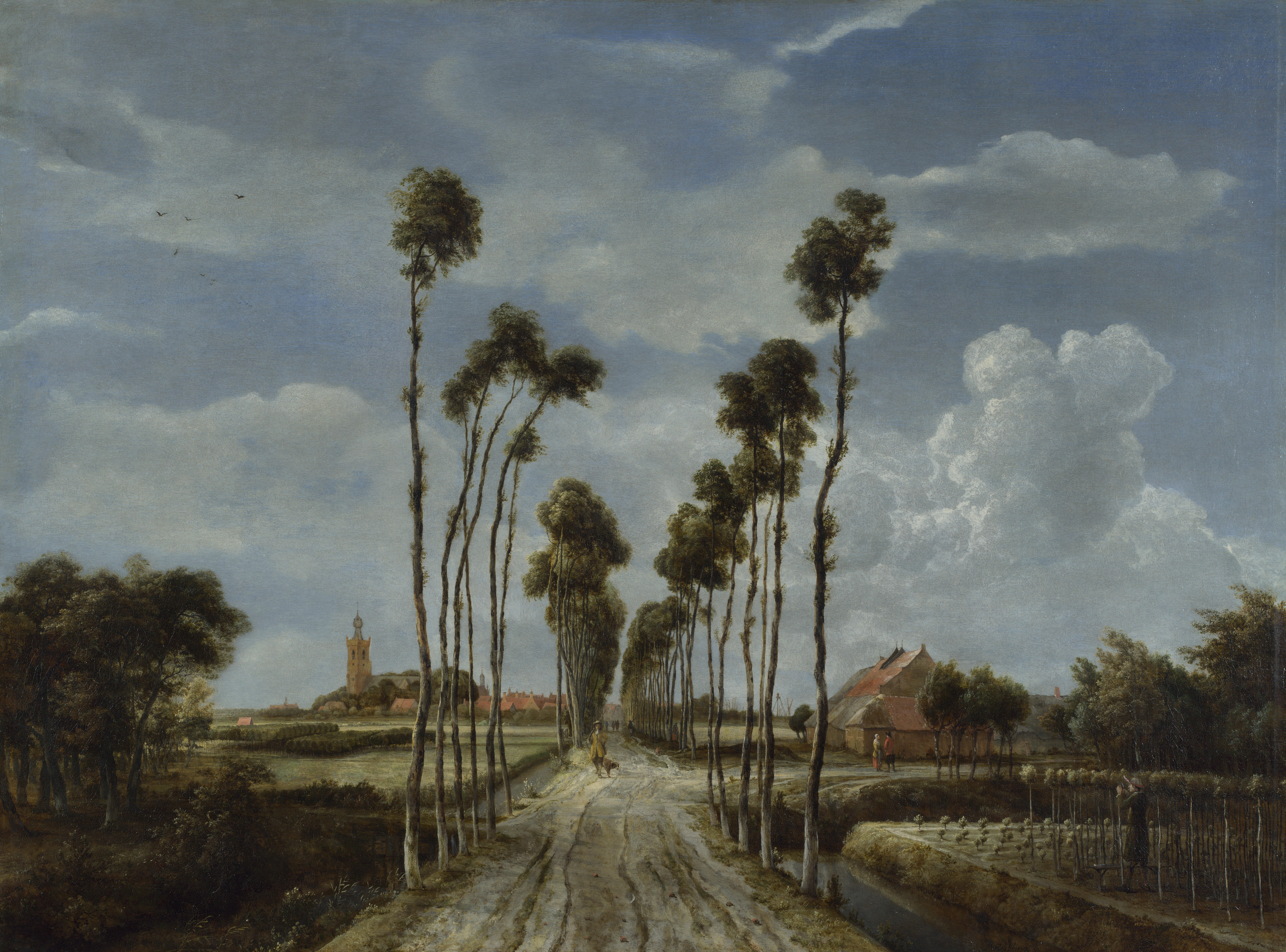
- The Avenue at Middelharnis by Meindert Hobbema, 1689

- Coat of arms

- Location in the province of South Holland in the Netherlands Location in the Netherlands
- Coordinates: 51.75°N 4.17°E
- Country: Netherlands
- Province: South Holland
- Municipality: Goeree-Overflakkee

Area
  - Total: 17.98 km^{2} (6.94 sq mi)
- Elevation: 0.3 m (0.98 ft)

Population (2021)
  - Total: 7,645
  - Density: 425.2/km^{2} (1,101/sq mi)
- Time zone: UTC+1 (CET)
  - Summer (DST): UTC+2 (CEST)
- Postal code: 3241
- Dialing code: 0187

Middelharnis (Dutch pronunciation: [ˌmɪdəlˈɦɑrnɪs]) is a town and former municipality in the western Netherlands, in the province of South Holland, on the island of Goeree-Overflakkee. The town had a population of about 6,800 in 2012. On 1 January 2013, Middelharnis merged with Goedereede, Dirksland, and Oostflakkee into the new municipality of Goeree-Overflakkee.

== History ==
The village was first mentioned in 1466 as "die Middelharnisse". The etymology is disputed. Middelharnis developed after a dike was built around the Oudeland polder in 1465. In 1598, a fish auction was built in Middelharnis and it developed into a regional centre.

The Dutch Reformed church is a double aisled cruciform church from the 15th century. The tower was built in stages from c. 1475 until c. 1520. The church was devastated by fire in 1904 and later restored.

The former town hall is a prominently situated neoclassic building with ridge turret built between 1639 and 1640. It was designed by Arent van 's-Gravesande. It was extended between 1834 and 1839. The town hall is in use as the Rien Poortvliet museum since 1992.

Middelharnis was home to 3,104 people in 1840 and was home to 7,755 people in 2022. It merged with Sommelsdijk into a single urban area. It was an independent municipality until 2013 when it merged into Goeree-Overflakkee. The town hall of the new municipality is located in Middelharnis.

Middelharnis has a shopping area called D'n Diek. This shopping center settled itself on a dike which used to be the last barrier for the town from the Haringvliet. The town hosts two public and one Christian high school. Middelharnis has an inland harbor with connection to the Haringvliet. There is also a small beach which can get very crowded in the summertime. In Middelharnis the old main street has the old municipality building.

== Gallery ==
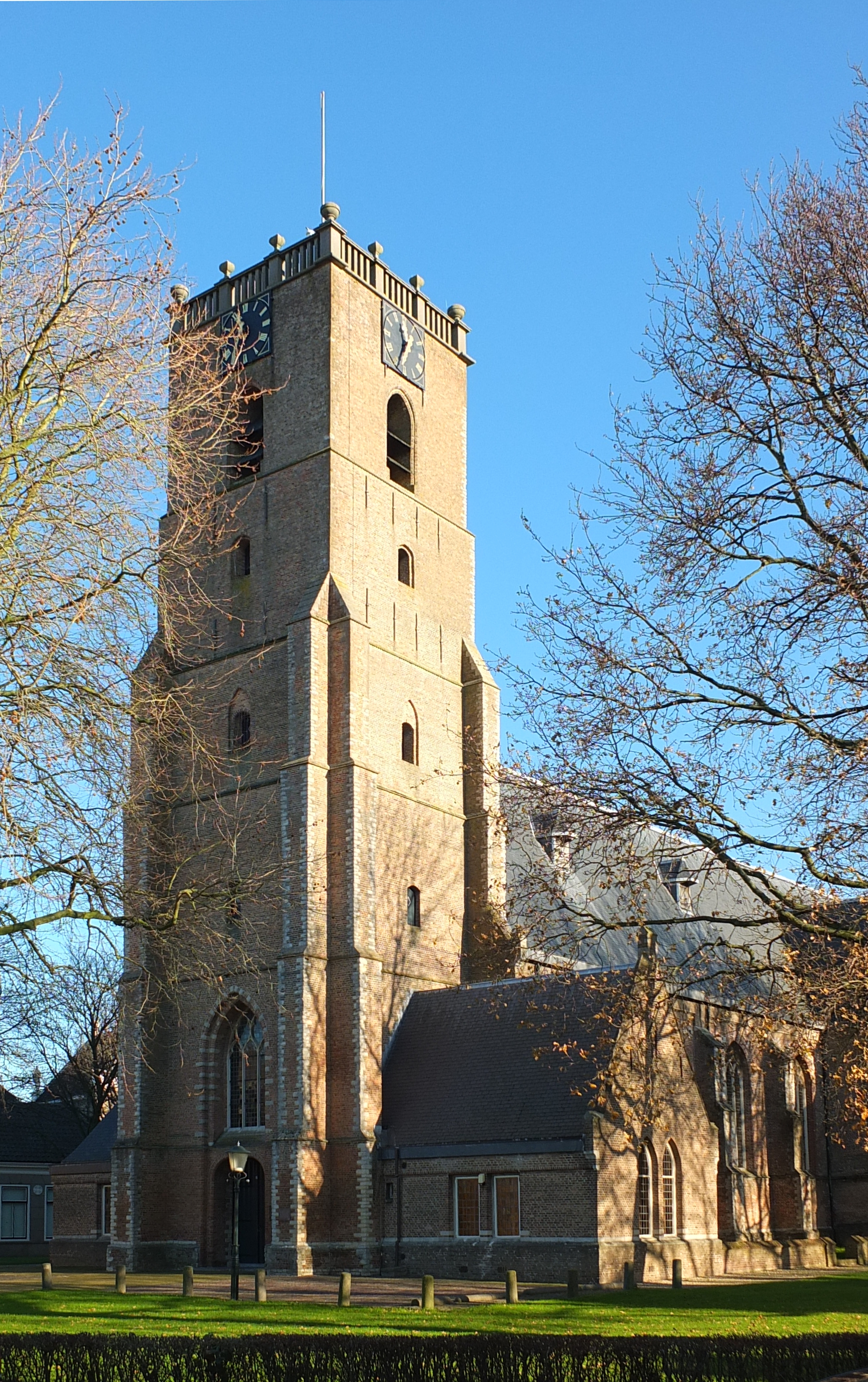
Dutch Reformed Church.

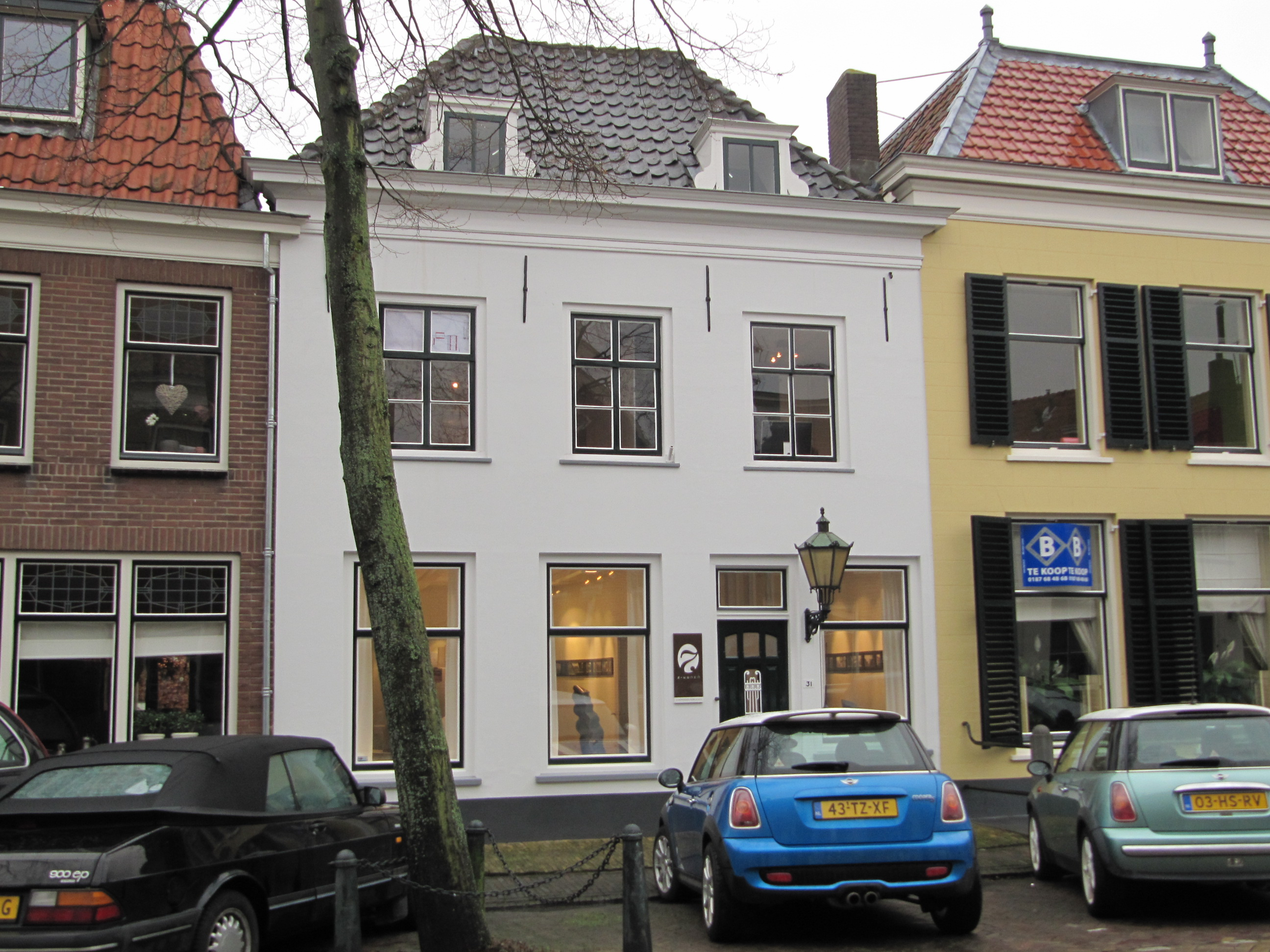
House in Middelharnis

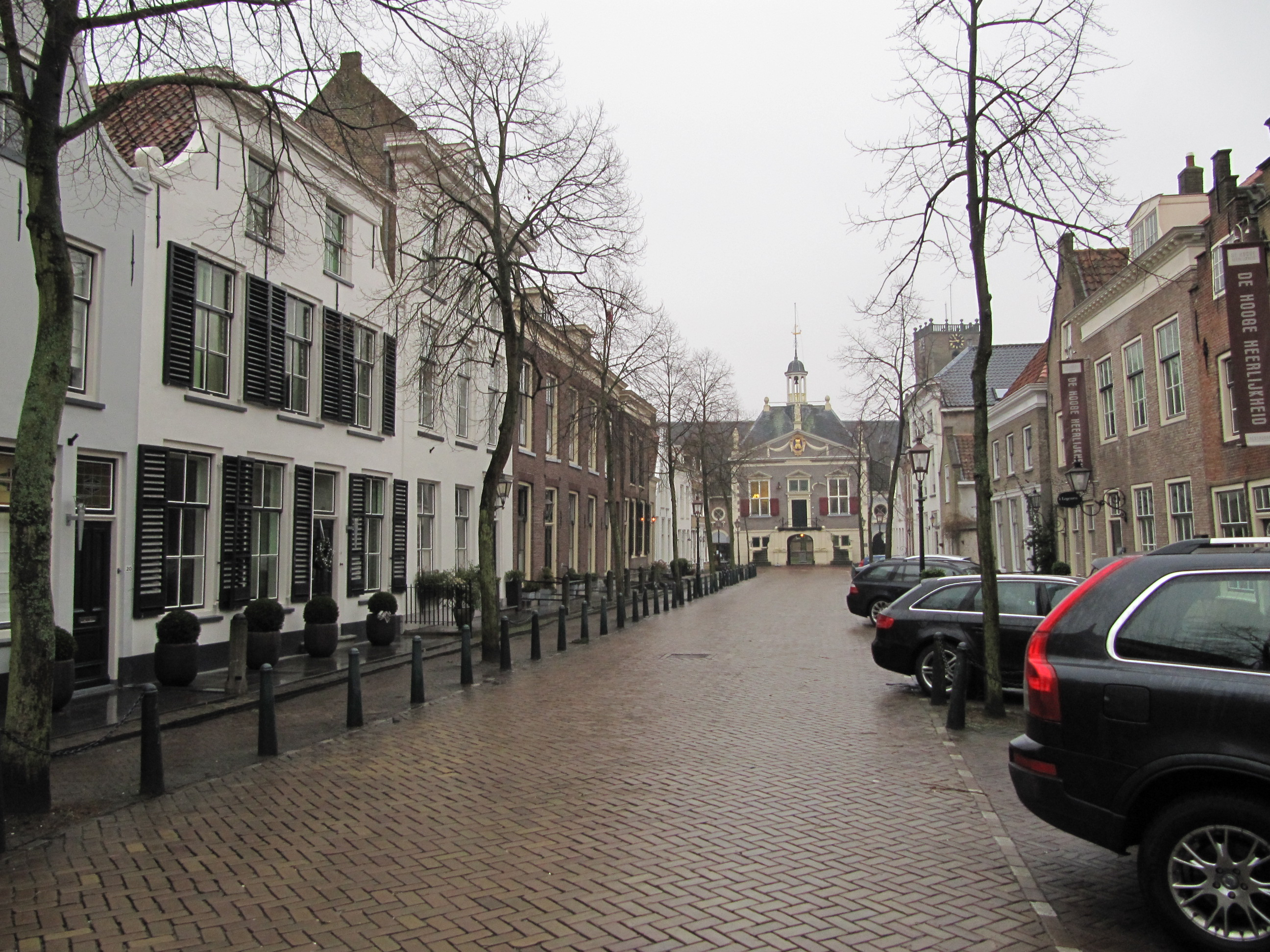
Street view

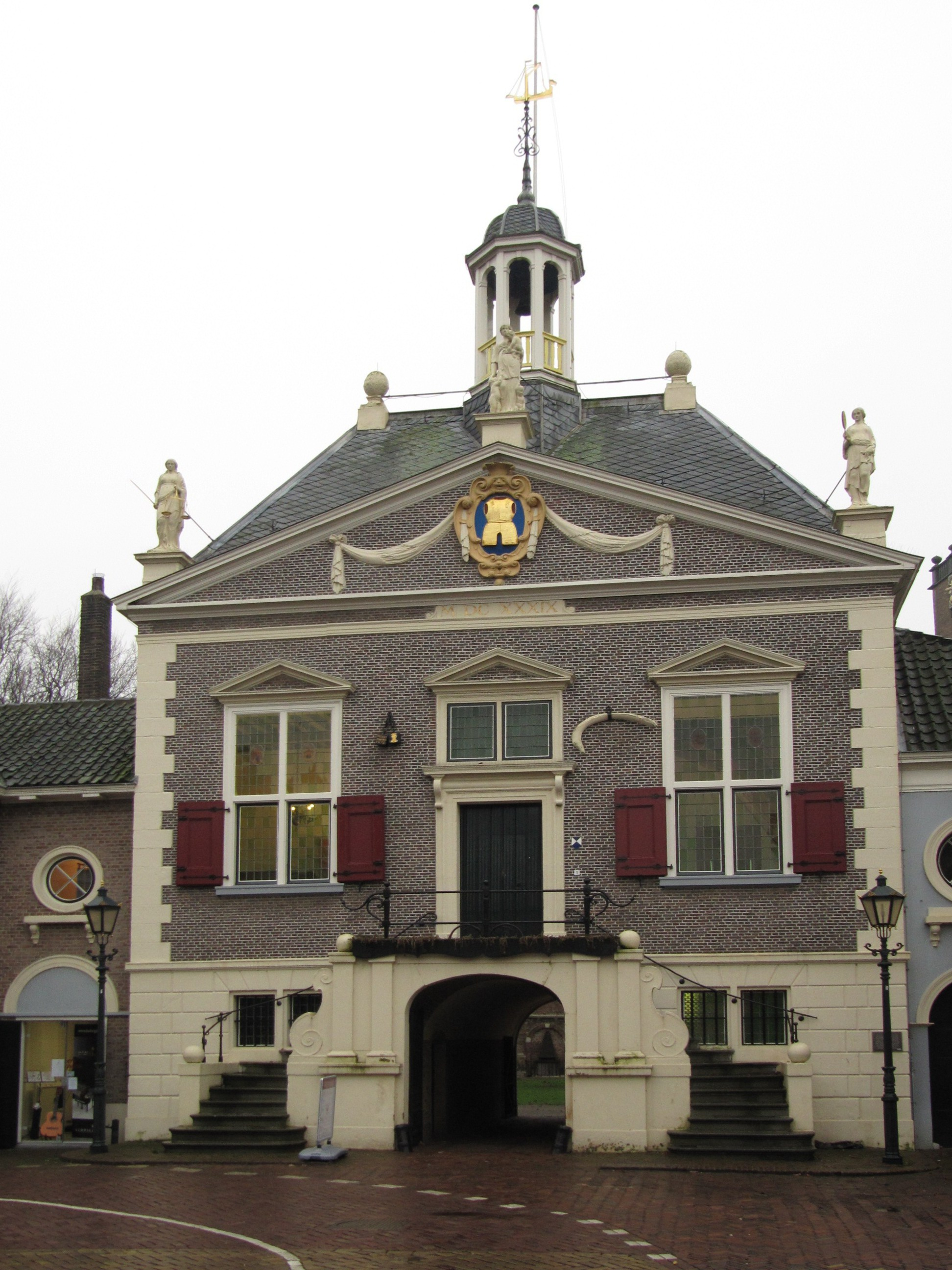
Former town hall
