= De Noord (Rotterdam) =

Former Dutch windmill

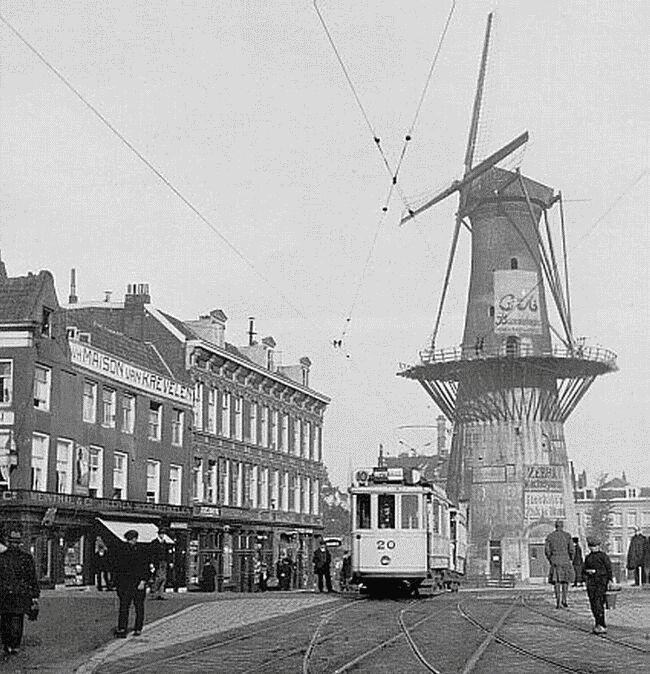
- De Noord in 1920

Origin
- Coordinates: 51°55′23″N 4°29′49″E
- Year built: 1711

Information
- Purpose: Malt mill, later grain mill
- Type: Tower mill
- Year lost: 1954

De Noord (English: The North) was a tower mill located on the Oostplein in Rotterdam, Netherlands. It was built between 1695 and 1711 as a replacement for a post mill which had stood at the site since around 1562. De Noord was used as a malt mill until the nineteenth century, when it switched to grinding grain for animal feed.

The mill was almost demolished in 1919, but intervention by the city council saved it. The mill was one of the only buildings to survive the German bombing of Rotterdam in World War II and during the Nazi occupation of the Netherlands, it became a symbol of Dutch resistance.

De Noord was destroyed in a fire during the night of 27–28 July 1954; despite being well-insured, the remains were demolished soon after due to the extent of the damage and because the mill would get in the way of traffic. There was a campaign for the mill to be rebuilt soon after which raised 20,000 guilders, but the plan was rejected by the city council by 22 votes to 18.

Frans Blok, a Rotterdam designer, launched a new campaign to rebuild De Noord as part of a redesign of the Oostplein in 2020. According to Blok, it would improve the Oostplein by giving it more green space and would be comparable to mills that had been rebuilt elsewhere in the Netherlands, such as the Molen De Kameel in Schiedam. In Blok's plans, the mill would not be built on its original site, as the Oostplein metro station now lies under it.

== See also ==
- List of destroyed heritage#Netherlands
- List of windmills in South Holland
- De Noord, a similarly named mill in Scheidam
