= De Nolet =

Windmill in the Netherlands

Coordinates: 51°54′27″N 4°24′30″E

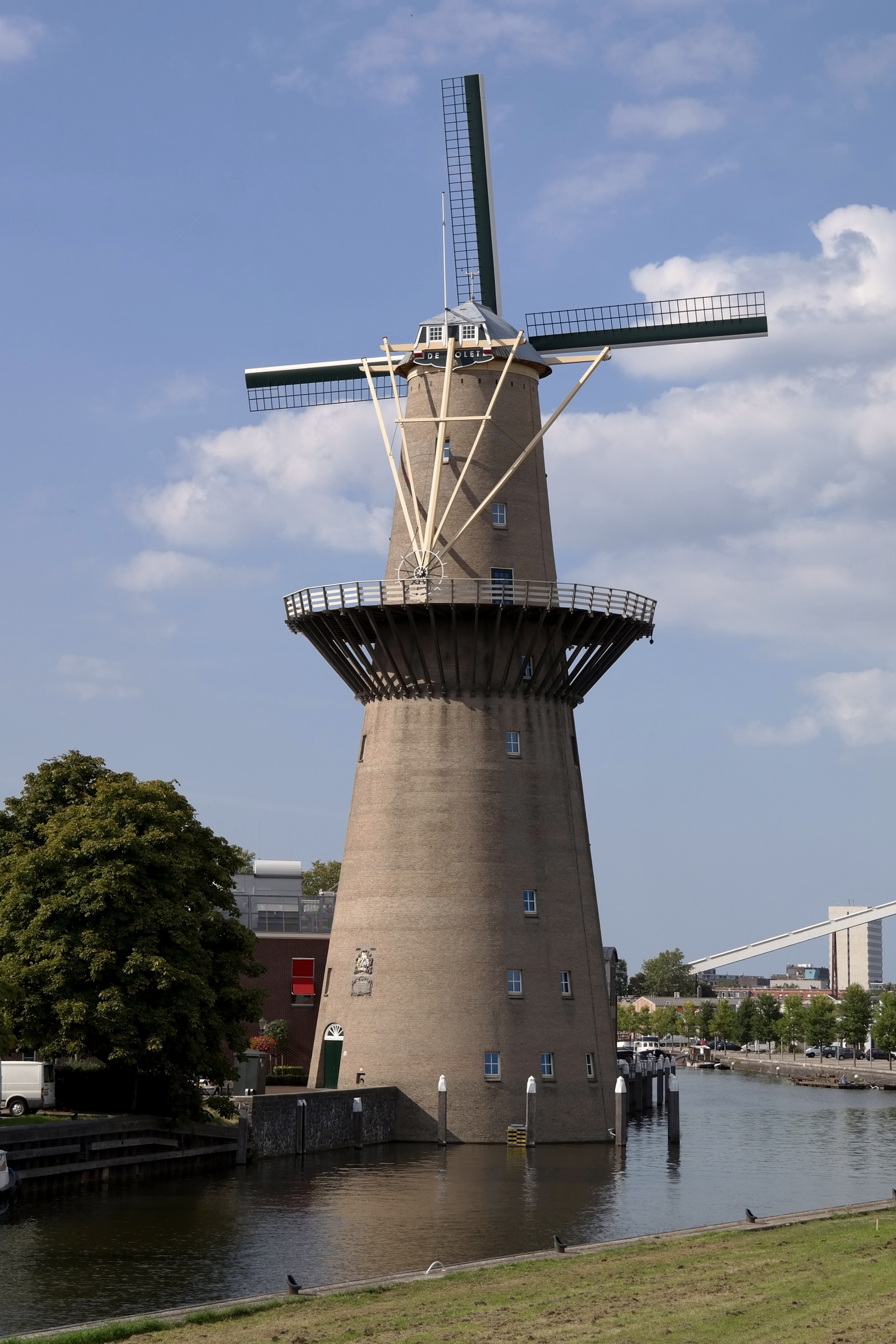
De Nolet

Dutch: De Nolet (also known as Noletmolen) is a wind turbine in Schiedam, Netherlands that is disguised as a traditional Schiedam windmill. De Nolet has a tower height of 43 metres (141 ft) and a gross height of 55 metres (180 ft) including its rotor tips. The turbine's rated capacity is 150 kW.

It is 9 metres (30 ft) higher than De Noord which is the tallest windmill in the world.

De Nolet was built in 2005 by the Nolet Distillery to power their distilling factory which produces the Ketel One vodkas and gins.

== See also ==
- List of windmills in Schiedam
- Fuhrländer Wind Turbine Laasow, tallest wind turbine in the world
