= List of windmills in Schiedam =

The Windmills of Schiedam are the tallest windmills in the world. Of nearly 50 sites in and around the city, eight mills stand today. This list includes mills in former municipalities now incorporated into Schiedam.

== Windmills ==
Name, Coordinates	Type	Year built	Remarks	Photograph
Babbersmolen; 51°55′2.05″N 4°22′25.56″E	Stellingmolen	1710	This drainage mill was working until 1924, when it was dismantled and truncated. It was rebuilt and restored in 2012.	
Brandersmolen or Gekroonde Brandersketel; 51°54′53″N 4°23′46″E	Stellingmolen	1711	This malt mill was demolished in 1871.	
Clopmolen; 51°55′06″N 4°23′31″E	Grondzeiler		This hemp-beating mill was marked on maps dated 1598 and 1632.	
De Batavier; 51°54′54″N 4°24′08″E	Stellingmolen	1797	This malt mill worked until 1900 when the cap was removed. Shortly afterwas the tower was reduced to a stump, which was demolished between December 1906 and January 1907.	
De Cleenpoldermolen, Kethel; 51°23′38″N 4°23′32″E	Wipmolen		A drainage mill was marked on a map of 1611. This was a small mill. It was demolished in 1903.	
De Drie Koornbloemen; 51°55′3.53″N 4°23′33.64″E	Stellingmolen	1770	This corn, pearl barley and saw mill worked until 1970. It was restored in 1976.	
De Eendragt; 51°54′57″N 4°24′09″E	Stellingmolen	1778	A malt mill, it was demolished in 1907.	
De Gapert; 51°54′49″N 4°23′55″E	Standerdmolen	1634	This corn mill had gone by 1694.	
De Gapert; 51°54′49″N 4°23′55″E	Stellingmolen	1711	This corn and malt mill was burnt out on 24 January 1864. It was replaced by a steam mill with the same name.	Foundation stone of De Gapert
De Hoop or Jefferson's Molen; 51°54′48″N 4°24′02″E	Stellingmolen	1727	This malt mill was partly demolished in 1900, leaving a five-storey stump which was demolished in 1907.	
De Kameel; 51°55′11″N 4°24′06″E	Stellingmolen	1715	This malt mill was working until the cap and sails were blown off on 20 March 1865. The tower was demolished in January 1868.	
De Kameel; 51°55′10″N 4°24′4.17″E	Stellingmolen	2010	This corn mill also generates electricity. It stands close to the site of the original De Kameel.	
De Kopermolen; 51°54′31″N 4°22′57″E	Unknown	1781	This drainage mill was last mentioned in 1783.	
De Meyboom, De Meijboom, De Meiboom; 51°54′51″N 4°24′08″E	stellingmolen	1779	This corn mill was demolished in 1860, leaving a three storey stump, which was demolished in 1926.	
De Morgenzon; 51°54′26″N 4°24′30″E	Stellingmolen	1780	This mill was built as a cement mill. It was later a white lead mill and a snuff mill. It was demolished c. 1810.	
De Nieuwe Palmboom; 51°55′14.61″N 4°23′55.37″E	Stellingmolen	1992	This corn mill was built of the stump of the original De Palmboom.	
De Nolet; 51°54′27.18″N 4°24′29.61″E	Stellingmolen	2005	It looks like a Schiedam windmill, but it's in fact a disguised wind turbine.	
De Noord; 51°55′13.81″N 4°23′49.01″E	Stellingmolen	1803	This corn mill worked until 1937, when it was dismantled leaving the tower standing. It was restored in 1962. It is the tallest windmill in the world.	
De Palmboom; 51°55′15″N 4°23′55″E	Stellingmolen	1781	This malt and rye mill was burnt out on 19 August 1901. It was subsequently demolished leaving a two storey stump. A third storey was added in 1955. De Nieuwe Palmboom was built on the stump in 1987-89.	
De Ploeg or Ploegmolen; 51°54′29″N 4°24′27″E	Stellingmolen	1782	A pearl barley mill, also later a malt mill. Demolished in 1902.	
De Steene Moole; 51°54′51″N 4°24′07″E	Stellingmolen	1683	This corn mill was demolished in 1773. De Meyboom was built to replace it.	
De Ster or Starremolen; 51°55′08″N 4°23′35″E	Stellingmolen	1716	A distillery mill, it was burnt down in 1823.	
De Vlijt; 51°54′35″N 4°24′33″E	Paltrokmolen	1788	This saw mill was demolished in 1880.	
De Vrijheid; 51°55′11.09″N 4°23′41.26″E	Stellingmolen	1785	This corn mill worked until c.1950. It was restored in 1972.	
De Walvisch; 51°54′56.4″N 4°23′42.59″E	Stellingmolen	1794	This corn mill was damaged by fire on 9 December 1938, the bottom four floors were severely affected. It was restored in 1970 but was burnt out on 14 February 1996. The mill was restored in 1998.	
De Washington, De Wilhelmina; 51°55′01″N 4°24′09″E	Stellingmolen	1792	This malt mill was renamed De Wilhelmina in 1898. It was demolished October–November 1903.	
De Wipmolen or De Beukmolen; 51°55′15″N 4°23′55″E	Wipstellingmolen	1709	A drainage mill that burnt down on 5 August 1733.	
De Witte or Witte Molen; 51°55′06″N 4°24′08″E	Stellingmolen	1792	A malt mill, it was demolished in 1892.	
Hargmolen, Kethel; 51°55′51″N 4°23′01″E	Grondzeiler		This drainage mill was standing in 1479. It burnt down in 1574.	
Hargmolen, Kethel; 51°55′51″N 4°23′01″E	Grondzeiler	1575	This drainage mill was demolished in 1877.	
Hargmolen, Kethel; 51°55′51″N 4°23′01″E	Grondzeiler	1877	This drainage mill was moved here from Kortenoord, South Holland. It was demolished in 1925. It was replaced by a diesel powered pump. The base survives, used as a dwelling.	
Kleine Babbersmolen, Kethel; 51°54′45″N 4°22′24″E	Wipmolen		A drainage mill was marked on a map dated 1611. It was not marked on a map of 1712.	
Kleine Babbersmolen, Kethel; 51°54′45″N 4°22′24″E	Grondzeiler	1852	This drainage mill was demolished at the start of the C20th.	
Korenmolen van Symon Bouman	Unknown		This corn mill was sold in 1607-08 and rebuilt elsewhere as a drainage mill.	
Molen van Bregman, Kethel; 51°55′30″N 4°22′50″E	Stellingmolen	1879	This corn mill worked by wind until 1924. The tower was reduced to a three storey stump in 1936. It stands today, used as a dwelling.	
Nieuwlandsche Poldermolen, Kethel en Spaland; 51°55′15″N 4°22′40″E	Grondzeiler		A drainage mill was marked on a map of 1560 The grondzeiler here was demolished in 1888 and replaced by a larger mill.	
Nieuwlandsche Poldermolen, Kethel en Spaland; 51°55′15″N 4°22′40″E	Grondzeiler	1888	This drainage mill was moved here from Ouderkerk aan den IJssel, South Holland. It was burnt down by German forces on 5 October 1944.	
Nieuw Mathenessermolen; 51°54′40″N 4°24′49″E	Wipmolen		A drainage mill was standing on this site in 1560.	
Nieuw Mathenessermolen; 51°54′40″N 4°24′49″E	Grondzeiler	1791	This drainage mill was demolished in 1923.	
Noirtmolen, Noortcoornmolen, Noordmolen; 51°55′13″N 4°23′52″E	Standerdmolen		A mill stood on this site in 1446. A corn mill that stood here was demolished in 1707, and was replaced by a stellingmolen.	
Noordmolen, Kethel; 51°57′31″N 4°23′45″E	Unknown	1576	A drainage mill here was struck by lightning and burnt down on 6 November 1834.	
Noordmolen, Kethel; 51°57′31″N 4°23′45″E	Grondzeiler	1834	This drainage mill was demolished in 1872. It was replaced by a steam-powered pumping station.	
Noort Moole; 51°55′13″N 4°23′52″E	Stellingmolen	1711	This was originally a corn mill, later it was a malt mill. It was demolished in 1803 and replaced by a larger mill built 50 metres (55 yd) to the north west.	
Oostmolen; 51°55′04″N 4°24′07″E	Stellingmolen	1727	This malt mill was demolished in 1899, leaving a two storey stump which was used as a packhouse for bananas. The stump was demolished in 1962.	
Oud Burgemeester Knappert; 51°54′26″N 4°24′40″E	Stellingmolen	1862	A saw mill, the smock was demolished in 1910 when a steam engine took over. The rest was demolished in 1965.	
Oud Mathenesserpoldermolen; 51°55′27″N 4°24′31″E	Wipmolen		A drainage mill was built in 1469. The wipmolen on this site was demolished in 1780 to make way for a grondzeiler.	
Oud Mathenesserpoldermolen; 51°55′27″N 4°24′31″E	Grondzeiler, later stellingmolen	1780	This drainage mill was heightened in 1888. It was demolished in 1910 and replaced by a steam-powered pumping station.	
Schravemolen; 51°55′50″N 4°24′29″E	Grondzeiler	c.1560	This drainage mill worked until 1897, when a steam engine was built to drain the 's-Gravenlandsepolder. It was subsequently demolished.	
's-Gravelandse polder molen 51°55′35″N 4°24′32″E	Wipmolen		A drainage mill was marked on a map dated 1560. It had gone by 1611.	
Suytwintcorenmolen; 51°54′51″N 4°24′05″E	Standerdmolen		A mill stood on this site in 1383. In 1683, a mill on this site was demolished. It was replaced by De Steenen Molen.	
West Abtsemolen; 51°55′55″N 4°23′05″E	Grondzeiler		A drainage mill stood on this site in 1479. The mill here was raised in 1739. It was demolished in 1875.	
West Abtsemolen; 51°55′55″N 4°23′05″E	Grondzeiler	1875	This drainage mill was raised in 1893. It was demolished in 1924 and replaced by a diesel-powered pump. The base was left, which survives as a dwelling.	
West Frankenland Poldermolen; 51°54′14″N 4°24′21″E	Unknown		This mill drained the West Frankenland Polder. It was standing in 1834.	
Westmolen; 51°54′59″N 4°23′39″E	Standerdmolen	1580	This corn mill was replaced by a stellingmolen in 1709.	
Westmolen; 51°54′59″N 4°23′39″E	Stellingmolen	1711	This malt mill was demolished in 1869. A steam-powered mill was built on its site in 1870.	
Wijk Ten Toorn or Wijk den Toorn; 51°54′33″N 4°24′20″E	Stellingmolen	1723	This sawmill was partly dismantled in 1886-88, and was burnt down in 1912.	
Zuidmolen; 51°54′42″N 4°24′08″E	Stellingmolen	1717	This malt and tanning mill was burnt out in 1835. The remains had been demolished by 1846.	
Zuidmolen, Kethel; 51°57′02″N 4°23′42″E		c.1557	The Zuidmolen was marked on a map dated 1557. It was destroyed in 1574.	
Zuidmolen, Kethel; 51°57′02″N 4°23′42″E		1574	The mill was built in 1574. It was replaced by a new mill in 1828.	
Zuidmolen, Kethel; 51°57′02″N 4°23′42″E	Grondzeiler	1828	The drainage mill was built in 1828. It ceased to work in 1884. The smock burnt down on 13 April 1954, leaving a single storey base used as a house. This was demolished on 19 September 2005 and a new two-storey octagonal house built on the site.	
