= Spremberg Wind Park =

Wind farm in Brandenburg, Germany

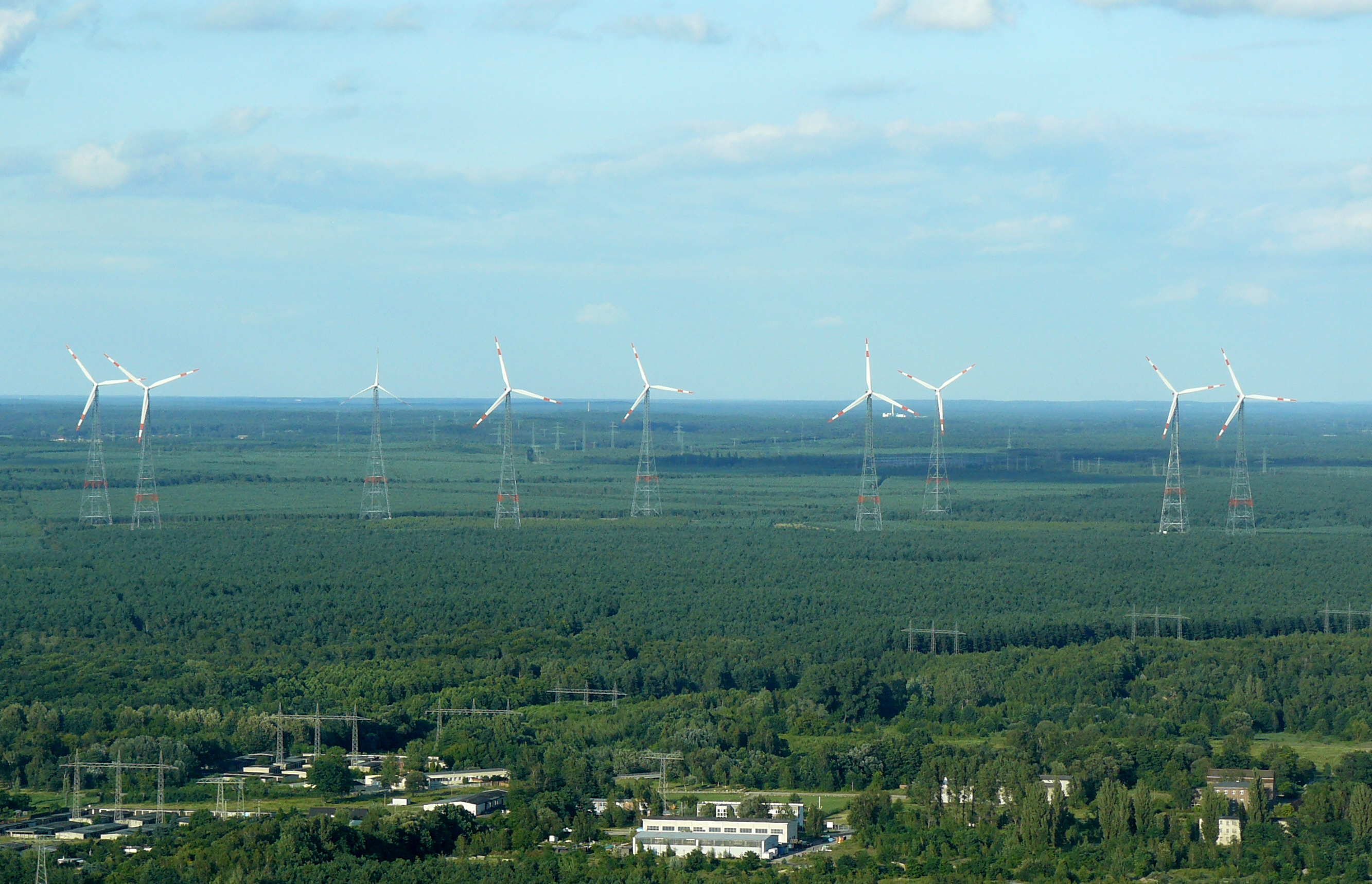
- Country: Germany
- Coordinates: 51°32′47″N 14°25′28″E
- Status: Operational
- Commission date: 19 May 2009

Wind farm
- Hub height: 141 m (463 ft)
- Rotor diameter: 100 m (330 ft)

Power generation
- Units operational: 9 × 2.5 MW
- Make and model: Fuhrländer FL-2500/100 (9)
- Nameplate capacity: 22.5 MW

External links
- Commons: Related media on Commons

Windpark Spremberg is a nine-turbine, 22.5-megawatt wind farm located about 5 kilometres (3.1 mi) east of the city centre, and on a hill within the city forest, of Spremberg in Brandenburg, Germany.

Owner is the investment company Ampere Equity Fund. It acquired the complete system in April 2009 of the WSB Neue Energien GmbH Saxonia, which had come out with the advertisements for the establishment wind park of the Spremberg among 21 applicants as a winner. The park comprises nine Fuhrländer FL-2500 wind turbines with a hub height of 141 metres (463 ft) and a rotor diameter of 100 metres (330 ft), each generating 2.5 MW, thus totalling 22.5 MW, sufficient for supplying about 60,000 residents with electricity. Per year on a generation of current by approximately 55 GWh one counts. After completion the wind park Spremberg is the highest latticed mast wind park of the world. At present highest individual latticed mast windwheel of the world is the Fuhrländer Wind Turbine Laasow. The wind park Spremberg forms a descriptive contrast to the brown coal power station black one pump in range of vision. After present planning the wind park is to be extended starting from 2012 by further eight plants.

== Construction ==
In the year 2003 the area of the current wind park Spremberg was proven as area for wind-power plants. Over the final overall height there were Spremberg to last different opinions between the operator company and the city. The city Spremberg demanded that the wind energy plants do not exceed an overall height of 180 metres (590 ft). The WSB new energies GmbH, which had come out as a winner of the advertisement among 21 competitors, recorded however to the original plans to establish wind energy plants of up to 195 m overall height. Only in December 2006 the Spremberger decided town council to give the demanded overall height of 195 metres (640 ft) instead of. In January 2008 the foundations for the planned nine wind energy plants were manufactured. With the establishment of the latticed mast construction, which has a weight of 350 tonnes (770 thousand pounds), in September 2008 one began. The first latticed mast, still without car and wing, stood on 12 September 2008. On 6 October 2008 this became by the parts, like rotors, already pre-mounted at the ground, machine building (with generator, transmission, transformer and the complete control) as well as rotor blades, which together a weight of approximately 60 tonnes (130 thousand pounds) (rotor) and/or 96 tonnes (210 thousand pounds) (car) have, completes. On 17 April 2009 becomes admits, which sold the WSB Neue Energien GmbH the wind park Spremberg to 100% to the Dutch investment company Ampere Equity Fund. After all acceptance tests successfully ran, the wind park Spremberg became to 19. May 2009 with a symbolic mains connection taken in enterprise. The total investment sum amounts to approximately 35 million euros.

== Special Features ==
The wing with an overall length, necessary for the wind-power plants, of in each case 50 metres (160 ft) had to be transported with the delivery by the city center over the market place of Spremberg. This way made itself necessary, since all other approach roads did not exhibit the necessary turning radius. To the establishment of the wind-power plants the largest mobile truck crane in the world was used. Its structure takes about two weeks and the necessary parts is distributed thereby on 30 heavy load transporters.
