= Kethel =

- Kethel, the village at the origin of Kethel en Spaland (a former municipality in the Netherlands).
- Alexander Kethel (1832–1916), a Scottish-born Australian politician and timber merchant
- Joseph Alexander Kethel (1866–1946), Australian architect (son of Alexander)
