= Nieuwland, Kortland, en 's-Graveland =

Coordinates: 51°55′13″N 4°23′11″E

Nieuwland, Kortland, en 's-Graveland (often abbreviated to "Nieuwland c.a.") is a former municipality in the Dutch province of South Holland. It was located on three sides of the city of Schiedam. The municipality existed between 1817 and 1855.

The municipality consisted of three polders: Kortland, west of Schiedam; Nieuwland, north of the city; and 's-Graveland, northeast of the city. Nieuwland is now the name of a neighbourhood of Schiedam, located in the former municipality.

According to the 19th-century historian A.J. van der Aa, Nieuwland c.a. had about 330 inhabitants.
