= Ketel One =

Dutch vodka brand

- Type: Vodka
- Manufacturer: Nolet Distillery
- Distributor: Nolet Distillery (50% ownership); Diageo (50% ownership)
- Country of origin: Schiedam, Netherlands
- Introduced: 1983; 42 years ago
- Proof (US): 80
- Variants: Regular, Citron, Oranje
- Website: http://www.ketelone.com

Ketel One is a vodka brand of the Nolet Distillery in Schiedam, Netherlands. Ketel One Vodka is distilled from 100% wheat in copper pot stills (Ketel is Dutch for pot still), filtered over loose charcoal, and rests in tile-lined tanks until ready. Ketel One Vodka is named after the original copper pot still, "Distilleerketel #1." The alcohol content of this spirit is 40% (80 proof (US), 70 degrees proof (international)). The Nolet Distillery also makes Ketel One Citroen, Ketel One Oranje, Ketel One Botanical (in the varietals Peach & Orange Blossom, Cucumber & Mint, and Grapefruit Rose) and Ketel 1 Jenever.

Ketel One and the Nolet Distillery is 50% owned by the Nolet Family, and 50% owned by Diageo, which acquired its stake in 2009 for $900 million USD.

== History ==
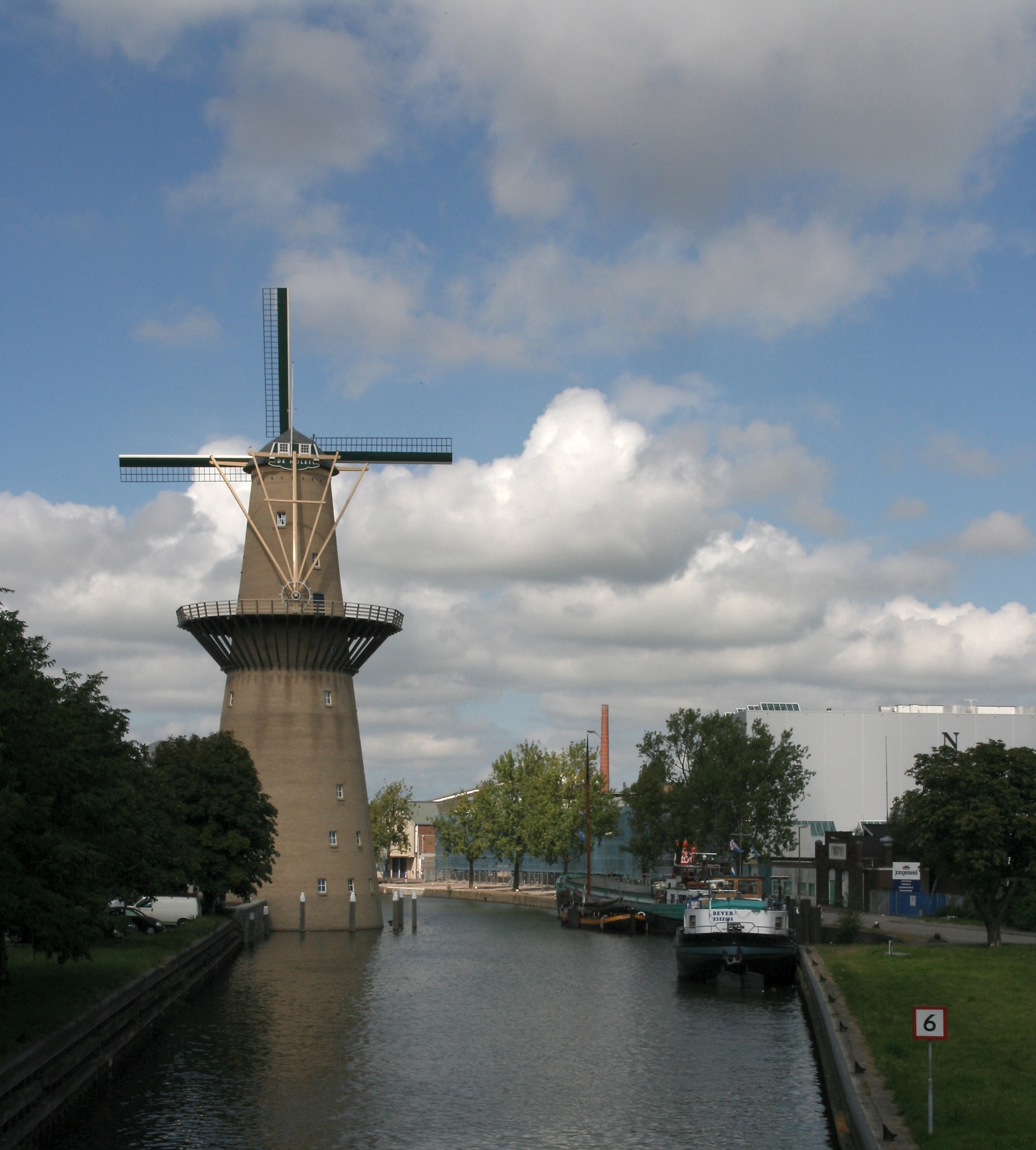
The Nolet windmill at the distillery in Schiedam

=== 17th century ===
Ketel One is produced by the Nolet Distillery in Schiedam, Netherlands. The Nolet Distillery was founded in 1691 by the Nolet family, French Huguenot refugees, and has remained in the Nolet family ever since. Ketel One is so named for the original coal-fired copper still that was used to distill it, Distilleerketel #1.

=== 18th century ===
In 1794, a windmill known as "the Whale" was built on the property. In 1867 the family began to focus on exporting their products.

=== 19th century ===
The town of Schiedam has long been known for the alcohol industry. By the end of the 19th century the town boasted over 400 distilleries.

=== 20th century ===
The Nolet Family opened a distillery in the United States in 1902 and sold vodka under the Imperial Eagle Vodka brand name. Nolet were forced to close it during the prohibition era, with Joannes Nolet forced to flee the country.

The distillery industry in Schiedam was hit hard by World War II, and by the end of the war only 40 distilleries were left. Within the next few years changes in technology and consolidations and mergers left Nolet as the only distillery still operating in Schiedam.

When Carolus Nolet (1941–), the tenth generation of the family to own the company, took over for his father in 1979, the company made a wide range of spirits. He made the decision to focus on one product, and make it the best it could be. The company began producing jenever exclusively. Ketel 1 Jenever quickly became the best selling Jenever brand in the Netherlands. At that point the company began to look at returning to the United States market. Carolus began to develop a vodka designed specially for the American market, focusing on quality.

Nolet returned to the U.S. market in 1983, launching Ketel One Vodka in San Francisco at the BIX Restaurant and Supper Club. Rather than advertising directly to consumers, the company encouraged bartenders and distributors to sell their product. In 1991 Carl Nolet Jr. moved to the U.S. and founded Nolet Spirits USA. Between 2000 and 2010 the company released two flavored vodkas, Ketel One Citroen and Ketel One Oranje.

Sales of Ketel One increased from 7,000 cases in 1992–1993 to 250,000 cases worldwide in 1997.

=== 21st century ===
Ketel One reached sales of one million cases worldwide in 2002. In 2003 the company launched its first advertising campaign, thanking Ketel One drinkers. By 2008 the company was selling close to two million cases per year.

In 2008, Diageo announced an investment of $900 million in a joint venture with the owners of Ketel One, with the Nolet family continuing ownership of the distillery in Schiedam.

In 2009 the brand attracted attention for its first television commercials, which seemed "tailor-made" for the post-Great Recession economy. Despite being sold in 25 countries, up until 2008 the United States was the only country where the company advertised.

In 2014, The New York Times cited the Brand Keys Customer Loyalty Engagement Index as having the Ketel One brand at number 2, behind only Grey Goose among vodkas.
