= Oud- en Nieuw-Mathenesse =

Municipality in the Netherlands from 1817 to 1868

Coordinates: 51°54′48″N 4°25′10″E

Oud- en Nieuw-Mathenesse is a former municipality in the Dutch province of South Holland. It was located to the west of Schiedam.

The municipality existed between 1817 and 1868, when it merged with Schiedam. The area is now divided between Schiedam and Rotterdam, and is completely covered by residential areas and the Merwehaven port.
