= De Noord =

Windmill in Schiedam, Netherlands

Coordinates: 51.9205°N 4.3970°E

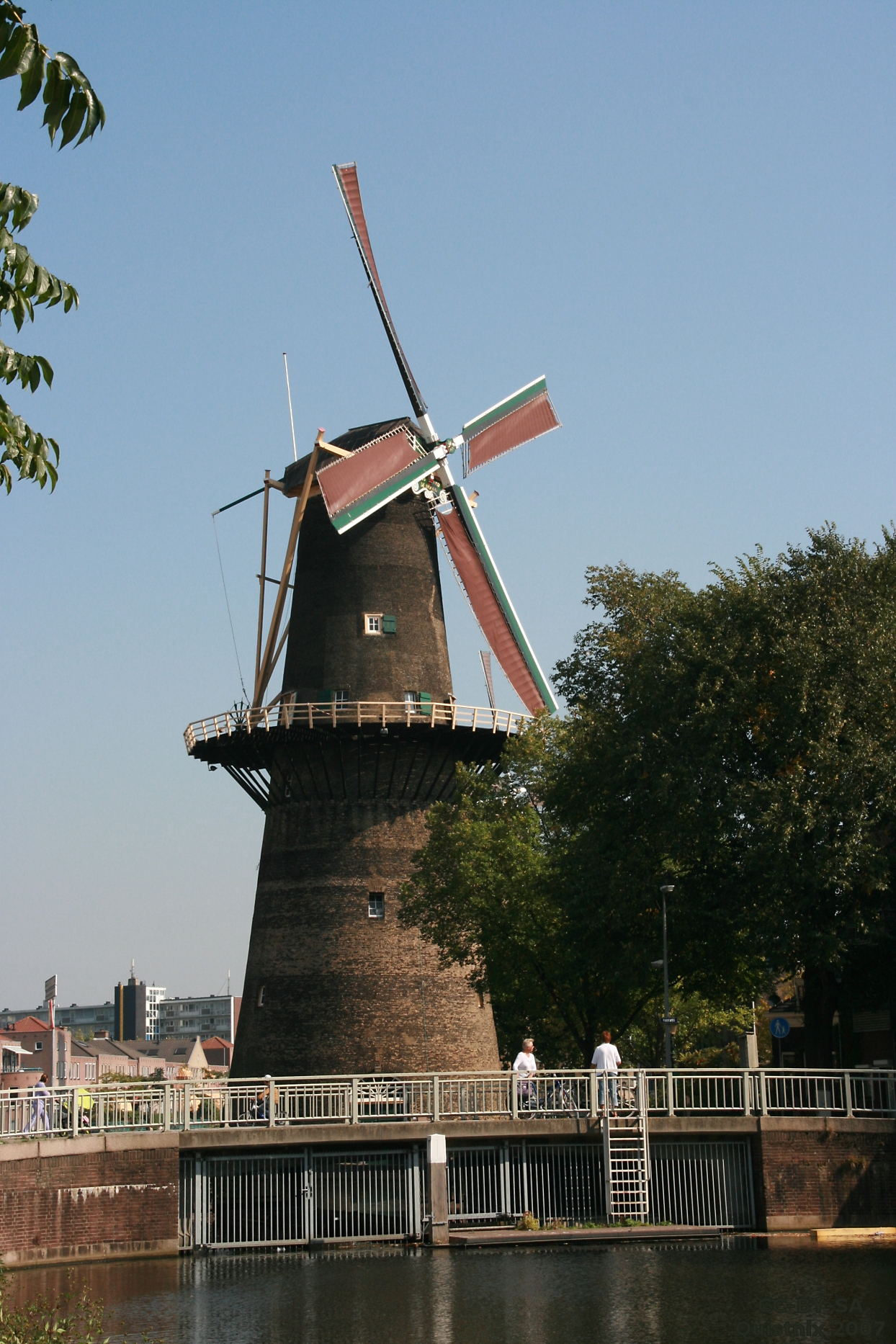
De Noord

Dutch: De Noord (meaning 'the North') is a windmill located on the Noordvest 38 in Schiedam, Netherlands. It is known as the tallest historic working traditional building in the world with a roof height of 33.3 metres (109 ft) and a wing span of 26.6 metres (87 ft). The mill is one of the five remaining windmills in Schiedam, and has been a national monument (number 32716) since 29 May 1969. Today De Noord houses a restaurant.

== History ==
Before the current windmill was built in 1803 as a gristmill, a wooden post mill was built in this location around 1400. In 1707, the wooden post mill was torn down and replaced with a stone mill. When this became too small, De Noord was built. In 1930, a diesel engine was added inside the windmill to keep production going when there was no wind. The engine is currently at the 's-Gravelandseweg in Schiedam. In the 1930s, usage of wind energy became less common, leading to the dismantling of De Noord in 1937. The beams, capstan wheel, cap, sail-cross and railings were all removed at that time.

During World War II, the stump that remained of De Noord was used as a watch post by the Germans. After the war, the Schiedam municipality bought the mill with the intention to restore it to grind again. The first phase of restoration began in 1962, restoring the sail-cross, cap, tie beams, railing and capstan wheel. Roughly ten years later, the windmill was functioning again.

Today, De Noord is a restaurant and bar serving a wide range of food and drinks.

== See also ==
- List of windmills in Schiedam
- De Noord (Rotterdam), a similarly named windmill in Rotterdam which was demolished in 1954
- Fuhrländer Wind Turbine Laasow, tallest wind turbine in the world
