= Fuhrländer Wind Turbine Laasow =

Wind turbine in Brandenburg, Germany

Coordinates: 51°43′14″N 14°06′24″E

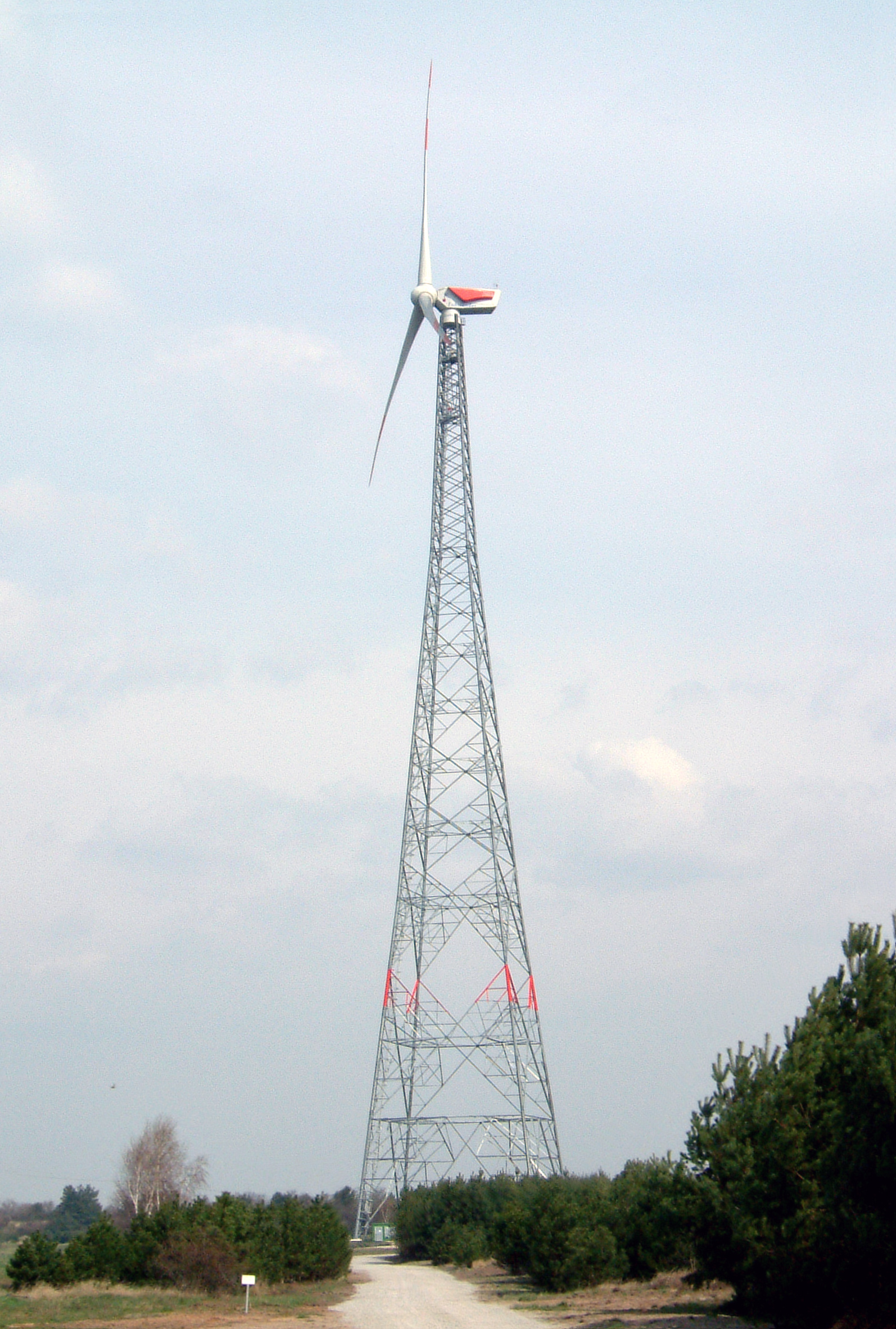
Fuhrländer wind turbine Laasow

Fuhrländer Wind Turbine Laasow is a wind turbine, built in 2006 by German wind turbine manufacturer Fuhrländer near the village of Laasow, Brandenburg, Germany.

== Overview ==
It consists of a 160-metre (520 ft) lattice tower, which carries a rotor 90 metres (300 ft) in diameter. Until two slightly taller wind turbines opened in Poland in 2012, this wind turbine was the tallest wind turbine in the world. Its power output is 2.5 MW.

== See also ==
- List of tallest buildings and structures in the world
- Wind power in Germany
- De Noord, tallest traditional windmill in the world
- De Nolet, tallest "windmill", but actually is a disguised wind turbine
