= Kethel en Spaland =

Municipality in South Holland, Netherlands

Coordinates: 51°56′38″N 4°23′13″E

Kethel en Spaland is a former municipality in the Dutch province of South Holland. It was located to the north of the city of Schiedam, and covered the village of Kethel and the hamlet Kandelaar.

Kethel en Spaland was a separate municipality until 1941, when it merged with Schiedam.

The municipality had a population of 1,450 in 1868 and within the historical limits currently live 15,260 people. The former municipal flag consists of a horizontal tricolor, orange-black-orange, at a 2:1:2 ratio. The flag was designed after the coat of arms, depicting a black cauldron.
