= Schiedam =

City and Municipality in South Holland, Netherlands

- City and municipality
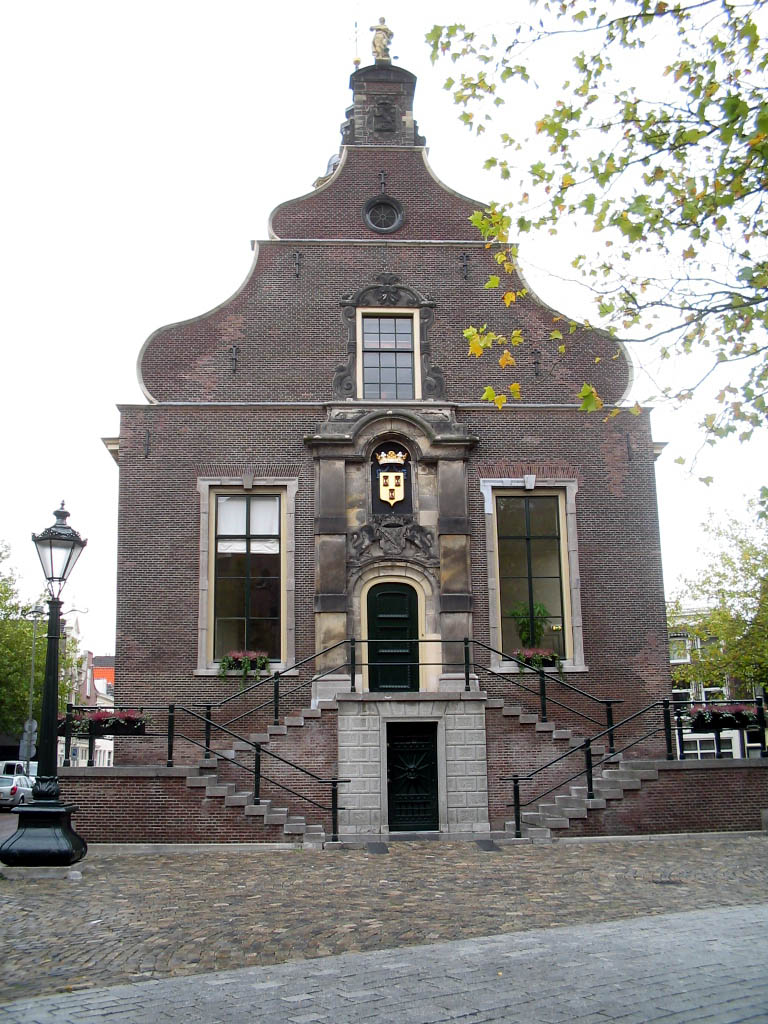
- Old city hall of Schiedam

- Flag Coat of arms
- Nickname: Brandersstad
- Location in South Holland
- Coordinates: 51°55′N 4°24′E
- Country: Netherlands
- Province: South Holland
- Settled: c. 1230
- City rights: 1275

Government
  - Body: Municipal council
  - Mayor: Harald Bergmann (VVD)

Area
  - Total: 19.86 km^{2} (7.67 sq mi)
  - Land: 17.82 km^{2} (6.88 sq mi)
  - Water: 2.04 km^{2} (0.79 sq mi)
- Elevation: −1 m (−3.3 ft)

Population (January 2026)
  - Total: 81,931
  - Density: 4,598/km^{2} (11,910/sq mi)
- Demonym: Schiedammer
- Time zone: UTC+1 (CET)
  - Summer (DST): UTC+2 (CEST)
- Postcode: 3100–3125
- Area code: 010
- Website: www.schiedam.nl

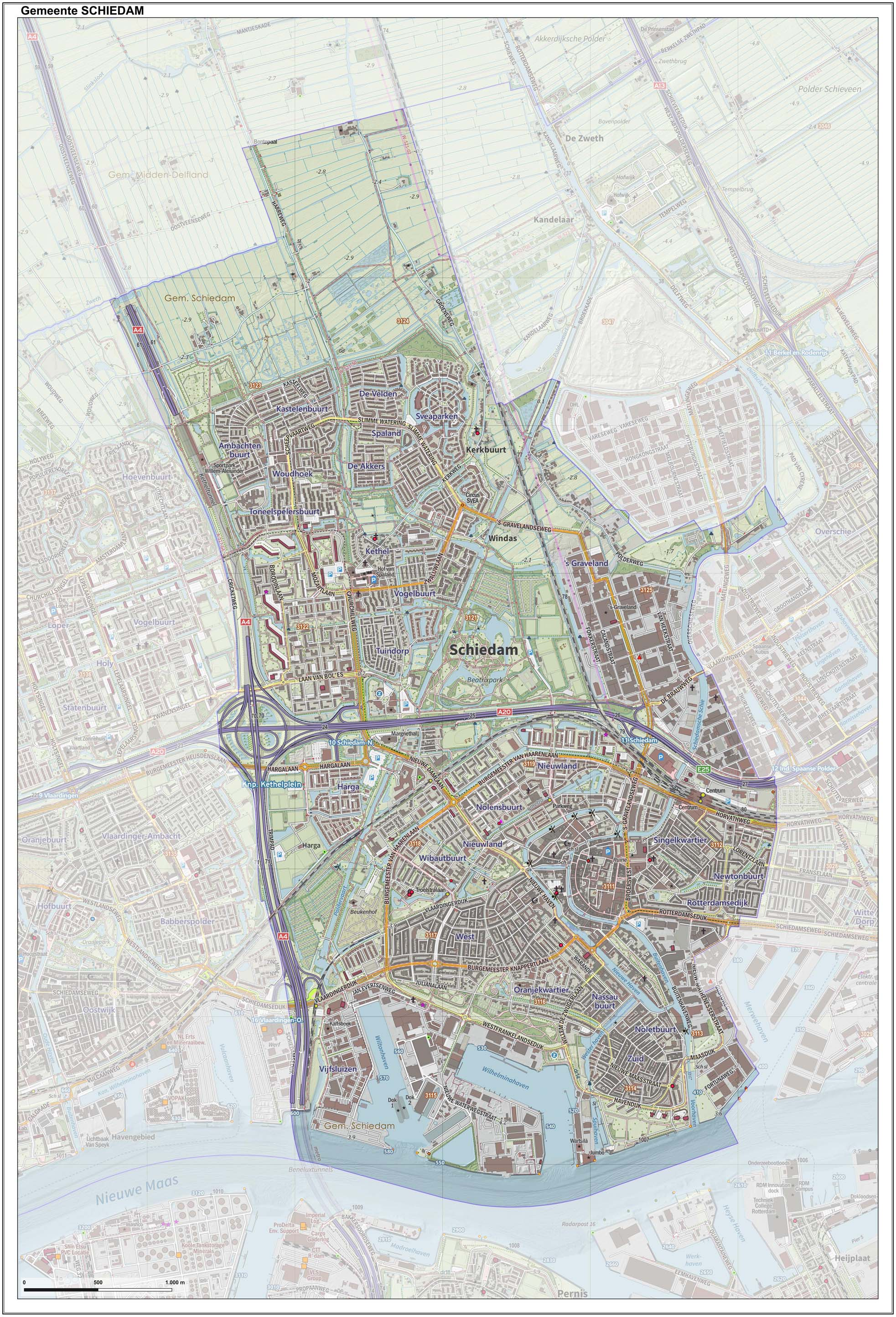
Map of Schiedam, 2016

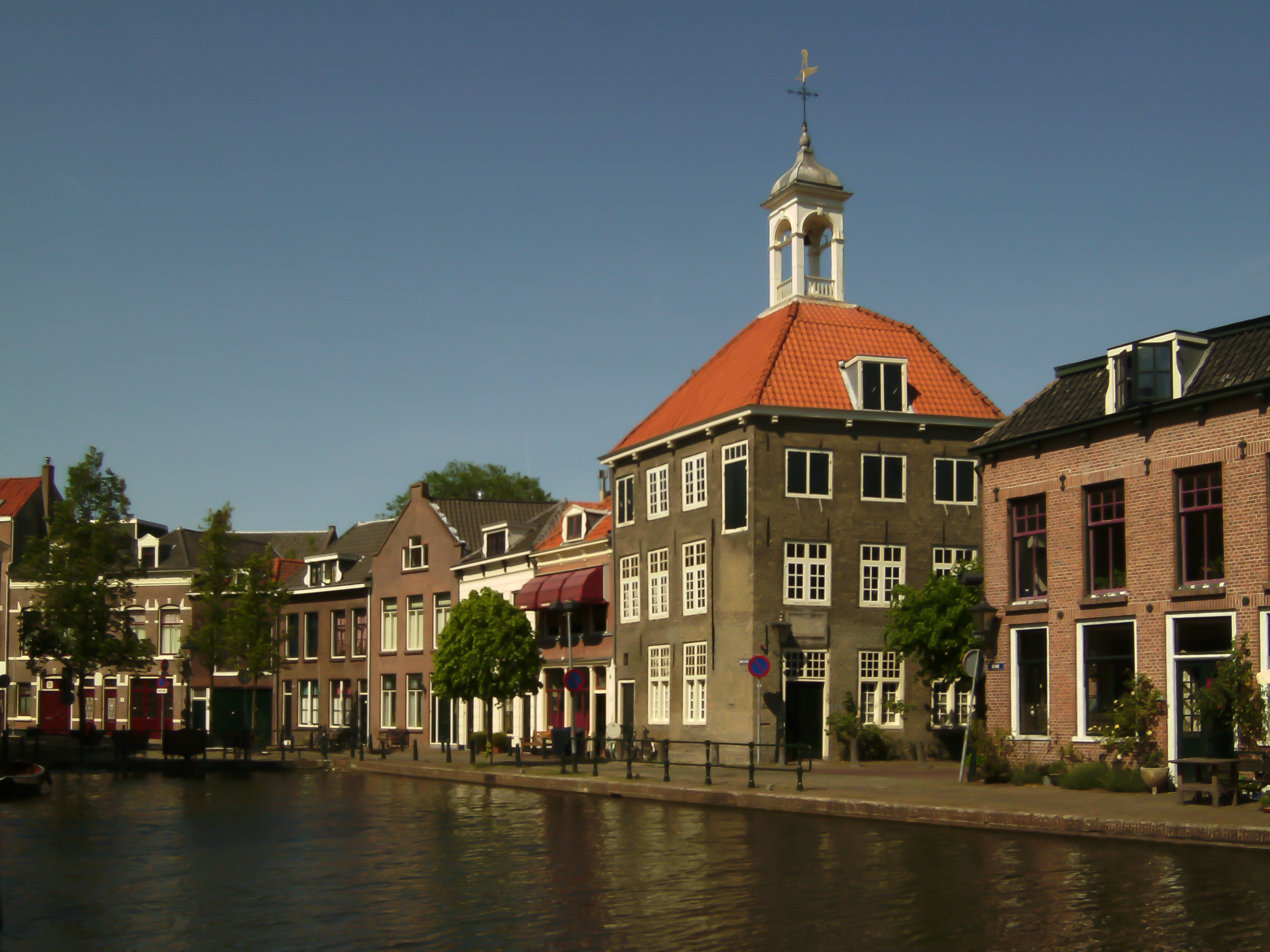
View of Schiedam with The Porters' Guild House

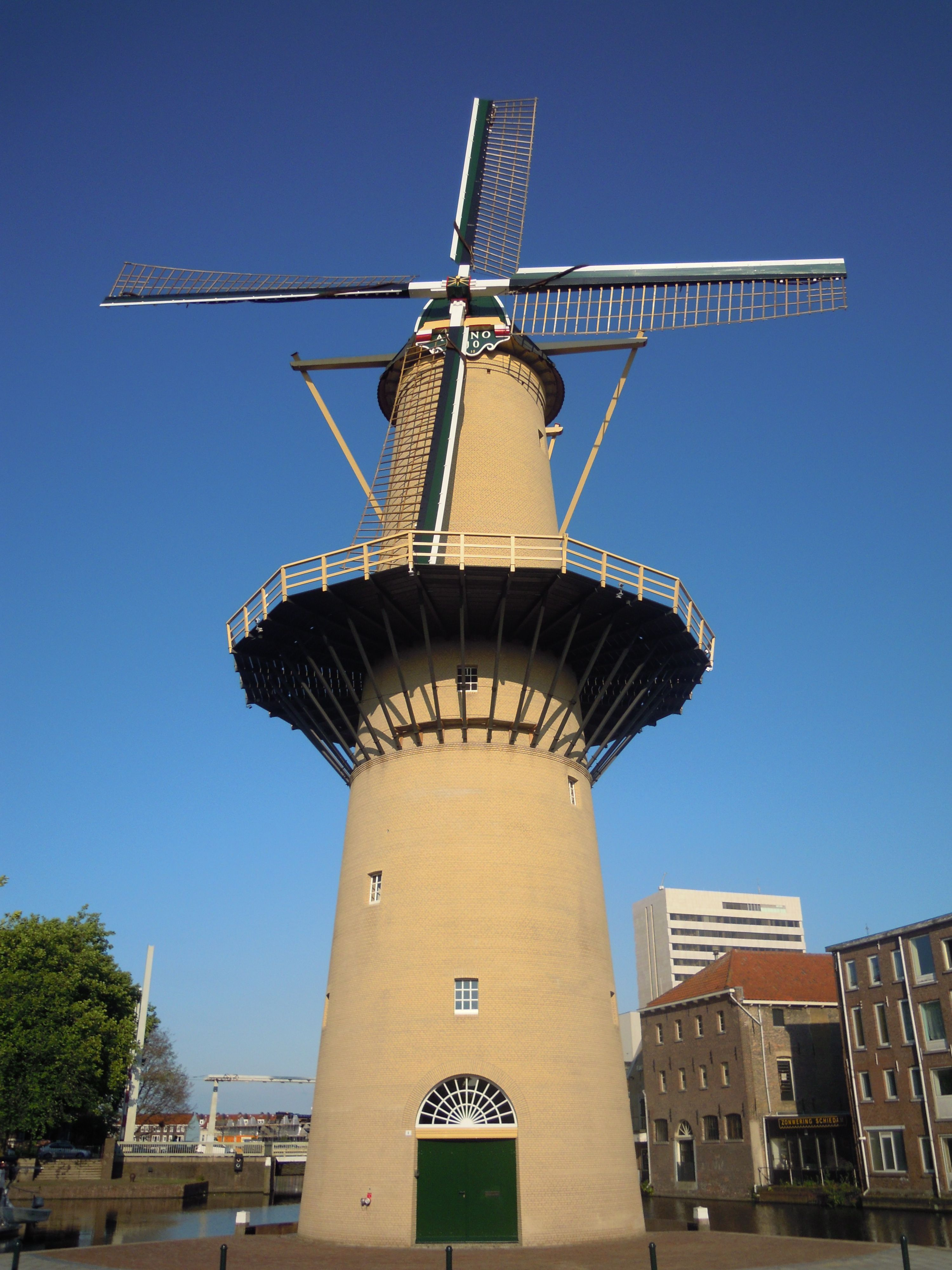
Windmill De Kameel in Schiedam

Schiedam (Dutch pronunciation: [sxiˈdɑm]) is a city and municipality in the west of the Netherlands. It is located in the Rotterdam–The Hague metropolitan area, west of the city Rotterdam, east of the town Vlaardingen, and south of the city Delft. In the south, Schiedam is also connected to the village of Pernis via the Benelux tunnel.

The city's historical center is ringed with canals and contains the tallest windmill in the world.

Schiedam is a centre for the production of jenever, including as the internationally renowned Ketel One; in French and English, the word schiedam (usually without a capital s-) refers to the city's jenever. This was the city's main industry during the early Industrial Revolution in the 18th and 19th century, a period to which it owed its former nickname "Zwart Nazareth" ("Black Nazareth").

== History ==
Schiedam was founded around the year 1230. The river Schie was dammed by the Lord of Wassenaer and the Amtlord Dirk Bokel of the Amt Mathenesse, this was to protect the existing polderland against the seawater from the North Sea. In 1247, Lady Adelaide of Holland married John I, Count of Hainaut. As a dowry she received from him the eastern part of the dam together with the adjacent polder. The dam attracted much trade activity as goods to and from the hinterland (Delft, and further away Leiden and Haarlem) had to be transhipped. A small town developed swiftly around the dam and its activities. In 1275, Schiedam received city privileges from Lady Adelaide, this in her capacity as sister of William II, the reigning Count of Holland and King of the Romans. She ordered the building of Te Riviere Castle near the Schie, which is known today as "Castle Mathenesse" (Dutch: "Huis te Riviere" or "Slot Mathenesse"). Remnants of a donjon, which were once part of the castle, are still visible today in the center of Schiedam and near the city office.

As a young settlement, Schiedam soon received competition from surrounding towns and cities: in 1340, Rotterdam and Delft also were allowed to establish a connection between the Schie and the Meuse. From the 15th century onwards, the city flourished as a place of pilgrimage due to the devotion afforded to Saint Lidwina, one of the most famous Dutch saints who lived her life in Schiedam. The city subsequently gained significance by fishing for herring. In 1428 a great fire swept through Schiedam, destroying large parts of the then wooden city.

In 1575 the world's first known commercial distillery started operations in Schiedam. The 18th century was Schiedam's Golden Age, when the gin industry flourished. The standstill in drink imports from France made the boom in Schiedam's distilleries possible. From dozens of distilleries Schiedam jenever was exported throughout the world. The gin industry gave the city its nickname "Black Nazareth". This industry is now largely gone. Five windmills in the city, called De Noord, Walvisch, Drie Koornbloemen, Nieuwe Palmboom and Vrijheid − are the highest traditional-style windmills in the world because they had to stick out above the high warehouses, and many storehouses are relics of this past. In one of the former factories at the Lange Haven the National Jenever Museum operates.

On 10 August 1856, the first major train accident in the Netherlands happened near Schiedam Centrum railway station, causing 3 deaths. On 4 May 1976 the 1976 Schiedam train accident also took place near the station, which caused 24 deaths.

At the end of the 19th and throughout the 20th century, the shipbuilding industry boomed in Schiedam, with large companies like Wilton-Fijenoord and others. In 1941, the ancient municipalities Kethel en Spaland were merged with Schiedam, which made large expansions of the city possible with residential areas in the north. At the end of the 20th century, the shipbuilding industry largely disappeared and today, Schiedam is mainly a commuter-area in the Rotterdam metropolitan area.

== Geography ==
The city of Schiedam is located in the province of South Holland. It is enclosed between Rotterdam (east), Midden-Delfland (north), Vlaardingen (west) and the river Nieuwe Maas (south).

Schiedam exists of nine districts: Centrum ('Center'), Oost ('East'), Gorzen ('South'), West ('West'), Nieuwland, Groenoord, Kethel, Woudhoek and Spaland/Sveaparken.

== Demographics ==
Schiedam has an estimated total population of 82,055 inhabitants as of 2026.

55.44% of the population has Dutch background, 14.42% has a western migration background, and 30.15% has a non-western migration background.

== Attractions ==
=== Museums ===
- Stedelijk Museum Schiedam
- Jenevermuseum (Schiedam)
- Het Borrelmuseum (in 't Spul on Hoogstraat)
- De Walvisch
- Nationaal Coöperatie Museum Schiedam / 't Winkeltje
- Artgallery 't Walvisch

=== Monuments ===
- The old city hall (Oude stadhuis (Schiedam))
- The canals of Schiedam
- The Wheat Exchange (De Korenbeurs)
- Church of Saint John (Grote of Sint-Janskerk)
- The ruins of Te Riviere Castle
- Saint Lidwina basilica
- De Plantage (park)
- The Porters' Guild House (Zakkendragershuisje (Schiedam))
- Het Proveniershuis (housing elderly people)
- The historical windmills of Schiedam. This includes the tallest windmill in the world which is used as a restaurant.

=== Events ===
- Brandersfeesten
- The National Windmill Days (Nationale Molen- & Gemalen dag)
- Monthly art exhibition at Artipico Art Gallery (maandelijkse Kunstborrel)

==== Past notable events ====
- 1856 Schiedam train accident
- 1976 Schiedam train accident
- 1976 Schiedam riots
- 2012 lip dub World record attempt

== Sport ==
The most popular sports in Schiedam are soccer and field hockey. Two of its prominent soccer clubs, SVV (Schiedamse voetbal vereniging) and Hermes, were formerly part of the Netherlands' professional football league before being relegated due to financial difficulties. Cricket is also unusually popular in Schiedam, with two cricket teams playing in the topklasse (by comparison, the Dutch capital Amsterdam only has one). Aforementioned team Hermes D.V.S. holds two topklasse titles, whilst rivals Excelsior '20 hold eleven.

== Education ==
There are about 35 schools in Schiedam. The oldest high school is the Stedelijk Gymnasium Schiedam, dating back to 1346. Other schools include Lyceum Schravenlant, Spieringshoek and Lentiz LIFE.

== Notable people ==
=== Public thinking & public service ===
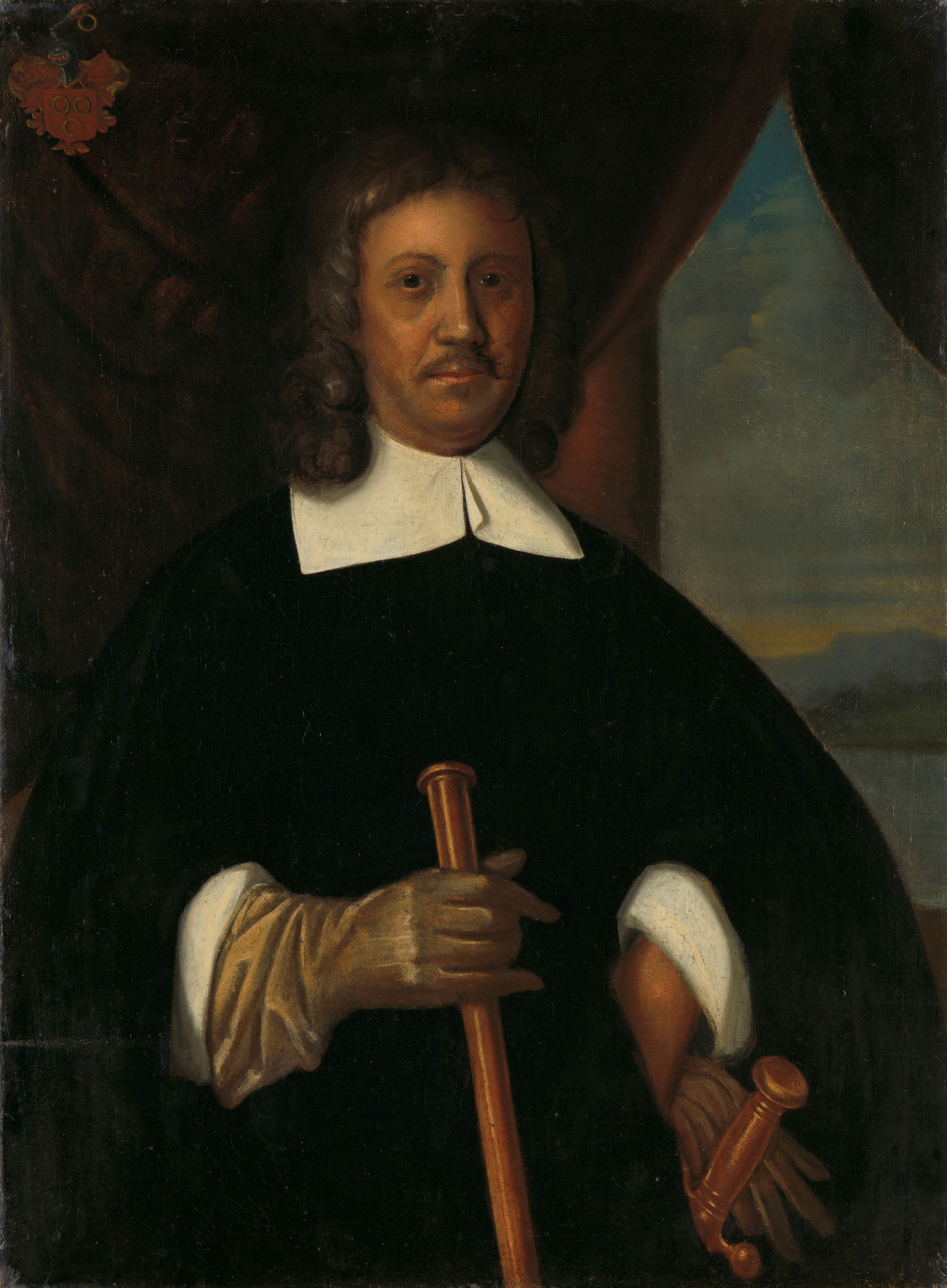
Jan van Riebeeck, grew up in Schiedam

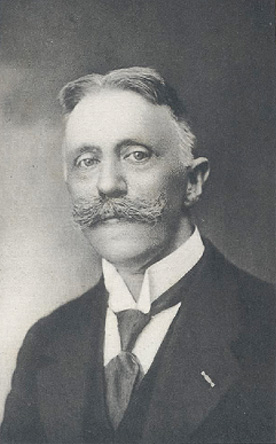
Dirk Jan de Geer, 1926

- Saint Lidwina (1380–1433) a Dutch mystic, honored as a saint by the Catholic Church.
- Jacobus Taurinus (1576–1618) a preacher and theologian, supporter of the Remonstrants
- Cornelius Haga (1578–1654) ambassador of the Dutch Republic to the Ottoman Empire
- Willem Nieupoort (1607–1678) a politician and ambassador, negotiated the Treaty of Westminster (1654)
- Jan van Riebeeck (1619–1677) colonial administrator, founded Cape Town, South Africa
- James Scott, 1st Duke of Monmouth (1649–1685) illegitimate son of Charles II of England
- Harmen van Bol'es (1689–1764) a Royal master builder in Russia, City Carpenter in Schiedam
- Engelbertus Lucas Sr. (1747–1797) a Dutch rear-admiral, commanding a squadron of the Batavian Navy
- Engelbertus Lucas Jr. (1785–1870) a senior naval officer
- Piet Paaltjens (1835–1894) a Protestant clergyman and romantic author
- Christian Osepins (1858–1887) a US Navy sailor, recipient of the Medal of Honor
- Dirk Jan de Geer (1870–1960) a politician, Dutch Prime Minister 1926/1929 and 1939/1940
- Philips Christiaan Visser (1882–1955) a diplomat, geographer, mountaineer and glaciologist
- Jeanne Lampl-de Groot (1895–1987) a psychiatrist, worked with Sigmund Freud
- Thomas van der Hammen (1924–2010) a palaeontologist, botanist and geologist
- Wil Velders-Vlasblom (1930–2019) a politician and woman's rights activist
- Pieter van Vollenhoven (born 1939) husband of Princess Margriet of the Netherlands
- Johannes Bronkhorst (1946–2025) an academic and Indologist, specialised in early Buddhism
- Elizabeth Witmer (born 1946) member of the Legislative Assembly of Ontario, Canada
- Herman Heinsbroek (born 1951) entrepreneur and former Minister of Economic Affairs
- Pieter Elbers (born 1970) an airline executive, President and CEO of KLM

=== The arts ===
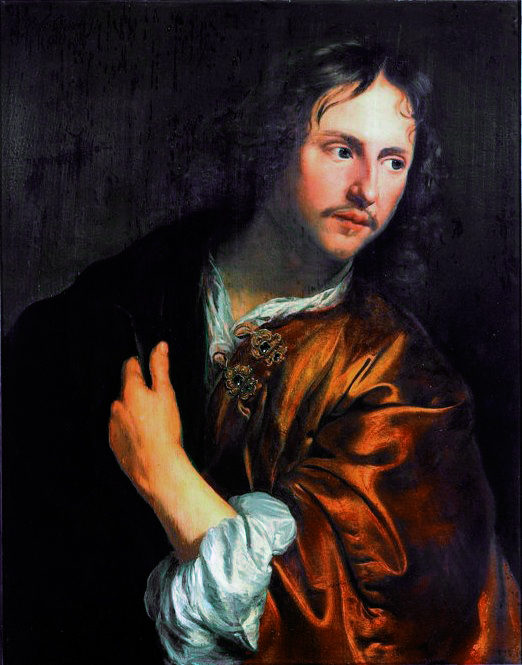
Portrait of Adam Pijnacker, 1660

- Adam Pynacker (1622–1673) Dutch Golden Age painter, mostly of landscapes
- Piet van Stuivenberg (1901–1988) sculptor, painter, lithographer and graphic artist
- Arnold van Mill (1921–1996) an opera singer who sang bass
- Wim Meuldijk (1922–2007) writer, illustrator and screenwriter; created Pipo de Clown
- Theresia van der Pant (1924–2013) a sculptor
- Gé Korsten (1927–1999) a South African singer of Dutch descent
- Rien Poortvliet (1932–1995) painter of the Gnomes book series
- Henk de Vlieger (born 1953) a percussionist, composer and arranger
- Mike Redman (born 1978) a musician, record producer and film maker
- Joey Roukens (born 1982) a composer of contemporary classical music
- Rinus Sprong (born 1959) a dancer, choreographer and television judge

=== Sport ===
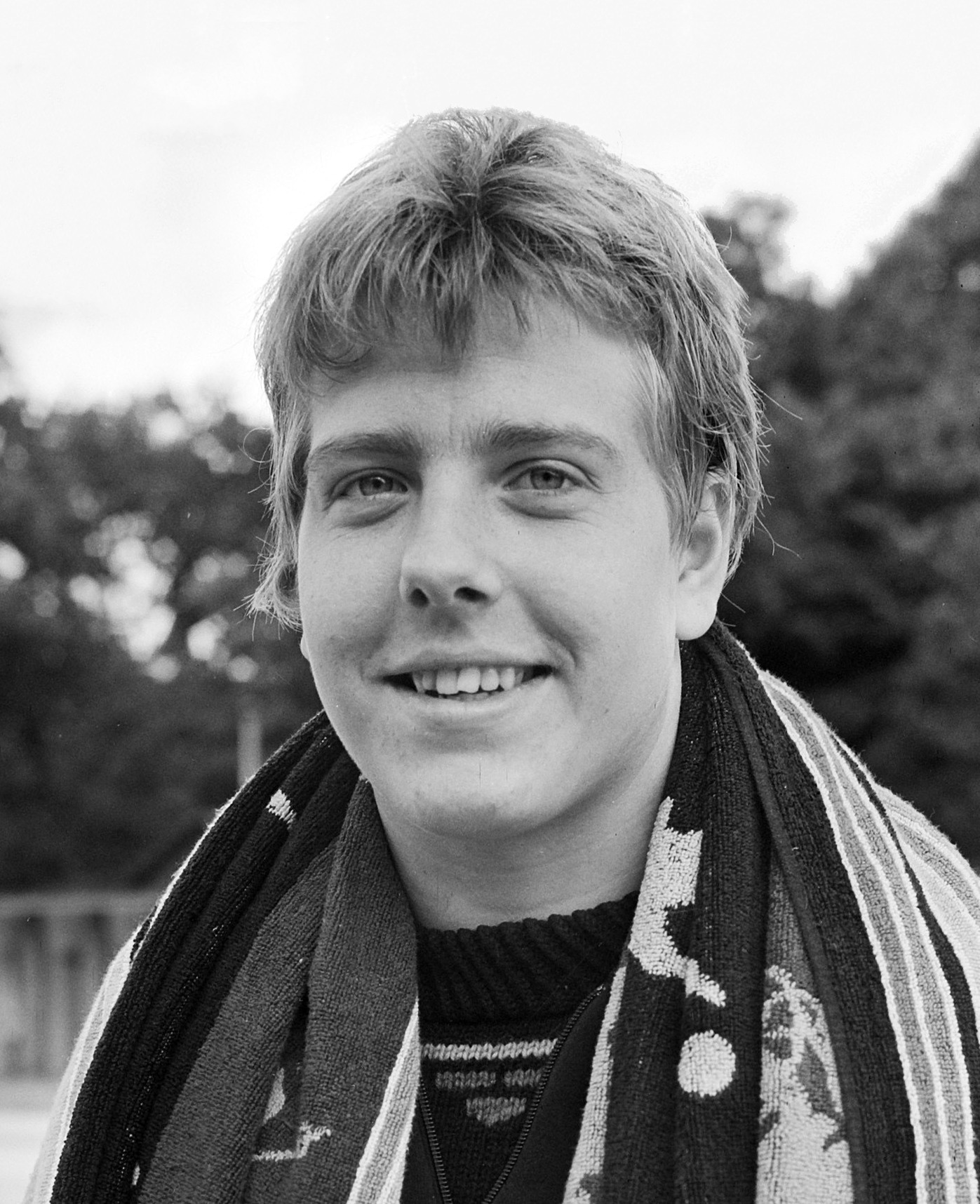
Pauline van der Wildt, 1964

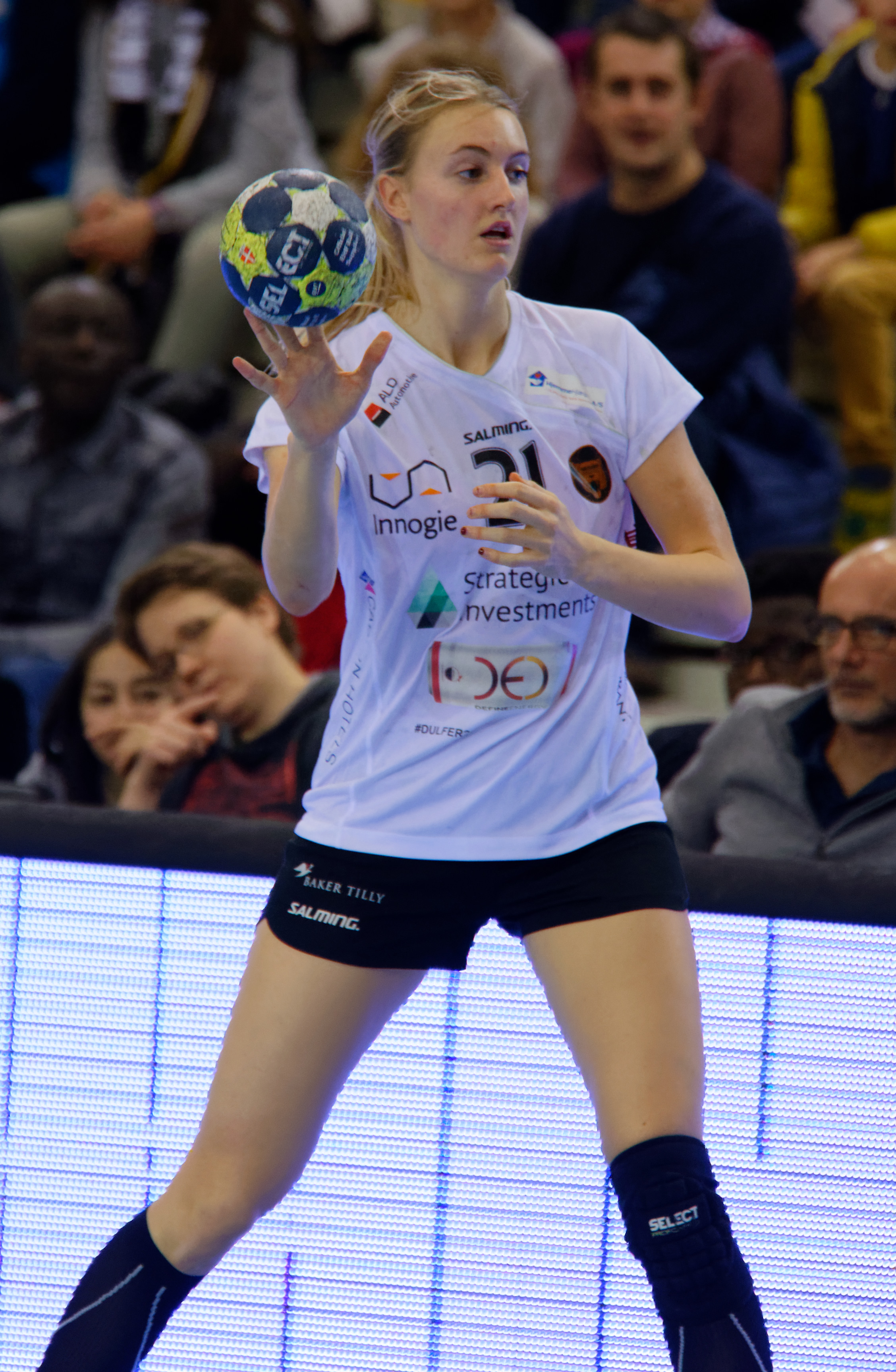
Kelly Dulfer, 2018

- Rinus Gosens (1920–2008) a football player and manager
- Hans Eijkenbroek (1940–2024) a footballer with 339 club caps and manager
- Pauline van der Wildt (born 1944) a retired Dutch swimmer, team bronze medallist at the 1964 Summer Olympics
- Yvonne Buter (born 1959) a former Dutch field hockey goalkeeper, team bronze medallist at the 1988 Summer Olympics
- John de Wolf (born 1962) a former professional footballer with over 350 club caps
- Angela Venturini (born 1964) a former cricketer
- Willem Noorduin (born 1967) a Paralympian athlete and Olympic medallist
- Robin van der Laan (born 1968) a former footballer with 401 club caps and manager
- Robert Maaskant (born 1969) a former professional footballer and current manager
- Luuk van Troost (born 1969) cricketer, captained the Netherlands national cricket team
- Erik Jazet (born 1971) a former field hockey player, team medallist in three Olympic Games
- Andre van Troost (born 1972) a former cricketer, a right-arm fast bowler
- Rob Cordemans (born 1974) a baseball player
- Ali Elkhattabi (born 1977) a retired Dutch-Moroccan footballer with 238 club caps
- Danny Koevermans (born 1978) a former footballer with 296 club caps, currently a coach
- Gökhan Saki (born 1983) a Dutch-Turkish kickboxer and mixed martial artist
- Jos van Emden (born 1985) a road bicycle racer and time-trial specialist
- Nick de Bruijn (born 1987) a racing driver
- Kelly Dulfer (born 1994) a handball player with the Dutch national team
- Joshua Zirkzee (born 2001) a football player

== International relations ==
=== Twin towns – Sister cities ===
Schiedam was twinned with:

- - Vienne, France
- - Esslingen am Neckar, Germany (since 1964)
- - Piotrków Trybunalski, Poland (since 1992)
- - Velenje, Slovenia (since 1970)
- - Neath Port Talbot, Wales (since 1964)
- - Udine, Italy
- - Wandsworth, England (since 1946)

The relations between Schiedam and these cities was stopped in 2008, after Schiedam joined Eurotowns

== Gallery ==
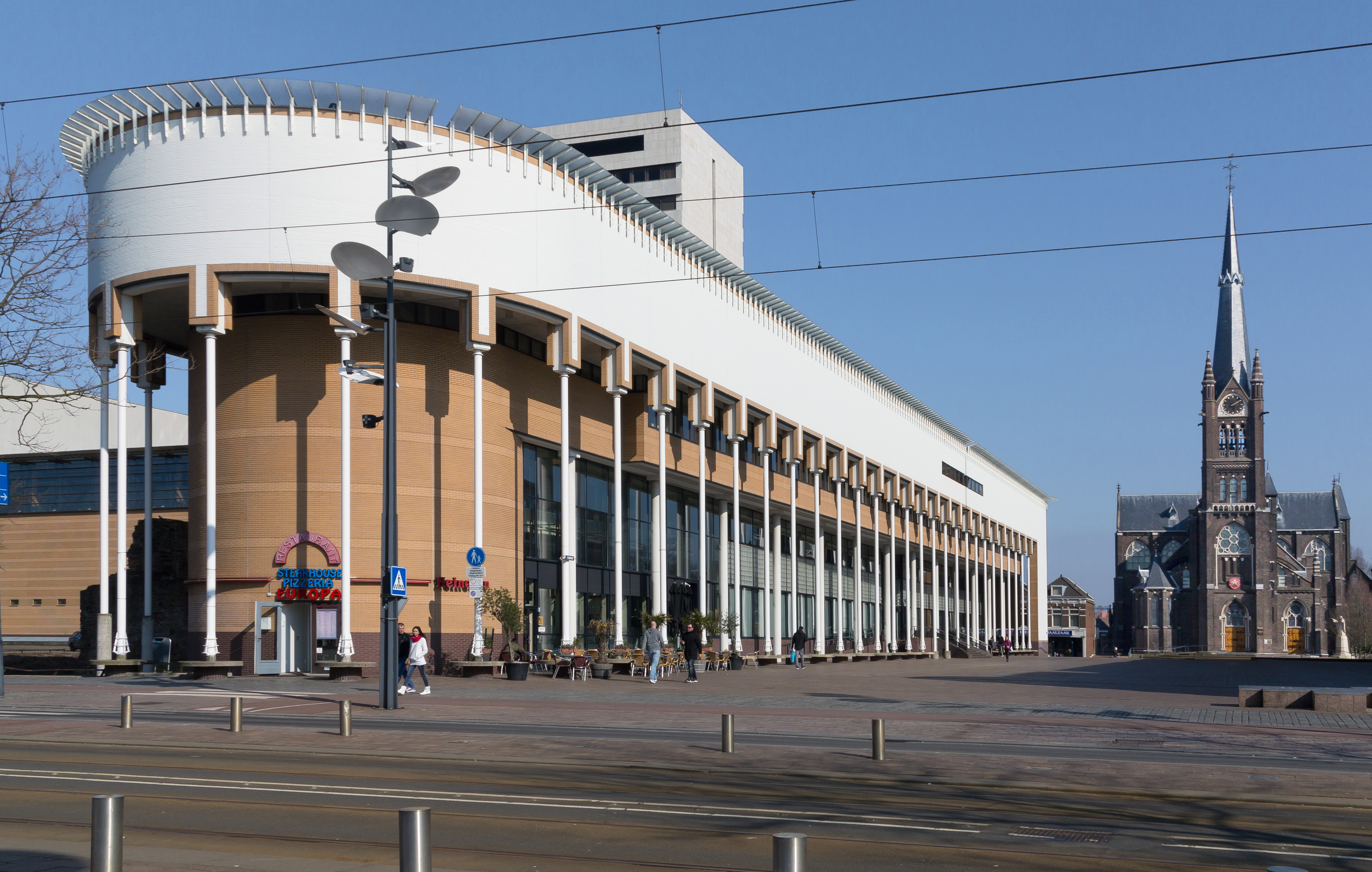
New city hall and basilica

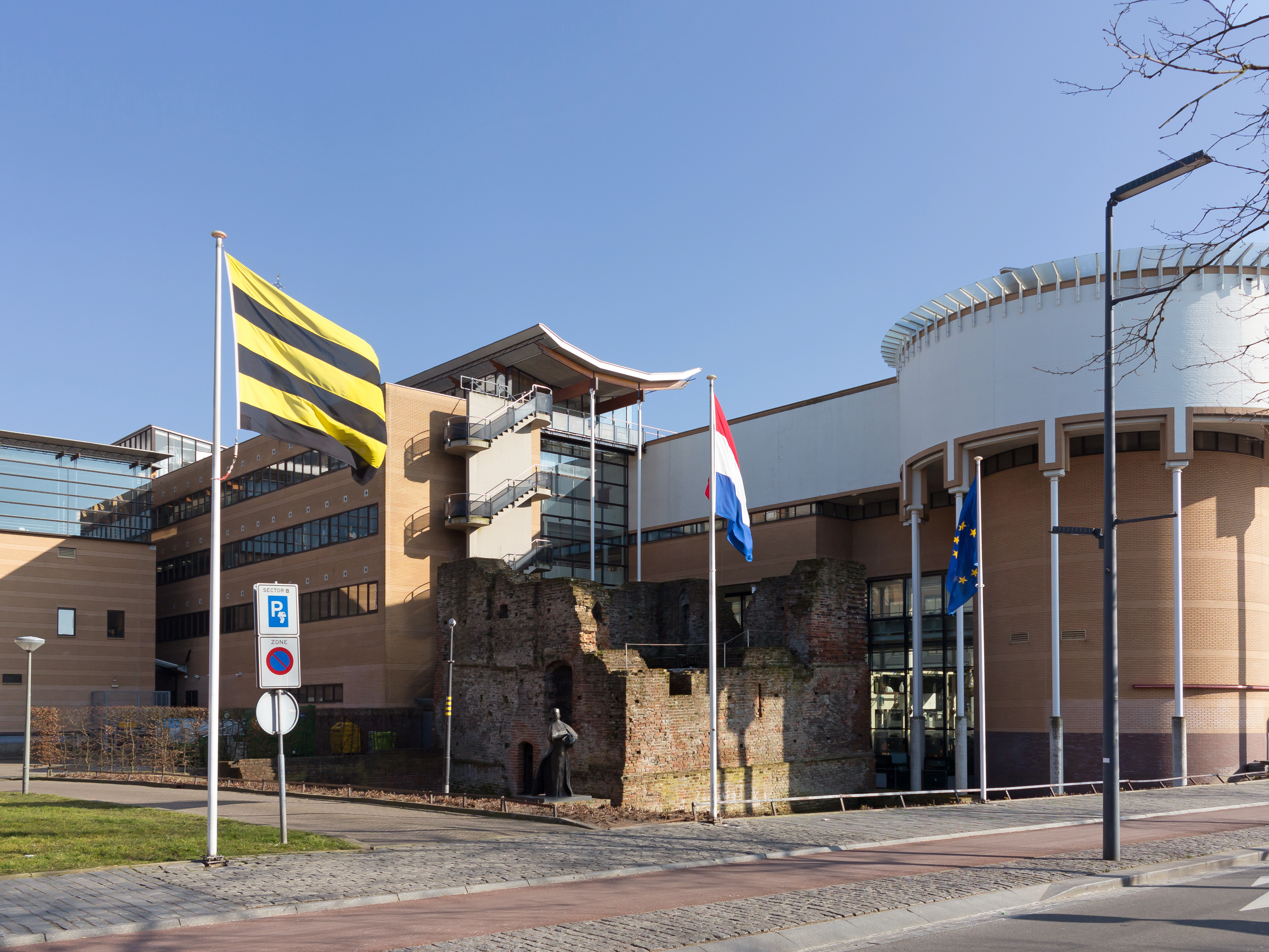
Ruin: Huis te Riviere

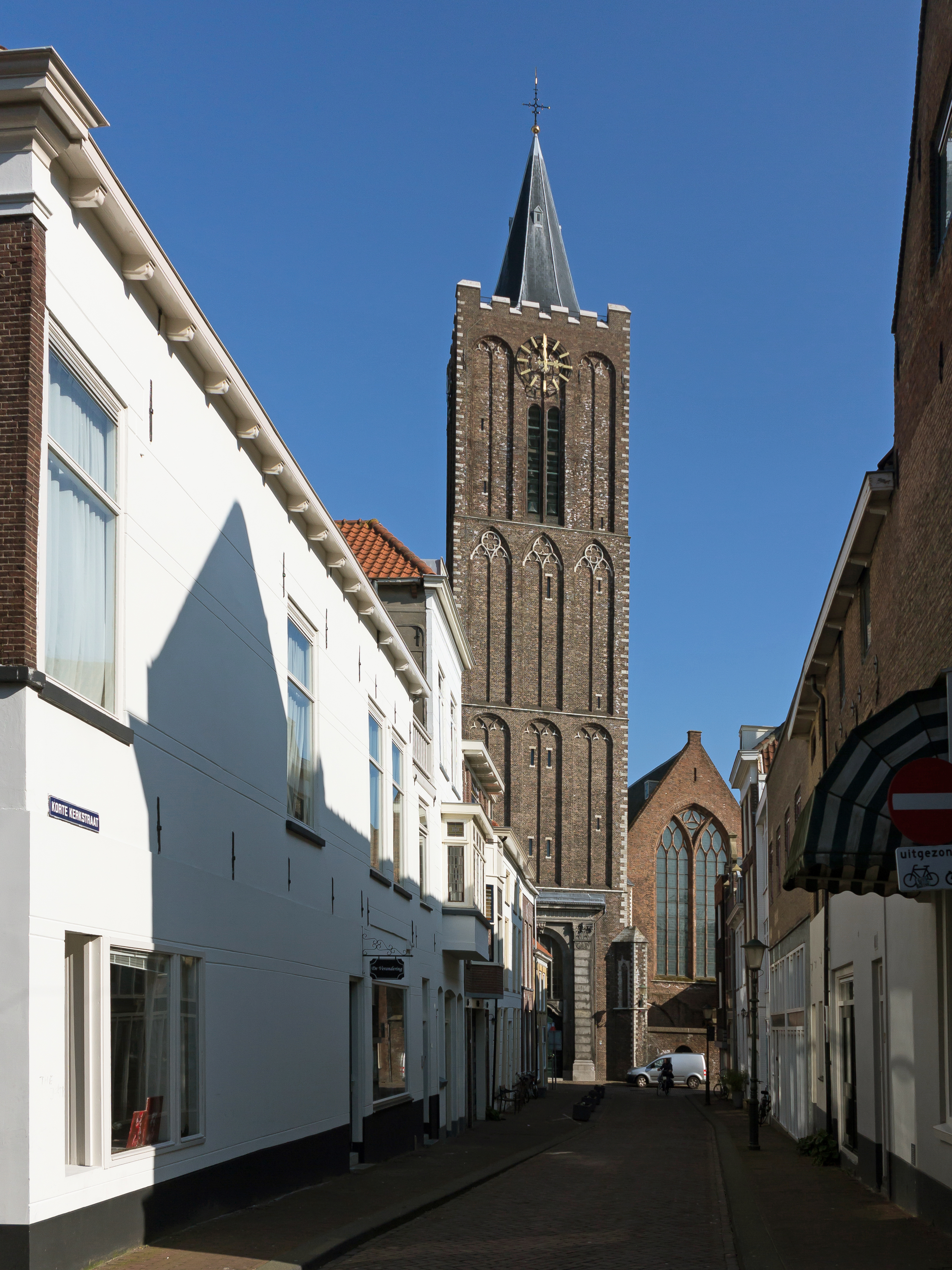
Church: de Grote of Sint Janskerk

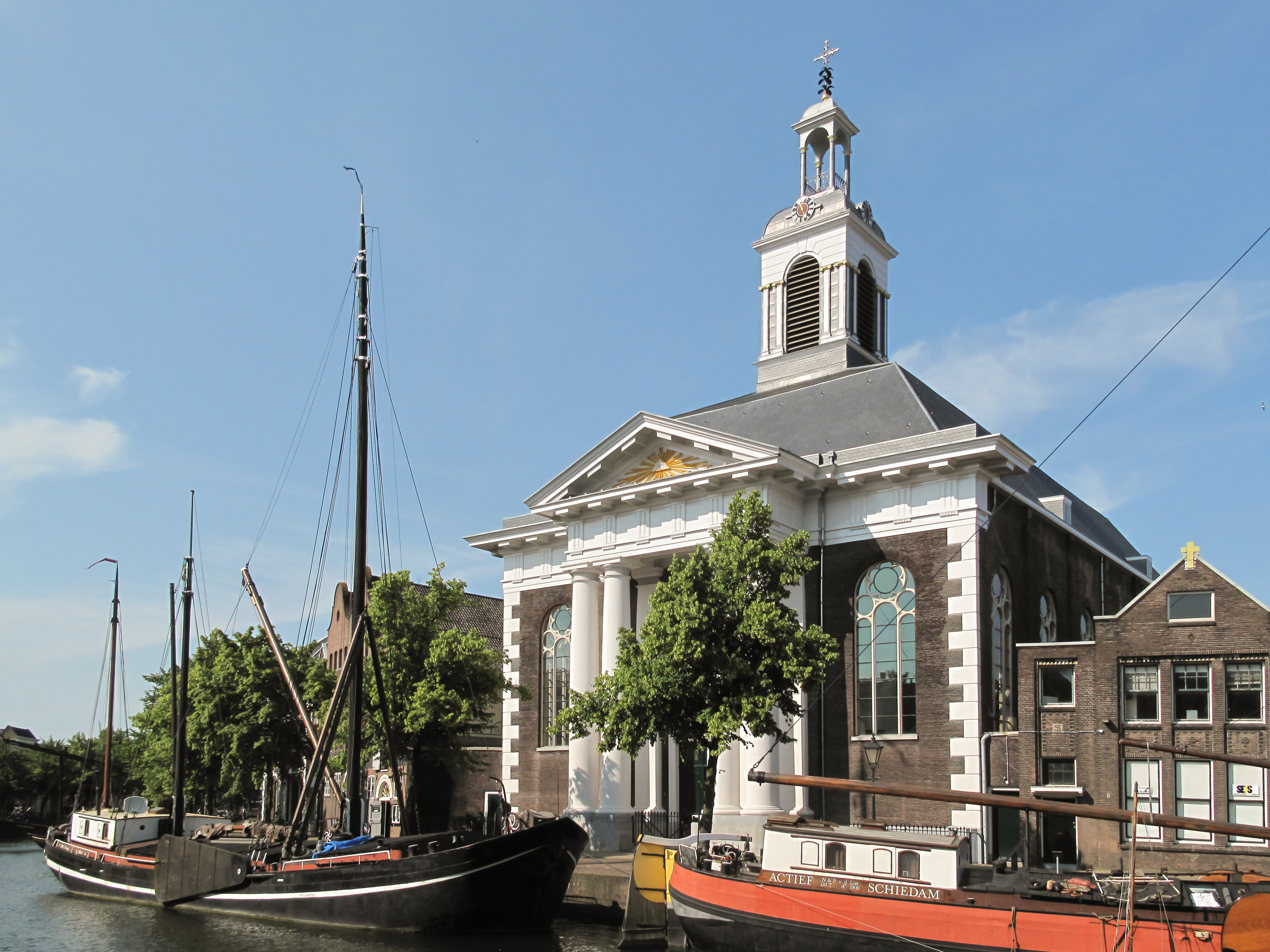
Church: Johannes de Doperkerk

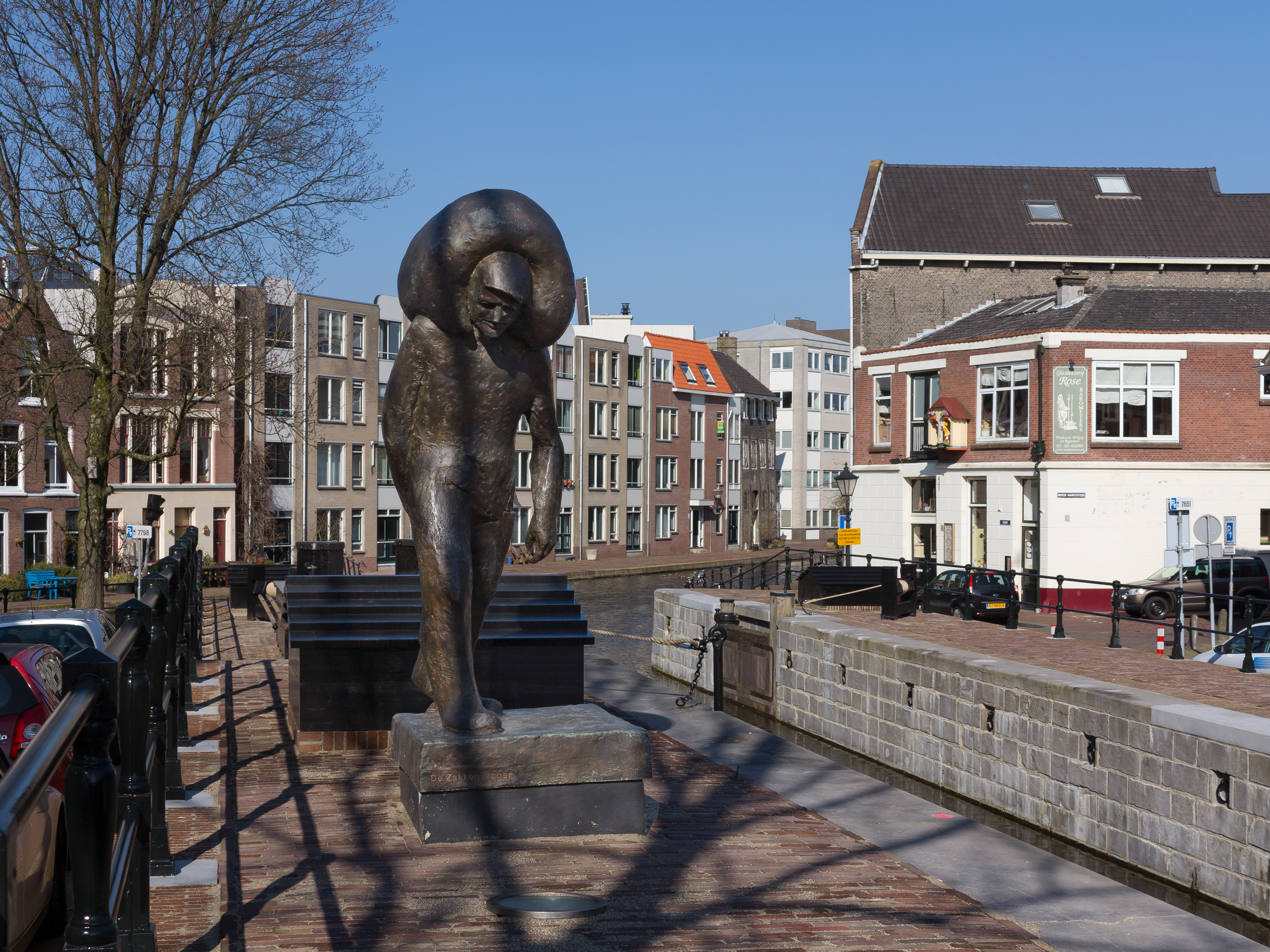
Sculpture (de Zakkendrager)

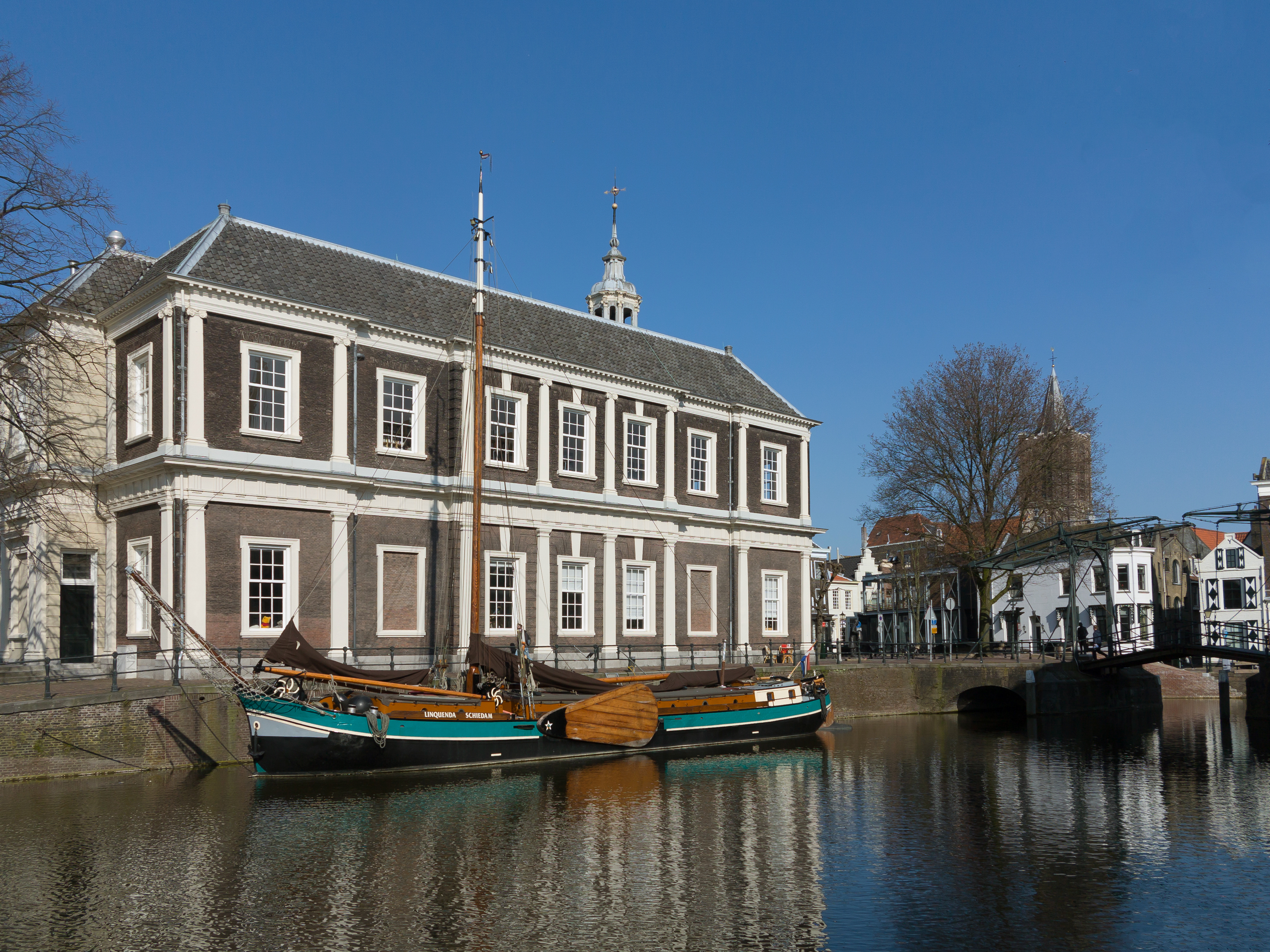
Ship in the Korte Haven near the Korenbeurs

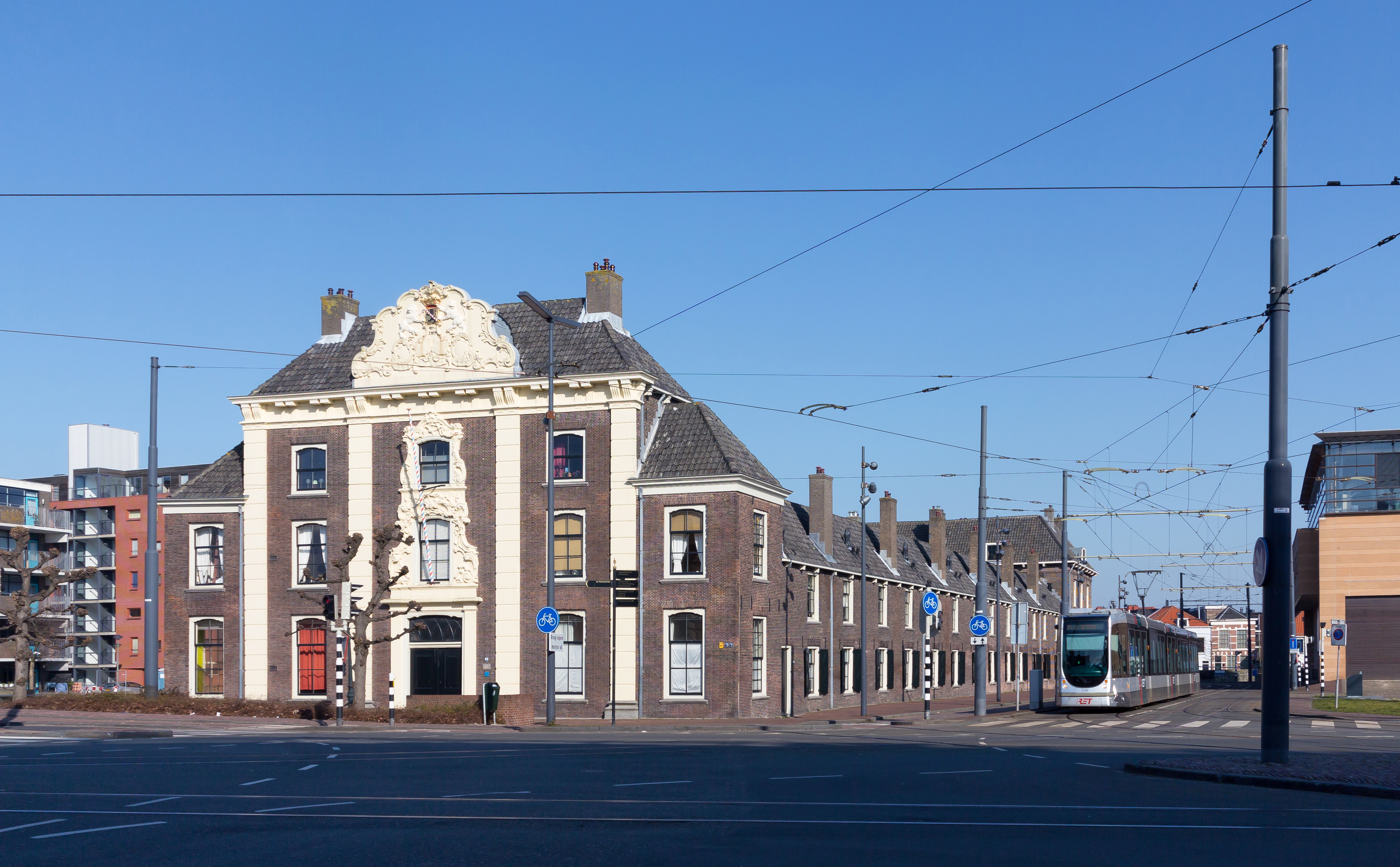
Historic building: het Proveniershuis

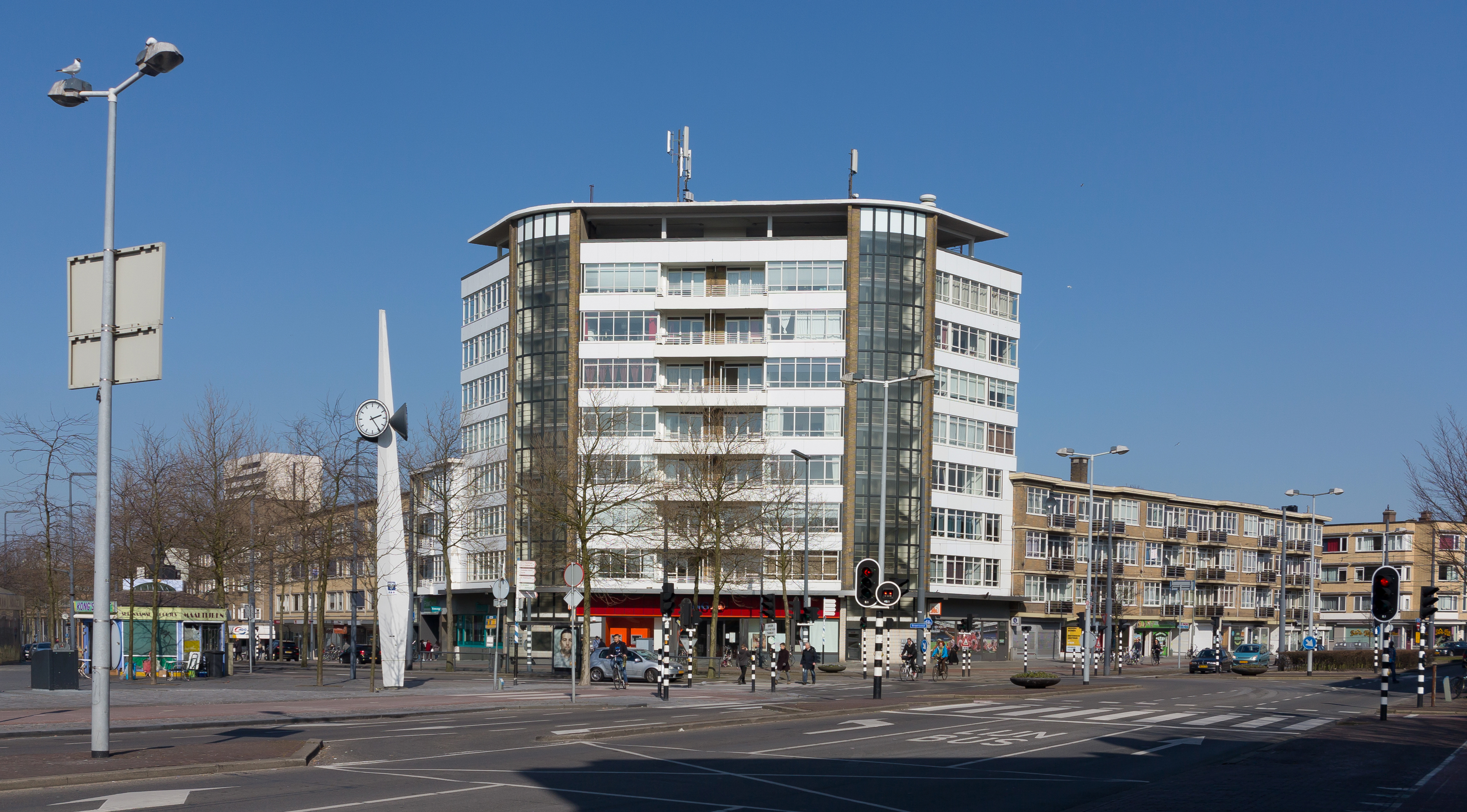
Street view: Broersvest-Rotterdamsedijk

== See also ==
- HMS Schiedam
- Nieuwland, Kortland, en 's-Graveland
- Schiedam riots
