= Roderick =

Name list

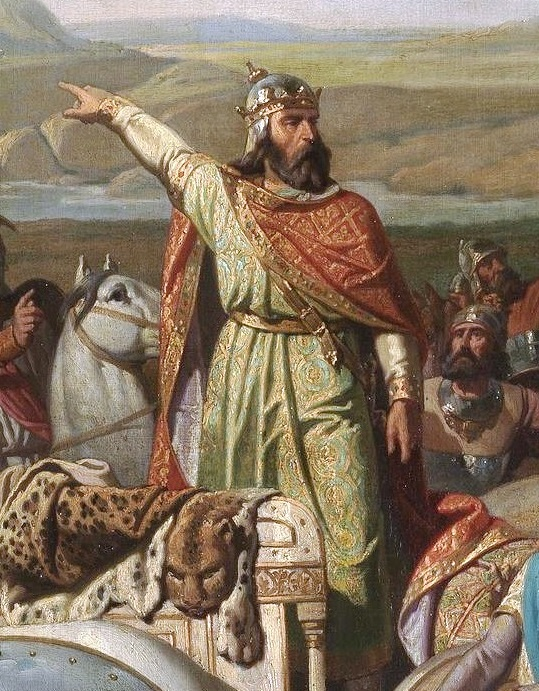
- Romantic painting of Visigothic king of Spain. Bernardo Blanco y Pérez (Museo del Prado) Roderic
- Gender: Male
- Name day: March 13

Origin
- Origin: Germanic
- Meaning: "fame/glory/great" + "reiks, king, ruler, leader"
- Region of origin: Northern Europe; Visigothic Kingdom

Other names
- Variant forms: Hrœrekr, Hrærekur, Rœrekr, Rorich, Rorik, Rurik, Rúrik, Rurich, Roddy, Rodrick, Roderic, Roderich, Rodric, Ruodrich, Chrodericus, Hrodericus, Rodericus, Ludhriq, Rodrigo, Rhoderick

Roderick, Rodrick or Roderic (Proto-Germanic *Hrōþirīks, from *hrōþiz, lit. 'fame, glory' + *ríks, 'king, ruler') is a Germanic name, recorded from the 8th century onward. Its Old High German forms are Hrodric, Chrodericus, Hroderich, Roderich, Ruodrich, etc.; in Gothic language Hrōþireiks; in Old English language it appears as Hrēðrīc or Hroðrīc, and in Old Norse as Hrǿríkʀ (Old East Norse Hrø̄rīkʀ, Rø̄rīkʀ, Old West Norse as Hrœrekr, Rœrekr).

In the 12th-century Primary Chronicle, the name is reflected as Рюрикъ, i.e. Rurik. In Spanish and Portuguese, it was rendered as Rodrigo, or in its short form, Ruy or Rui, and in Galician, the name is Roy or Roi. In Arabic, the form Ludharīq (لُذَرِيق), used to refer Roderic (Ulfilan Gothic: *Hroþareiks), the last king of the Visigoths. Saint Roderick (d. 857) is one of the Martyrs of Córdoba.

The modern English name does not continue the Anglo-Saxon form but was re-introduced from the continent by the Normans in medieval England. The Middle English given name had also virtually disappeared by the 19th century, even though it had survived as a surname. The given name was re-popularised by Sir Walter Scott's poem The Vision of Don Roderick (1811), where Roderick refers to the Visigothic king. The modern English name is sometimes abbreviated to Roddy.

Roderick is also an Anglicisation of several unrelated names. As a surname and given name it is used as an anglicised form of the Welsh Rhydderch. The given name Roderick is also used as an anglicised form of the Gaelic personal name Rory (Irish: Ruaidhrí, Ruairí; Scottish Gaelic: Ruairidh, Ruaraidh).

== Medieval period ==
- Hreðric, king Hroðgar's son in Beowulf, who has various counterparts named Rørik and Hrœrekr in Norse mythology
- Hrœrekr Ringslinger (Rørik Slængeborræ or Rørik Slyngebond), mythological king in what is today Denmark. Father of Queen Gertrude, the prototype of Shakespeare's Prince Hamlet, possibly mixed up with the Viking prince of Novgorod, Rurik; or the same person.
- Roderic, 8th-century king of the Visigoths in Visigothic Kingdom of Spain.
- Rorik of Dorestad, chieftain who ruled Frisia, in the 9th century
- Rurik, 9th-century prince of Novgorod, known as Hrøríkr of Holmgard, in Norse literature, Varangian viking King.
- Saint Roderick (d. 857), one of the Martyrs of Córdoba.
- Rodrigo Díaz de Vivar (c. 1043–1099), better known as El Cid, or simply Rodrigo, was a Castilian nobleman and military leader in medieval Spain.
- Rorich von Scheidt genannt Weschpfennig (1515–1565), German nobleman who was Lord of Scheidt, Bröl, Lohmar, among various estates, and served as Landjaegermeister for the Blankenberg office. He was the father of Wilhelm von Scheidt.
- S Uciredor ("Rodericus" spelled backwards), Medieval composer

== Modern given name ==
See also:

- Roderick Anderson (born 1972), American basketball player
- Roderick Beaton, British Hellenist
- Roderick "Rory" Bremner (b. 1961), British impressionist
- Roderick Bowe, Bahamian military officer and the 6th commodore of the Royal Bahamas Defence Force
- Roderic "Rod" Brind'Amour (born 1970), Canadian ice hockey player
- Roderick Chadwick (born 1978), England classical pianist
- Roderick Chisholm (1916–1999), American philosopher
- Roderick Coyne (born 1945), English artist, sculptor
- Roderick Firth (1917–1987), Professor of Philosophy at Harvard University
- Roderick "Roddy" Frame (born 1964), Scottish singer, songwriter and musician
- Roderic Hill (1894-1954), senior Royal Air Force commander, one of the principal commanders of Operation Steinbock and 1936–1939 Arab revolt in Palestine
- Roderick Hunt, British children's author
- Roderick Johnson (born 1995), American football player
- Roderick Lewis (born 1971), American football player
- Roderick MacKinnon (born 1956), professor of Molecular Neurobiology and Biophysics at Rockefeller University
- Roderick Miranda (born 1991), Portuguese footballer
- Roderick Murchison (1792–1871), Scottish geologist who first described and investigated the Silurian system
- Roderick R. Allen (1894–1970), Major General in the United States Army
- Roderick R. Butler (1827-1902), American politician
- Roddy Ricch (born 1998), real name Roderick Wayne Moore Jr., American rapper
- Roderick Robinson II (born 2004), American football player
- Roderick "Rod" Stewart (born 1945), English singer/songwriter
- Roderick Strong (born 1983), American professional wrestler
- Roderick Toombs or Roddy Piper (1954–2015), Canadian retired professional wrestler and film actor
- Roderick Watson (born 1943), Scottish poet, born in Aberdeen
- Roderick Williams (born 1965), English operatic baritone
- Rodric Williams, British solicitor

=== Fictional characters ===
- Roderick Alleyn, a fictional detective created by Ngaio Marsh.
- Rodrick Heffley, a fictional character in the children's book series Diary of a Wimpy Kid.
- Roderick Kingsey, also known as Hobgoblin a supervillain in Marvel Comics
- Roderick Random, protagonist of the 1748 novel The Adventures of Roderick Random, by Tobias Smollett
- Roderick Spode, recurring fictional character from the Jeeves novels of British comic writer P. G. Wodehouse
- Roderick Usher, from Edgar Allan Poe's short story The Fall of the House of Usher.
- Roderich Edelstein, also known as Austria from the 2009 anime Hetalia

== Modern surname ==
See also Rodriguez and Rodrigues.

- Aaron Roderick (born 1972), offensive coordinator and quarterbacks coach for the Brigham Young University Cougars football team
- Brande Roderick (born 1974), American model and actress
- Buckley Roderick (1862–1908), Welsh solicitor, international rugby union forward and a Vice-Consular for Spain
- Caerwyn Roderick (1927–2011), British Labour Party politician
- Casey Roderick (born 1992), American stock car racing driver
- David Roderick (born 1970), award-winning American poet, Assistant Professor at the University of North Carolina at Greensboro
- George H. Roderick (1880–1963), official in the United States Department of the Army during the Eisenhower Administration
- Gerald Roderick (1924-1998), American politician from Missouri
- Jane Roderick, British slalom canoeist who competed in the early 1980s
- John Roderick (American football) (born 1944), former professional American football wide receiver
- John Roderick (correspondent) (1914–2008), American journalist, foreign correspondent for the Associated Press news service
- John Roderick (musician) (born 1968), American musician and writer
- Judy Roderick (1942–1992), American blues singer and songwriter
- Libby Roderick (born 1958), American singer/songwriter, recording artist, poet, activist, and teacher
- Matt Von Roderick (born 1974), American trumpeter, singer and recording artist
- Myron Roderick (1934–2011), American wrestler
- Philip Roderick, British Anglican priest, founder of the Quiet Garden Movement
- Richard Roderick (died 1756), British editor and poet
- Rick Roderick (1949–2002), American professor of philosophy

== Other ==
- Roderick, favorite horse of Nathan Bedford Forrest, Confederate general in the American Civil War
- Kenneth Roderick O'Neal (1908–1989), African-American architect
- Spencer Buford House, historic house listed on the NRHP in Williamson County, Tennessee, known also as Roderick for Nathan Bedford Forrest's horse
- Roderick (novel), 1980 science fiction novel by John Sladek
- 16194 Roderick (2000 AJ231), main-belt asteroid

== See also ==
- Roderic
- Rodrick (disambiguation)
- Rodrigo
- Rodríguez (surname)
- Rurik
- Broderick
- Germanic names
