= HMBS Lignum Vitae =

HMBS Lignum Vitae (P 301) is the first of four Damen Stan 3007 patrol vessels commissioned by the Royal Bahamas Defence Force. She was projected to be ready for delivery to the Bahamas in June 2015.

== Design ==
Lignum Vitae, and her sister ships are 30 metres (98 ft) long and 7 metres (23 ft) wide, and have a maximum speed of 24 knots (44 km/h). She and her sister ships have a shallow draft, for inshore work. She is designed for missions of up to five days. She is designed for a crew of 13.

While most modern vessels are designed with a clipper bow, Damen built Lignum Vitae, and her sister ships, with an "axe bow", a new style of bow intended to make for easier sea-keeping in rough weather. At her stern she is equipped with a stern launching ramp, which enables her to deploy and retrieve her waterjet-propelled pursuit boat, without first coming to a stop.

== Operational history ==
On May 16, 2016, Lignum Vitae apprehended a Dominican Republic fishing vessel, poaching fish in the Bahamas' territorial waters. The 60-foot (18 m) long vessel had a crew of 11. They were taken into custody.

On July 30, 2016, Lignum Vitae helped convey 199 Haitian refugees discovered by another Bahamanian patrol vessel, P 129, to New Providence. On July 30, 2016, Lignum Vitae intercepted a small boat with eight Cuban refugees aboard.
