= Rorik =

Rorik is a masculine given name related to Roderick. It may refer to:

- Rorik of Dorestad (c. 810–c. 880), Danish Viking who ruled parts of Friesland
- Rorik I, 9th century Danish Viking chieftain
- Hrœrekr Ringslinger (Old Danish: Rørik Slængeborræ or Rørik Slyngebond), a legendary king of Zealand or Denmark

== See also ==
- Rurik (disambiguation)
