= HMBS Cascarilla =

HBMS Cascarilla (P 302) is the second of four Damen Stan 3007 patrol vessels commissioned by the Royal Bahamas Defence Force.

== Design ==
The Cascarilla, and her sister ships are 30 metres (98 ft) long and 7 metres (23 ft) wide, and have a maximum speed of 24 knots (44 km/h). She and her sister ships have a shallow draft, for inshore work. She is designed for missions of up to five days. She is designed for a crew of 13.

While most modern vessels are designed with a clipper bow, Damen built the Cascarilla, and her sister ships, with an "axe bow", a new style of bow intended to make for easier sea-keeping in rough weather. At her stern she is equipped with a stern launching ramp, which enables her to deploy and retrieve her waterjet-propelled pursuit boat, without first coming to a stop.

== Operational history ==
In early 2016 the Cascarilla was damaged in a grounding. Repairs cost $23,000.

On June 15, 2016, the Cascarilla exchanged gunfire with individuals they believed were Dominican Republic fish poachers. No crew members were injured, but the poachers got away.

On January 2, 2018, the Cascarilla intercepted a 40 foot sailing sloop carrying 91 undocumented migrants.

On March 27, 2018, an undocumented Haitian immigrant triggered a search when he was able to phone Bahamanian officials and report the smuggling vessel he was on had sprung a leak. The Royal Bahamas Defence Force requested the United States Coast Guard to dispatch aircraft to help locate the vessel. After the USCG located the vessel, the Cascarilla intercepted a smuggling sloop and rescued 89 undocumented migrants from Haiti.
