= Havenhoofd =

- Village
- Location in the province of South Holland in the Netherlands Location in the Netherlands
- Coordinates: 51.8302°N 4.0065°E
- Country: Netherlands
- Province: South Holland
- Municipality: Goeree-Overflakkee

Area
  - Total: 0.10 km^{2} (0.039 sq mi)
- Elevation: 1.9 m (6.2 ft)

Population (2021)
  - Total: 295
  - Density: 3,000/km^{2} (7,600/sq mi)
- Time zone: UTC+1 (CET)
  - Summer (DST): UTC+2 (CEST)
- Postal code: 3252
- Dialing code: 0187

Havenhoofd is a village in the Dutch province of South Holland. It is part of the municipality of Goeree-Overflakkee and lies about 10 km west of Hellevoetsluis.

The village was first mentioned around 1750 as "'t Goereese Hooft" and refers to the dams on either side of the harbour. During the 18th century, Havenhoofd developed as a harbour village for Goedereede.

In 1943, during World War II, the entire village was demolished as part of the Atlantic Wall, and 42 bunkers were built in the area. Some of the bunkers are still hidden under the sand of the dunes. Havenhoofd was rebuilt between 1947 and 1949. In 1958, the harbour was dammed as a result of the North Sea flood of 1953, and the fishermen moved to Stellendam.

== Gallery ==
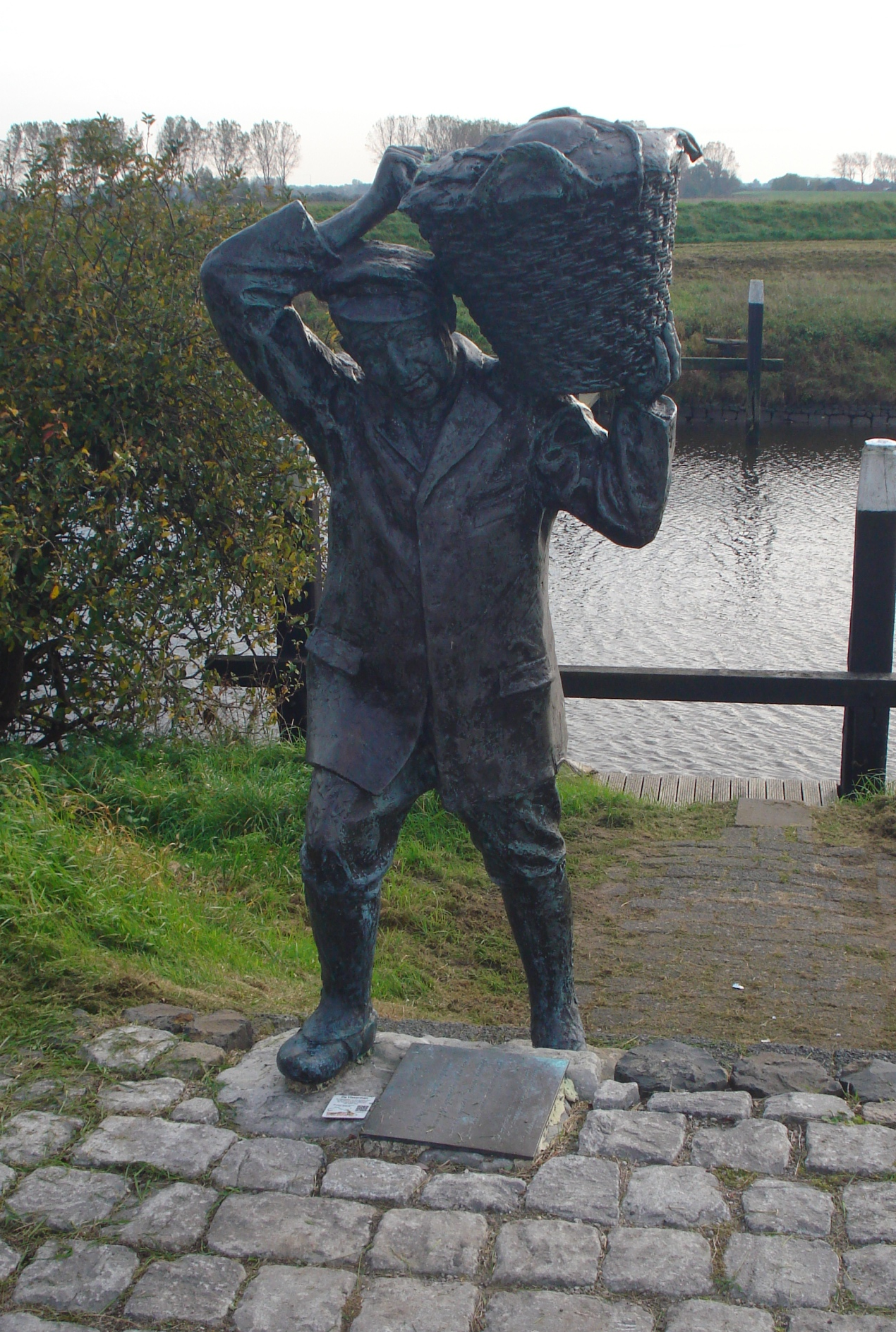
Fisherman statue
