= Commander of the Defence Force (The Bahamas) =

Professional head of the Royal Bahamas Defence Force

Commander Defence Force of Bahamas
- Emblem of the Bahamas Defence Force
- Incumbent; Floyd Moxey since 8 May 2025
- Royal Bahamas Defence Force
- Formation: October 1976; 50 years ago
- First holder: William Swinley
- Deputy: Deputy Commander Defence Force
- Website: Official website

The Commander of the Defence Force is the professional head of the Royal Bahamas Defence Force. He is responsible for the administration and the operational control of the Defence Force. The current commander is Floyd Moxey who was appointed on 8 May 2025.

== List of commanders ==
- Acting

No.	Portrait	Name (Birth–Death)	Term of office			Ref.
No.	Portrait	Name (Birth–Death)	Took office	Left office	Time in office	Ref.
1		Commodore; William Swinley (?–2014)	October 1976	1981	4–5 years	
2		Commodore; Christopher Belton; Royal Navy	1981	1983	1–2 years	
3		Commodore; Leon L. Smith	1983	1997	13–14 years	
4		Commodore; Davy Rolle	1997	2006	8–9 years	
5		Commodore; Clifford Scavella	1 November 2006	21 January 2010	3 years, 81 days	
6		Commodore; Roderick Bowe (born 1961)	21 January 2010	15 March 2015	5 years, 53 days	
–		Commodore; Tellis Bethel	15 March 2015	1 May 2017	2 years, 47 days	
7		Commodore; Tellis Bethel	1 May 2017	16 October 2019	2 years, 168 days	
–		Commodore; Raymond King (born 1968)	16 October 2019	21 May 2020	218 days	
8		Commodore; Raymond King (born 1968)	21 May 2020	Incumbent	6 years, 161 days	
