= Roddey =

Roddey is a surname. Notable people with the surname include:

- Jim Roddey (1933–2024), American businessman and politician
- Phillip Roddey (1826–1897), American Civil War brigadier general

== See also ==
- Rodney (name)
- Roddy
