= Rod (given name) =

Rod is a common diminutive (hypocorism) of various masculine given names, including Rodney, Roderick, Rodford and Rodion.

It may refer to:

- Rod Allen (born 1959), American baseball player and commentator
- Rod Allen (advertising executive) (1929–2007), nicknamed the "jingle king"
- Rod Argent (born 1945), English singer and keyboardist
- Rod Bernard (1940–2020), American singer
- Rod Blagojevich (born 1956), American politician
- Rod Bonella (1937–2000), Australian long-distance runner and horse trainer
- Rod Brind'Amour (born 1970), Canadian ice hockey player
- Rod Brown (basketball) (born 1978), American basketball player
- Rod Brown (gridiron football) (born 1963), American former football player
- Rod Caddies, Australian politician
- Rod Cameron (actor) (1910–1983), Canadian film and television actor born Nathan Roderick Cox
- Rod Cameron (footballer) (born 1939), English former footballer
- Rod Carew (born 1945) Panamanian-American former professional baseball player and coach
- Rod Daniel (1942–2016), American film director
- Rod Davies (1930–2015), British astronomer
- Rod Davis (gridiron football) (born 1981), American National Football League and Canadian Football League linebacker
- Rod Davis (sailor) (born 1955), American-born Olympic sailor who competed for the United States and New Zealand
- Rod Davis (Quarrymen), member of the British skiffle and rock 'n' roll group The Quarrymen
- Rod Dyachenko (born 1983), Russian association football player
- Rod Fergusson (born 1968), Canadian video game producer
- Rod Foster (born 1960), American basketball player
- Rod Gilbert (1941–2021), Canadian-American ice hockey player
- Rod Hardy, Australian television and film director
- Rod Hay (born 1947), English-born filmmaker
- Rod Heard II, American football player
- Rod Johnson (footballer) (1945–2019), English retired football player
- Rod Johnson (programmer), founder of the Spring Framework, an open source application framework for Java
- Rod Jones (disambiguation), multiple people
- Rod Macqueen (born 1949), Australian former rugby union coach
- Rod Mandelstam (born 1942), South African tennis player
- Rod Manuel (born 1974), American football player
- Rod McKuen (1933–2015), American singer-songwriter, composer and poet
- Rod Michalko, Canadian scholar in disability studies
- Rod Phillips (1960–1993), American actor, jeweler and model
- Rod Robinson (born 1976), American football player
- Rod Roddenberry (born 1974), American television producer and writer
- Rod Roddy (1937–2003), American radio and television announcer
- Rod Serling (1924–1975), American screenwriter, playwright, television producer, host and narrator
- Rod Smallwood (disambiguation), multiple people
- Rod Smith (disambiguation), multiple people
- Rod Steiger (1925–2002), American actor
- Rod Stewart (born 1945), British rock musician
- Rod Thorn (born 1941), American basketball player, coach, and executive
- Rod Tolbert (born 1967), American former sprinter
- Rod Wave (born 1999), American rapper

== See also ==
- Roddy
