= Roddie =

Roddie is a masculine given name, often a short form of Roderick, and a surname. It may refer to:

- Roderick Roddie Edmonds (1919–1985), World War II American master sergeant who protected Jewish-American prisoners of war from their German captors
- Roddie Haley (1964–2022), American sprinter
- Roderick Roddie MacDonald (born 1954), Scottish footballer
- Roderick Roddie MacKenzie (1901–?), Scottish footballer
- Roderick Roddie Munro (1920–1976), Scottish footballer
- Andy Roddie (born 1971), Scottish footballer

== See also ==
- Roddy, a given name and surname
