= P61 =

P61 or P-61 may refer to:

== Vessels ==
- HMBS Nassau (P-61), a patrol boat of the Royal Bahamas Defence Force
- HMS Varangian (P61), a submarine of the Royal Navy
- INS Kora (P61), a corvette of the Indian Navy
- LÉ Samuel Beckett (P61), an offshore patrol vessel of the Irish Naval Service
- Maltese patrol boat P61
- Polemistis (P61), a HSY-55-class gunboat of the Hellenic Navy

== Other uses ==
- Northrop P-61 Black Widow, an American night fighter aircraft
- BRM P61, a Formula One racing car
- P61 road (Ukraine)
- Papyrus 61, a biblical manuscript
- P61, a state regional road in Latvia
- Sea Tiger (P61), a fictional submarine in the film We Dive at Dawn
- P6_{1}, three-dimensional space group number 169
