= Toren van Goedereede =

Coordinates: 51.818443°N 3.975656°E

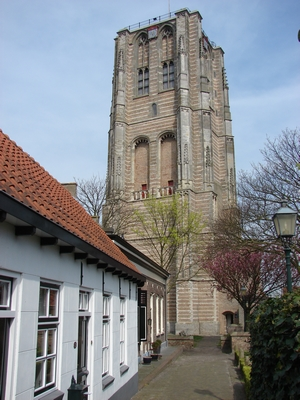
The tower in 2007

The Toren van Goedereede (Dutch pronunciation: [ˈtoːrə(ɱ) vɑŋ ˌɣudəˈreːdə]; (Note: In isolation, Toren and van are pronounced [ˈtoːrə(n)] and [vɑn], respectively.) Goederede Tower) is a gray square brick tower in Goedereede, Netherlands, 39.5 metres (130 ft) high, belonging to the Catharina church. It was built in 1512. From 1552 to 1912 the tower served as a lighthouse, and went through various changes during this period. Today it has been restored and is a museum, housing a carillon.

== Church tower ==
The original tower was part of a large parish church in the then-prosperous fishing and trading port. Adriaan Florenszoon Boeyens (1459–1523), the future Pope Adrian VI, was pastor of the church. During a great fire in Goedereede in 1482 the old "Katharina Church" and its tower were destroyed. A new church was erected in 1512 beside a giant new tower, which still stands today. A large bell that sounded the hours was cast in 1519, with the Latin inscription, Est mea vox grata, quia sum Maria vocata et Georgius Waghevens Me fecit Anno Domini MCCCCCXVIII (My voice is welcome, because I am called Maria and George Waghevens made Me in the year of our Lord 1518.) A second bell was added in 1647. (Note: These bells remained in the tower until World War II. In April 1943 the Maria bell was removed and placed on a ship for Germany, to be melted down and used for war material. The crew deliberately sank the ship to preserve the bell. After the war it was recovered, cleaned and replaced in the tower.)

== Lighthouse ==
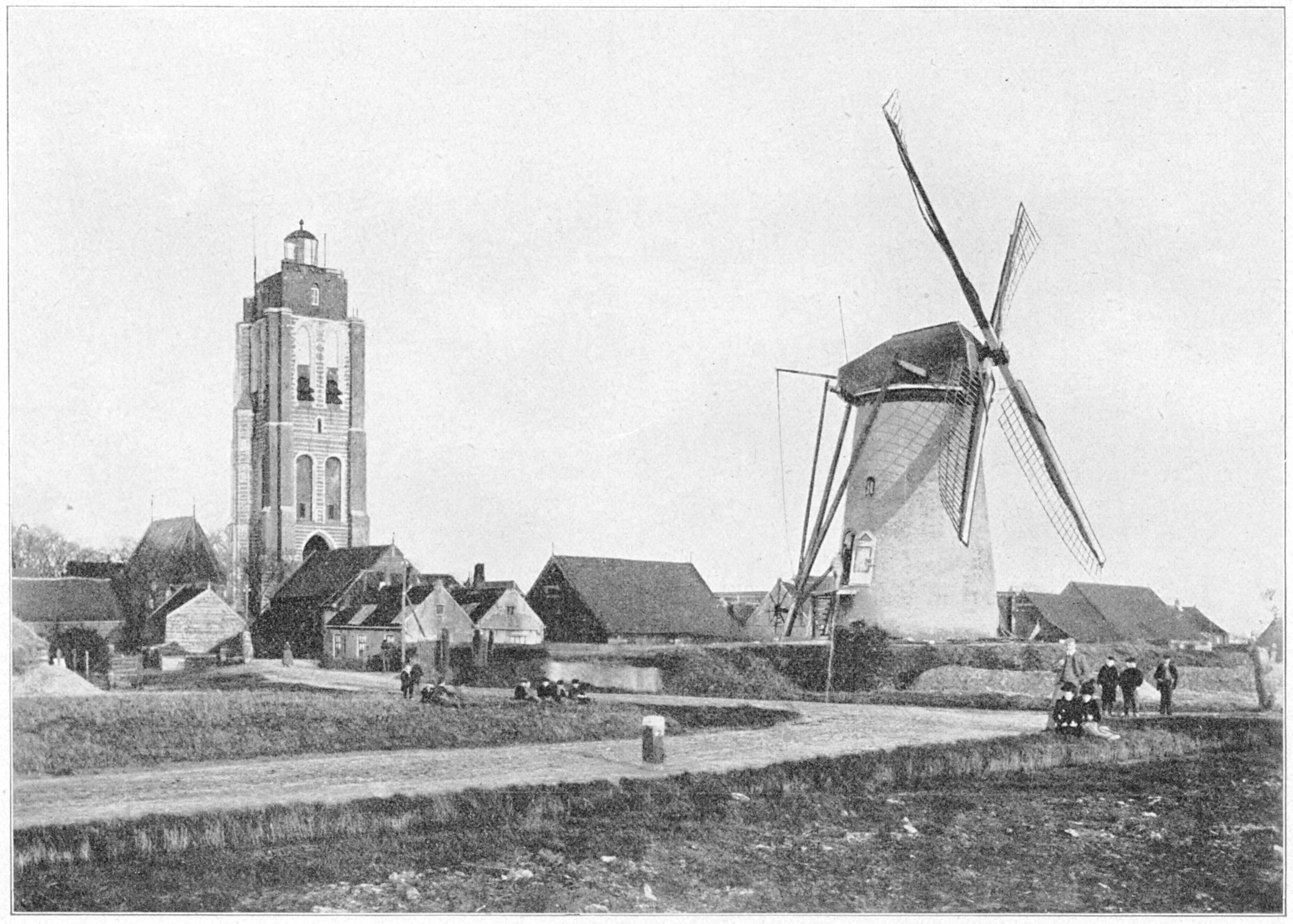
The tower and the windmill in 1910

Although at first unlit, the tower served as a landmark to help ships navigate. From 1552 the tower served as a lighthouse. The light originally came from an open coal fire.

Goederede went into a long decline, losing trade to better-sited ports. There were insufficient funds to maintain the church. In 1706 the dilapidated building was pulled down, but the tower was preserved. In 1823, the spire of the church was removed to improve use of the tower as a lighthouse. On 26 February 1834 a 45 metres (148 ft) high light with optics was installed. The optics were replaced in 1879. In 1908 the tower was equipped with rotating optics with a light intensity of 180,000 candlepower. In 1912 the lighthouse was extinguished when the West Head Lighthouse in Ouddorp came into use.

== Museum ==
In 1967 the tower was designated a national monument (Rijksmonument). From 1973 to 1978 the tower was restored at a cost of over two million euros, and made into a museum. A carillon of bells were hung in the tower, which can be played either mechanically or by hand. The carillon of 37 bells was inaugurated on 24 June 1978. In 1999 it was extended with six bass and seven treble bells. Two more bells were added in 2010, providing many more options to the player. In April 2011 the Dutch Carillon Society organized an international competition for carilloneurs, each of whom had twelve minutes to perform.

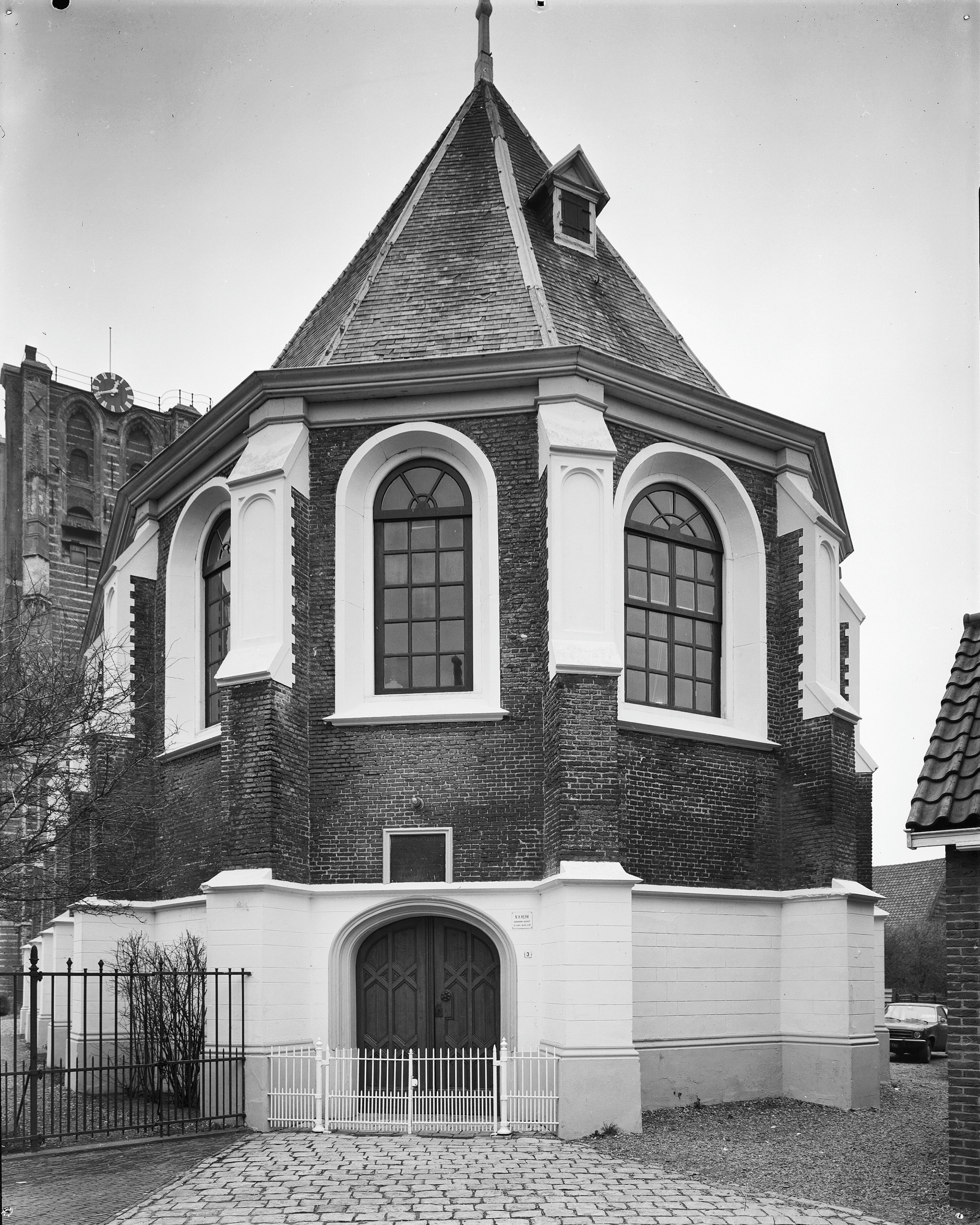
Exterior, RCE 1973

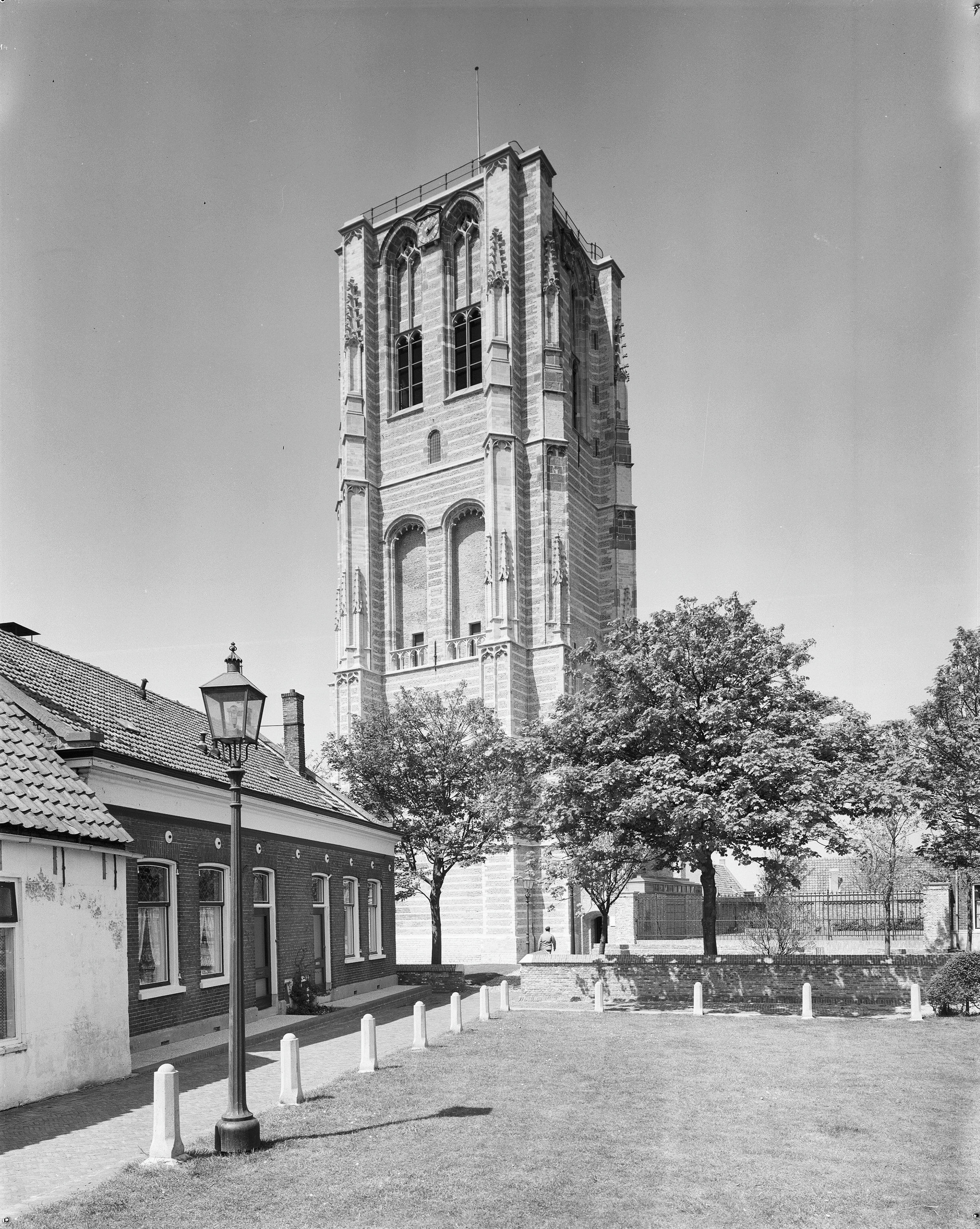
South-east side, RCE 1980

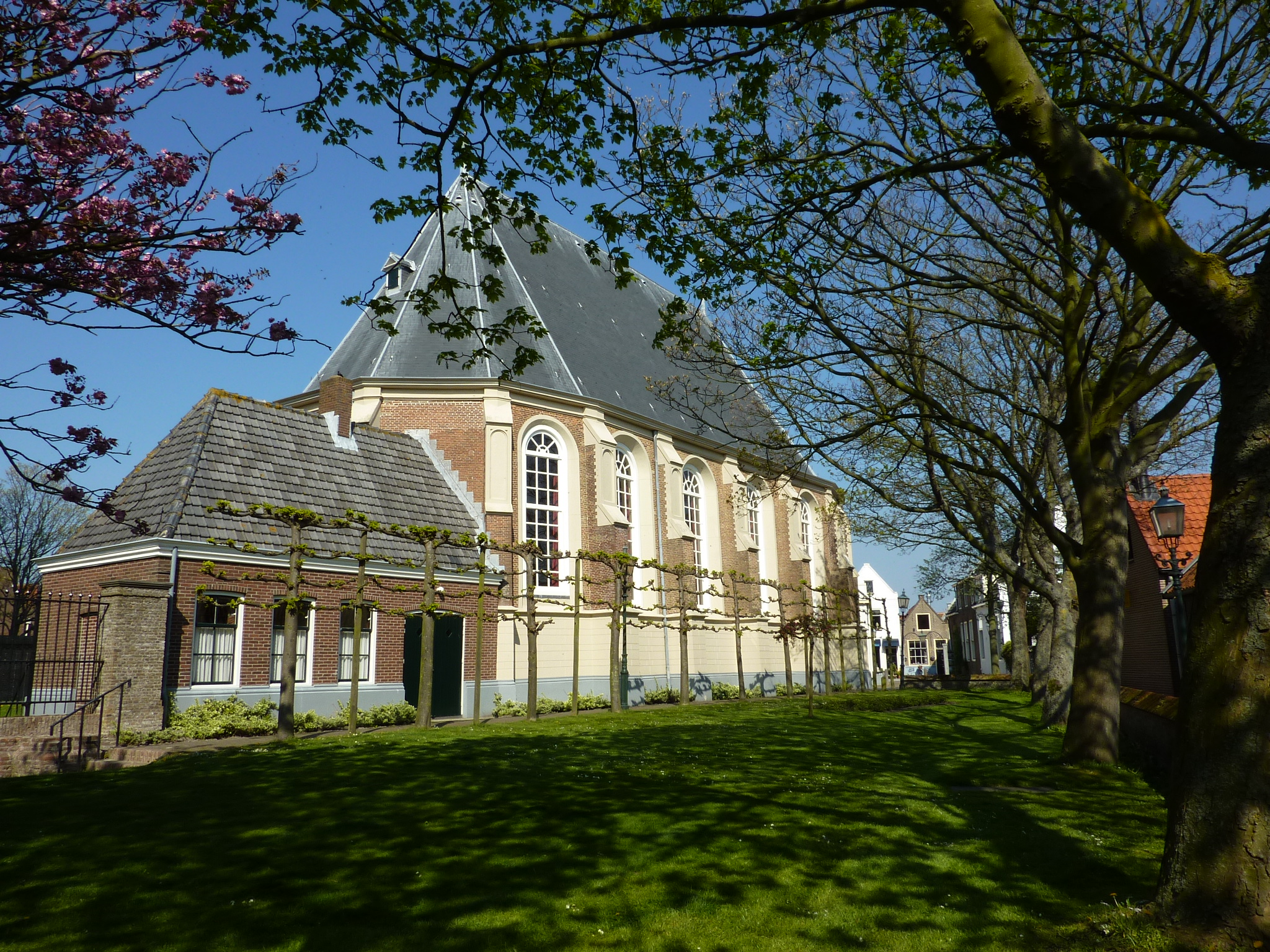
Catharina church, 2011

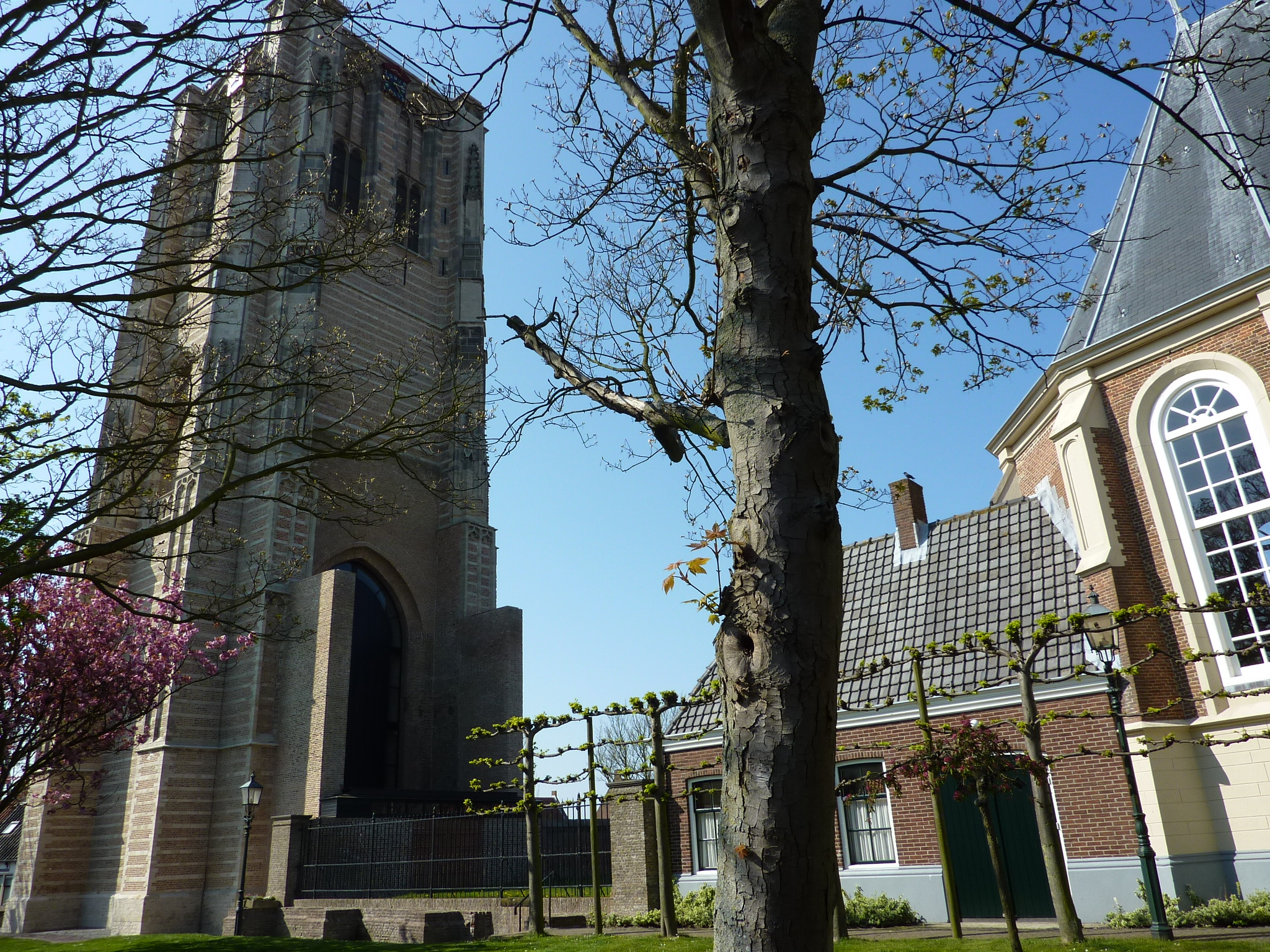
Catharina church, 2011
