= Pietertje van Splunter =

Dutch painter

Pietertje van Splunter (born 24 July 1968 in Goedereede) is a painter living in the Netherlands. She attended the Royal Academy of Art in The Hague. In the beginning of the 90's she worked on a series of postcards which she had sent to herself while travelling. In recent years she has seriously studied connections between painting and spatial consciousness.

== Selected exhibitions ==
- 2023: What used to be a beautiful villa, Billytown, The Hague.
- 2010: Edged, Stichting Ruimtevaart, The Hague (with Ellen Rodenberg).
