= Rurik (disambiguation) =

Rurik was a semi-legendary Varangian chieftain of the Rus'. Rurik or Ruric may also refer to:

- Dynasty of Rurik, allegedly founded by the Varangian chieftain
- Rurik (given name), a list of people named Rurik, Ruric or Ryurik
- Peter Ruric, a pen name of American pulp fiction author and screenwriter George Caryl Sims (1902–1966)
- Rado Ruric, a fictional enemy of Jim Anthony, a pulp fiction character
- Russian ship Rurik, four ships

== See also ==
- Rurik Expedition, a Russian circumnavigation of the world that took place from 1815 to 1818
