= Rodrick =

Rodrick or Rodricks may refer to:

== People by given name ==
- Rod Rutledge (born 1975), American NFL football player
- Rodrick Del Rodgers (born 1960), American NFL football player
- Rod Hill (born 1959), American NFL football player
- Rodrick Likando (born 1979), Namibian politician
- Rod Monroe (American football) (born 1976), American football player
- Rodrick Rhodes (born 1973), American professional basketball player

== People by surname ==
- Michael Rodrick (born 1970), American actor
- Stephen Rodrick, American journalist
- Dan Rodricks, American columnist and radio talk-show host
- Wendell Rodricks (1960–2020), Indian fashion designer

== Other uses ==
- 18689 Rodrick, an asteroid
- Rodrick Bridge, a historical bridge in Licking, Ohio; see List of bridges on the National Register of Historic Places in Ohio
- Rodrick Heffley, a Diary of a Wimpy Kid character

== See also ==
- Roderick
