= Commando Squadron (Bahamas) =

Commando Squadron is an elite special force within the Commonwealth of the Bahamas. It is the amphibious infantry unit of the Royal Bahamas Defence Force. It is composed of approximately 150 marines equipped with only light infantry weapons. Marines selected for this unit go through three months of training, where they are taught field craft, small craft handling, land navigation, close quarter battle and small arms handling. After completion they go through a five-month Commando Course where they are additionally trained in reconnaissance and counter-terrorism. The Combat Diver and Military Diver courses are optional, but may be mandatory depending on the need for divers throughout the Defence Force. Marines successful in completing the Commando course are distinguished by a red dagger and commando tab worn on the left sleeve pocket and a black beret badge as opposed to the bronze badge worn by other members of the Defence Force.

== Physical requirements ==
- Pushups: 75 in under 2 mins
- Situps: 85 in under 2 mins
- Pullups: 20 (not timed)
- Burpees: 41 in under 1.5 mins
- 1.5 mile run: 10 mins
- 300 m swim: 10 mins
- Water tread: 3 mins
- Dive: 25 ft
- The physical assessment is done in battle dress uniform and boots. Additionally the selected commandos do a 1-mile swim with a ruck sack and weapon along with a 1-hour tread.

== Weapons used ==
- IMI Uzi
- IMI Galil ARM
- FN FAL DMR
- The FN MAG has been used in training exercises as a support machine gun.
- Colt M4A1
- Beretta 92FS
- SIG Sauer P226
- Remington 870
- Remington 700

== See also ==
- Royal Bahamas Defence Force
- Government of the Bahamas
