= Roddy =

Roddy is a surname and a masculine given name, often a short form of Roderick.

== People ==
=== Given name ===
- Roddy Beaubois (born 1988), French basketball player
- Roddy Blackjack (c. 1927-2013), Canadian Chief of the Little Salmon/Carmacks First Nation of the Yukon
- Roddy Bottum (born 1960), American musician
- Roddy Burdine (1886-1936), American businessman
- Roddy Collins (born 1961), Irish football (soccer) player and manager
- Roddy Connolly (1901–1980), Irish politician
- Roddy Cordy-Simpson (born 1944), British general
- Roddy Darragon (born 1983), French cross-country skier
- Roddy Doyle (born 1958), Irish novelist
- Roddy Ellias (born 1949), Canadian musician
- Roddy Estwick (born 1961), Barbadian cricketer
- Roddy Evans (born 1934), Welsh rugby player
- Roddy Frame (born 1964), Scottish singer-songwriter and musician
- Roddy Frame (swimmer) (born 1941) English swimmer
- Roddy Georgeson (born 1948), Egyptian footballer
- Roddy Grant (footballer) (born 1966), British footballer
- Roddy Grant (rugby union) (born 1987), Scottish rugby player
- Roddy Hart, Scottish singer–songwriter
- Roddy Hughes (1891-1970), British actor
- Roddy Jackson (born 1942), American musician
- Roddy Lamb (1899–?), American football player
- Roddy Langmuir (born 1960), British alpine skier
- Roddy Lee (born 1950) Chinese/American athlete
- Roddy Llewellyn, English landscape gardener
- Roddy Lorimer (born 1953), Scottish musician
- Roddy Manley (born 1965), Scottish footballer
- Roddy Maude-Roxby (born 2 April 1930), English actor
- Roddy McCorley (died 1800), Irish rebel
- Roddy (R.S.) MacDonald (born 1955), Scottish/Australian bagpipes composer
- Roddy McDowall (1928–1998), British actor
- Roddy McKenzie (born 1975), Scottish footballer
- Roddy MacLennan (born 1989), Scottish footballer
- Roddy McMillan (1923–1979), Scottish actor and playwright
- Roddy Paterson (born 1993), Scottish footballer
- Roddy Piper (1954-2015), Scottish-Canadian professional wrestler
- Roddy Radiation (born 1955), English musician
- Roddy Ricch (born 1998), real name Rodrick Wayne Moore Jr., American rapper, singer, songwriter, and record producer
- Roddy Scott (1971-2002), British photojournalist
- Roddy Vargas (born 1978), Australian footballer
- Roddy White (born 1981), American football player
- Roddy Woomble (born 1976), Scottish singer

=== Surname ===
- David Roddy (born 2001), American basketball player
- David Roddy (law enforcement), American retired police officer/chief
- Dennis Roddy (born 1954), American journalist
- Derek Roddy (born 1972), American drummer and snake breeder
- Joseph Roddy (1897–1965), Irish politician
- Martin Roddy (1887-1948), Irish politician
- Patrick Roddy (1827–1895), Irish colonel
- Rod Roddy (1937–2003), American television announcer

=== Stage name ===
- Young Roddy, American rapper Roderick Brisco (born 1986)

== Fictional characters ==
- Roddy, in the British musical Boogie Nights (1997)
- Roddy, in the Roddy the Roadman children's book series
- Roddy, in the children's fantasy novel The Merlin Conspiracy
- Roddy, in the video game Top Hunter: Roddy & Cathy
- Roddy Berwick, in the film Downhill
- Roddy MacStew, a supporting character in Freakazoid! and Freakazoid's mentor
- Roddy St. James, the protagonist in Flushed Away

== See also ==
- Rod, a given name
- Roddie, a given name and surname
