= David Roddy (law enforcement) =

American police officer

Chief of the Chattanooga Police Department
- In office August 22, 2017 – July 30, 2021
- Appointed by: Andy Berke
- Preceded by: Fred Fletcher

Personal details
- Born: Chattanooga, Tennessee, U.S.
- Children: 2
- Education: Middle Tennessee State University

David Roddy is an American retired police officer who was chief of the Chattanooga Police Department.

== Early life and education ==
Roddy was born and raised in Chattanooga, Tennessee. He graduated from Tyner High School. Roddy completed a B.S. at Middle Tennessee State University.

== Career ==
Roddy began his career at the Chattanooga Police Department (CPD) c. 1994 as a patrol officer. He later served as captain of different divisions such as uniformed services and internal affairs.

Chief Fred Fletcher selected Roddy as chief of staff in 2014. Roddy served as acting chief when Fletcher was out of the office on personal leave.

Roddy was nominated as chief of the CPD by mayor Andy Berke and confirmed by the Chattanooga City Council on August 22, 2017. In his first year as chief, Roddy grew the department and built on existing policies and practices. In an effort to boost morale, Roddy changed the department's beard policy.

Roddy's tweet on May 27, 2020, condemning the murder of George Floyd brought praise and scrutiny. On May 30, he visited with peaceful protesters in downtown Chattanooga to answer their questions or concerns.

Roddy retired on July 30, 2021.

Roddy knows serves as Chief Operating Office for Hamilton County Government.

== Personal life ==
He is an outdoorsman and enjoys hunting and hiking. He is married to Shannon. They have two daughters.
