= HMBS Nassau =

Patrol boat in Bahamian military

HMBS Nassau (P-61)
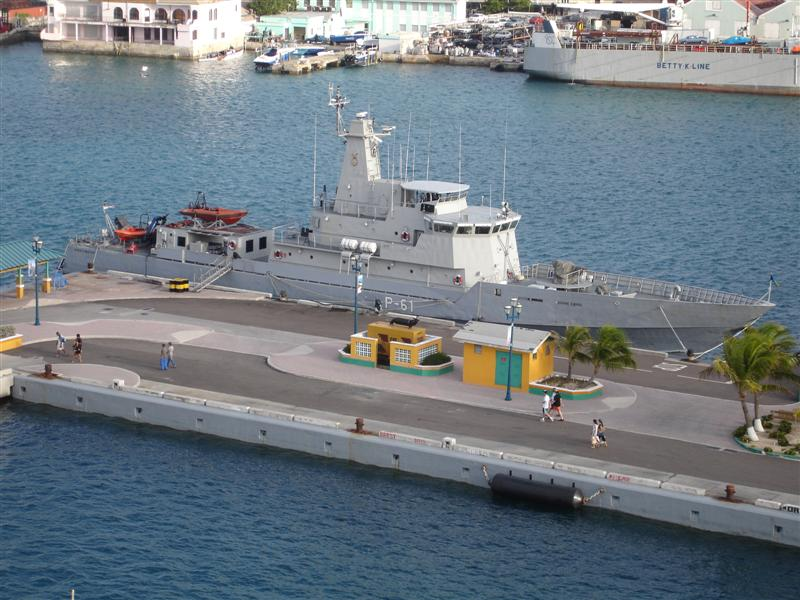
- HMBS Nassau docked at Nassau

History

Bahamas
- Owner: Royal Bahamas Defence Force
- Builder: Moss Point Marine

General characteristics
- Class & type: Offshore Patrol Vessel
- Length: 60.4 m (198 ft)

HMBS Nassau (P-61) is one of two patrol boats, with HMBS Bahamas (P-60), operated by the Bahamian military. Like her sister ship, Nassau is armed with several heavy Browning M2 .50 caliber machine guns and a light auto cannon. She is commonly used for capturing illegal immigrants (particularly from Haiti), anti-piracy and smuggling missions, hurricane relief, search and rescue, routine patrols, and assisting maritime police.

In August 2016 Nassau arrived in the Netherlands for a nine-month refit at the Damen Group's Maaskant shipyard at Stellendam.
