= HMBS Bahamas =

Bahamas offshore patrol vessel

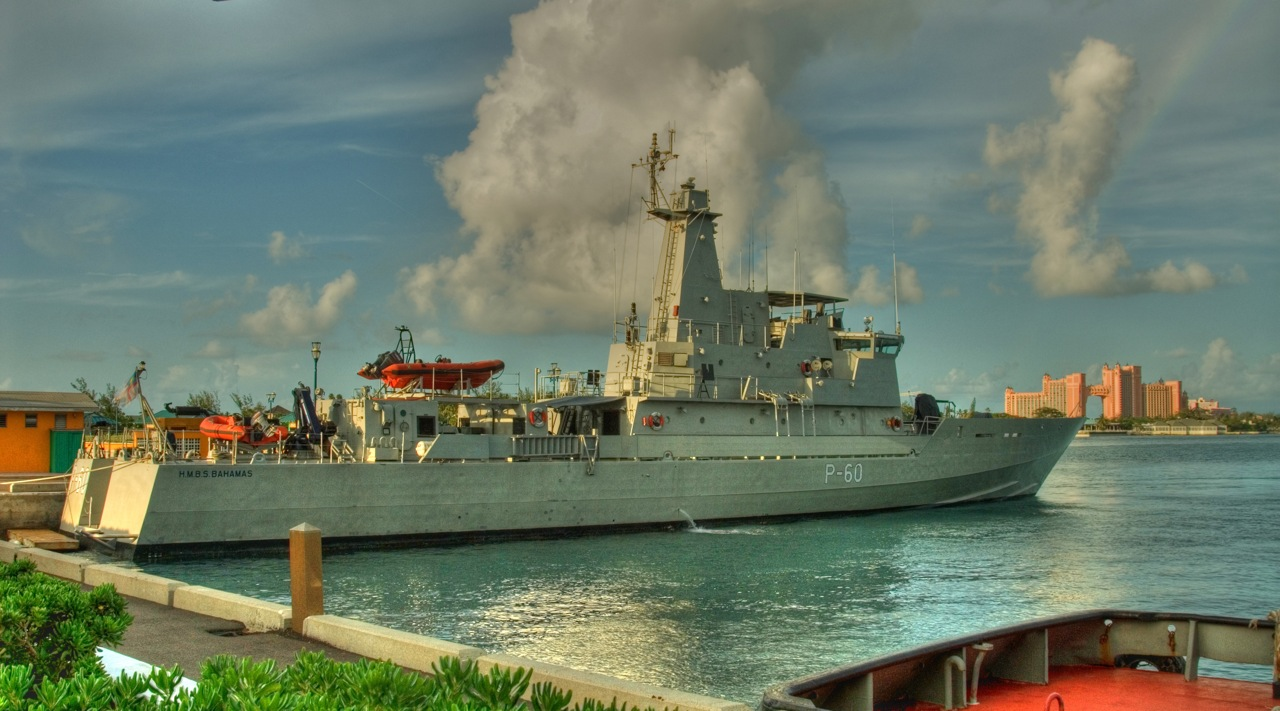
- HMBS Bahamas (P-60)

History

Bahamas
- Owner: Royal Bahamas Defence Force
- Builder: Moss Point Marine
- Acquired: 12 January 1999

General characteristics
- Class & type: Offshore Patrol Vessel
- Length: 60.4 m (198 ft)
- Speed: 24 knots
- Armament: 1 25mm Bushmaster low angle gun, heavy machine guns

HMBS Bahamas (P-60), along with sister ship HMBS Nassau (P-61), is a 198 foot Offshore Patrol Vessel delivered to the Royal Bahamas Defence Force on 12 January 1999. Both vessels were built by Moss Point Marine of Escatawpa, Mississippi (now VT Halter Marine) to a design by Vosper International Ltd, Naval Architects and Designers, Glasgow, UK. Bahamas serves the RBDF by patrolling Bahamian waters in anti-poaching and illegal immigration control missions, notably interdicting Haitian vessels, as well as drug enforcement missions in cooperation with the United States Coast Guard and Drug Enforcement Administration as part of Operation Bahamas, Turks and Caicos (OPBAT).

Two small Rigid Hull Inflatable Boats, 4 .50 Caliber M2 machine guns mounted aft and at mid-ship, and a larger 25 mm bow-mounted automatic cannon provide flexible capabilities in the face of different contingencies. A full galley, sick-bay and living quarters allow Bahamas to fulfill longer duration missions than many of the RBDF's other smaller vessels.

The comparatively large size of Bahamas excludes her from use of the RBDF's primary facility at Coral Harbour on New Providence's west coast, so the vessel is based at Prince George Wharf in Nassau Harbour.

During 2016 Bahamas has been receiving a major refit at a local Bahamian yard, with the assistance of the Dutch Damen Group.

== Further information ==
- Haitian Vessel Interdiction in Cooperation with USCGC Reliance: "RELIANCE ASSIST IN RESCUE OF HAITIAN MIGRANTS" (Press release). United States Coast Guard. 2 December 2006.
