= Goedereede =

- City
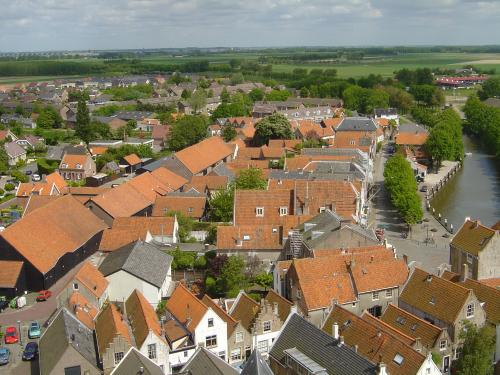

- Flag Coat of arms

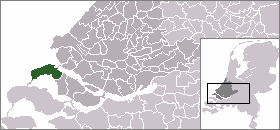
- Coordinates: 51.82°N 3.98°E
- Country: Netherlands
- Province: South Holland
- Municipality: Goeree-Overflakkee

Area (2006)
  - Total: 153.85 km^{2} (59.40 sq mi)
  - Land: 71.32 km^{2} (27.54 sq mi)
  - Water: 82.53 km^{2} (31.87 sq mi)

Population (1 January 2012)
  - Total: 2,050
- Time zone: UTC+1 (CET)
  - Summer (DST): UTC+2 (CEST)

City centre (dark green) and the statistical district (light green) of Goedereede in the former municipality of Goedereede.

Goedereede (Dutch pronunciation: [ˌɣudəˈreːdə]) is a little city and former municipality in the western Netherlands, in the province of South Holland. The former municipality had a population of about 11,000 in 2010. It consisted of the west part of the island of Goeree-Overflakkee. Goedereede merged with Dirksland, Middelharnis, and Oostflakkee into the new municipality of Goeree-Overflakkee on January 1, 2013. The town have a population of about 2,000 in 2012.

Goedereede received city rights in 1312 from Sir Gereart van Voorne.

The future Pope Adrian VI (1459–1523) was at one time pastor of the parish church of Goedereede. During a great fire in Goedereede in 1482 the old "Katharina Church" and its tower were destroyed.

A new church was erected in 1512 beside the Toren van Goedereede (Goederede Tower), which still stands today.

Goederede went into a long decline, losing trade to better-sited ports. There were insufficient funds to maintain the church. In 1706 the dilapidated building was pulled down, but the tower was preserved.

The former municipality of Goedereede also included the communities of, from west to east, Ouddorp, Goedereede (with Havenhoofd), Oostdijk, and Stellendam.

== Noted residents ==
- Pietertje van Splunter
