= Roderick Bowe =

Bahamian Navy officer

- Born: 22 January 1961 (age 65)
- Relatives: HMBS Flamingo; HMBS Marlin
- Military career
- Allegiance: Bahamas
- Branch: Royal Bahamas Defence Force
- Service years: 1982-present
- Rank: Commodore
- Commands: Commando Squadron
- Awards: Long Service Medal; Good Conduct Medal
- Other work: Senior Assistant Director, Bahamas Immigration Department

Roderick Bowe is a Bahamian military officer and the 6th commodore of the Royal Bahamas Defence Force. He superseded Commodore Clifford W. Scavella who left office on January 21, 2009 who is now the special envoy to Haiti. In a public statement, Prime Minister Hubert Ingraham, stated that Mr. Bowe must be "proactive and knowledgeable about the country".

== Personal life ==
Commander Bowe was born in New Providence on 22 January 1961 to Bert and Corine Bowe. He is married to Joanne and has two children (Kristine Ashley (18) and Kristen Alexis (13))

== Career ==
Commodore Bowe joined the Royal Bahamas Defence Force in 1982 in the aftermath of the HMBS Flamingo incident of 1980. He began his training in the Young Officers Royal Navy Course. The National Security Council of the Bahamas recommended to His Excellency Governor General Arthur D. Hanna that then Commander Roderick Bowe be promoted to Defence Force commodore. At the time, he was a member of the senior staff at the Bahamas Immigration Department, a post he had been in since 2006. NSC also recommended that Tellis Bethel, also a commander, be moved up to deputy commander. Bethel is the first deputy commander to hold the title of captain.

== Education ==
In 1978, as deputy head boy, Bowe graduated the Jordan Prince William High School. He was enrolled in the College of the Bahamas where he graduated with a Biology major. He received his military training at the Britannia Royal Naval College in Dartmouth, England. Bowe became a certified commercial pilot at the Flight Safety Academy in Florida. In 2007, Bowe received a degree in Professional Management from Nova Southeastern University. He is also a fellow of the Center for Hemispheric Defence Studies and is a 1999 graduate of the US Naval War College.

== See also ==
- Royal Bahamas Defence Force
- Britannia Royal Naval College
