= Oostdijk, South Holland =

Oostdijk
- Hamlet
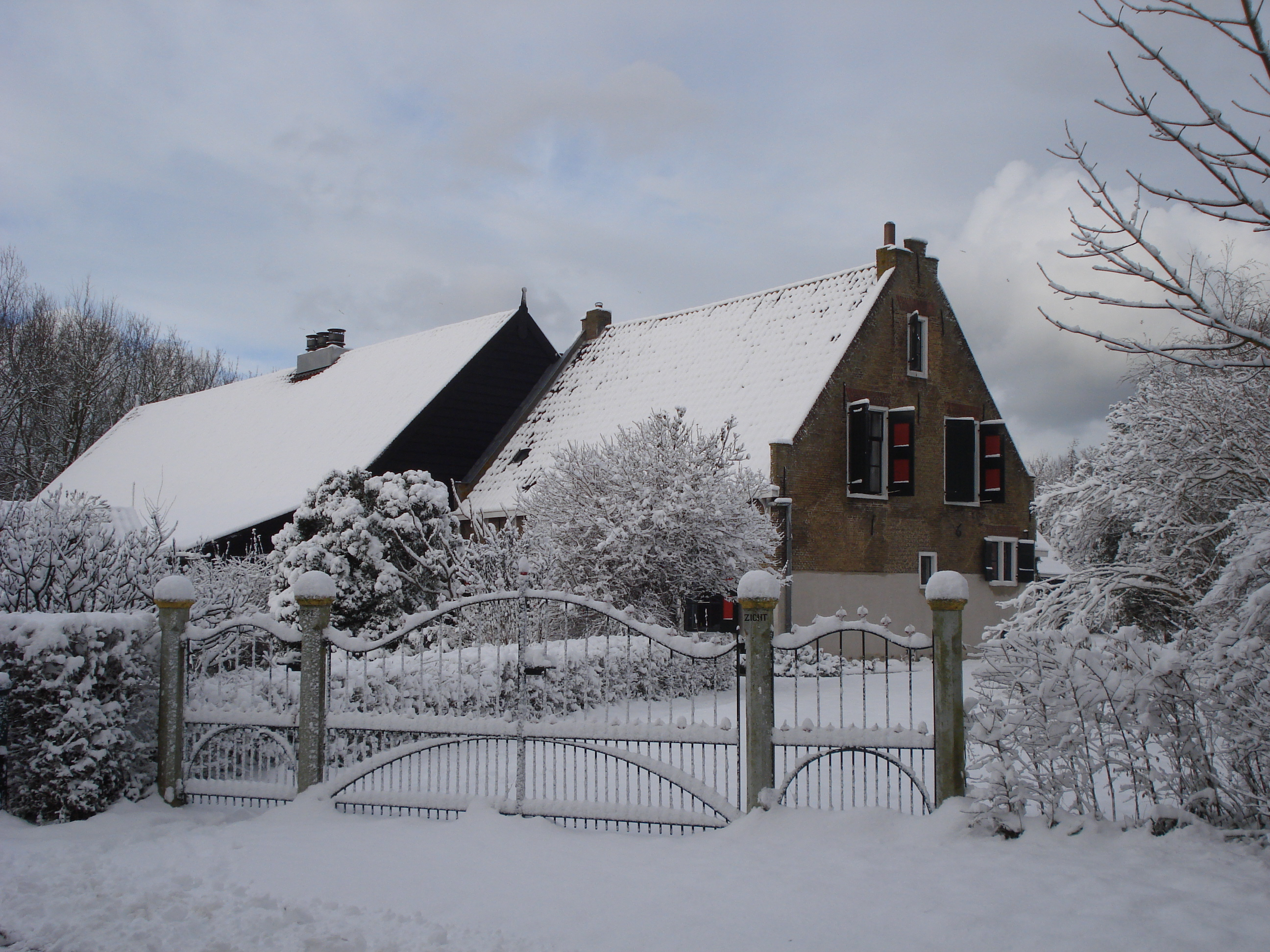
- Farm Zeezicht in Oostdijk

- Location in the province of South Holland in the Netherlands Location in the Netherlands
- Coordinates: 51.8258°N 3.9586°E
- Country: Netherlands
- Province: South Holland
- Municipality: Goeree-Overflakkee

Oostdijk is a hamlet in the Dutch province of South Holland. It is a part of the municipality of Goeree-Overflakkee, and lies about 13 km west of Hellevoetsluis.

It was first mentioned in 1515 as "gelegen in Westvoirne bijder Goederee inder banne vanden oestdijck", and means "eastern dike". It is named after the eponymous polder.

Oostdijk is not a statistical entity, It is considered part of Goedereede. It consists of about 100 houses.
