= Military ranks of Bahamas =

The Military ranks of The Bahamas are the military insignia used by the Royal Bahamas Defence Force. The Bahamas does not have an army or air force, and the entire defence force is composed of the navy. Being a member of the Commonwealth of Nations, The Bahamas shares a rank structure similar to that of the United Kingdom's Royal Navy.

== Commissioned officer ranks ==
The rank insignia of commissioned officers.

Rank group	General / flag officers	Senior officers				Junior officers
Royal Bahamas Defence Force
Royal Bahamas Defence Force	Commodore	Captain	Senior commander	Commander	Lieutenant commander	Senior lieutenant	Lieutenant	Sub-lieutenant	Acting sub-lieutenant

=== Student officer ranks ===
Rank group	Student officer
Royal Bahamas Defence Force
Royal Bahamas Defence Force	Midshipman

== Other ranks ==
The rank insignia of non-commissioned officers and enlisted personnel.

Rank group	Senior NCOs			Junior NCOs	Enlisted
Royal Bahamas Defence Force						No insignia
Royal Bahamas Defence Force	Force chief petty officer	Chief petty officer	Petty officer	Leading marine	Able marine	Marine
Royal Bahamas Defence Force (1973–2004)					No insignia	No insignia
Royal Bahamas Defence Force (1973–2004)	Fleet chief petty officer	Chief petty officer	Petty officer	Leading rate	Able rate	Seaman
