= Gerald Roderick =

American politician

Member of the U.S. House of Representatives from Missouri's 19th district

Missouri House of Representatives
- Incumbent
- Assumed office 1973

Personal details
- Born: 1924 Upton, Missouri, US
- Died: 1998 (aged 73–74)
- Party: Democratic
- Children: 4
- Occupation: doctor

Gerald J. Roderick (December 22, 1924 - December 20, 1998) was an American Democratic politician who served in the Missouri House of Representatives. He was born in Upton, Missouri, and was educated at Houston High School in Texas County, the University of Missouri, the Kansas City College of Osteopathic Medicine, and the California College of Medicine. He joined the United States Navy and served as a pharmacist's mate in the Pacific Theater during World War II. In 1994, he retired as a doctor. Roderick died two days before his 75th birthday, following complications from cardiac bypass surgery.
