= Chattanooga Police Department =

Law enforcement agency in Tennessee, US

Agency overview
- Formed: 1852

Jurisdictional structure
- Legal jurisdiction: City of Chattanooga

Operational structure
- Headquarters: 3410 Amnicola Highway; Chattanooga, Tennessee, 37406
- Sworn members: c. 500
- Agency executive: Jonathon Chambers, Chief of Police
- Divisions: 3: Uniformed Services; Investigative Services; Administration & Support

Website
- Official website

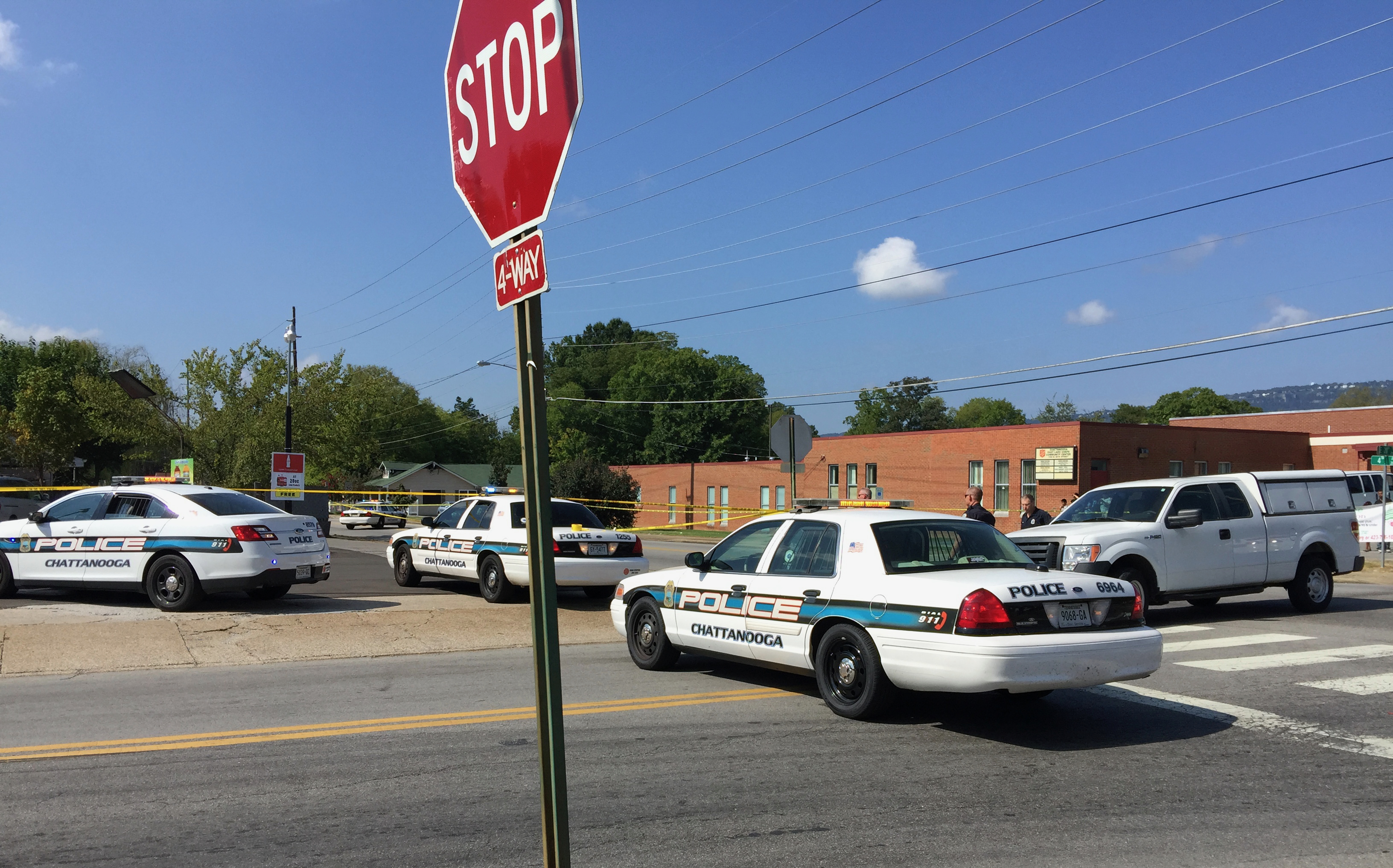
The Chattanooga Police Department (CPD) responds to a call in East Lake, Tennessee, on Sep. 7, 2015

The Chattanooga Police Department (CPD) is the primary law enforcement organization serving Chattanooga, Tennessee, in the United States. The department is headed by a chief of police, with one deputy chief and three assistant chiefs commanding the major bureaus of the department: the Uniformed Services Bureau, the Investigative Services Bureau, and the Administration and Support Services Bureau.

== History and racial relations ==
The police department dates from 1852 and has evolved over the decades. The CPD made Chattanooga one of the first major Southern cities to have black police officers starting in 1883. However, the police officers were subsequently removed from the force and reintroduced on a permanent basis on August 11, 1948. The seven officers, including Officers Thaddeus Arnold, Singer Askins, W.B. Baulridge, C.E. Black, Morris Glenn, Arthur Heard, and Thomas Patterson, were initially restricted to walking beats in black neighborhoods. In 1960, black police officers were authorized to patrol all neighborhoods and arrest white citizens. Therefore, the Chattanooga Police Department integrated decades earlier than most other Southern police departments.

In the 169 year history of the Chattanooga Police, 24 officers and 1 K9 have died serving the citizens of Chattanooga.

== Uniformed services ==
The Uniformed Services Bureau is commanded by an assistant chief, and includes the Patrol Division and Special Operations Division, both under the command of a captain, with lieutenants and sergeants acting and unit and shift commanders.

== Investigative services ==
The Investigative Services Bureau is commanded by an assistant chief, and includes the Property Crimes and Major Crimes units, the Criminal Investigations Division, the Special Investigations unit, and the Intelligence/Computer Crimes unit.

== Administration and support services ==
The Administration & Support Services Bureau is commanded by an assistant chief, and includes a number of support and civilian units, including the technology director, training and recruiting division, operational support division, technical services division, budget/finance director, and the fleet, facilities, and security director.

== Rank structure ==
Title	Insignia
Chief of Police	
Deputy chief	
Assistant chief	
Captain	
Lieutenant	
Sergeant	
Master patrolman (non-rank)	
Field training officer	
Police officer/Detective	

== See also ==
- List of law enforcement agencies in Tennessee
