= Rorik I =

Rorik I (died 844) was a Danish Viking chieftain. Having been expelled from Denmark with his brothers in 814, Rorik raided Friesland and parts of the Carolingian Empire. He was the father of Knut Roriksson, prominent member of the Great Heathen Army.
