= Stellendam =

- Village
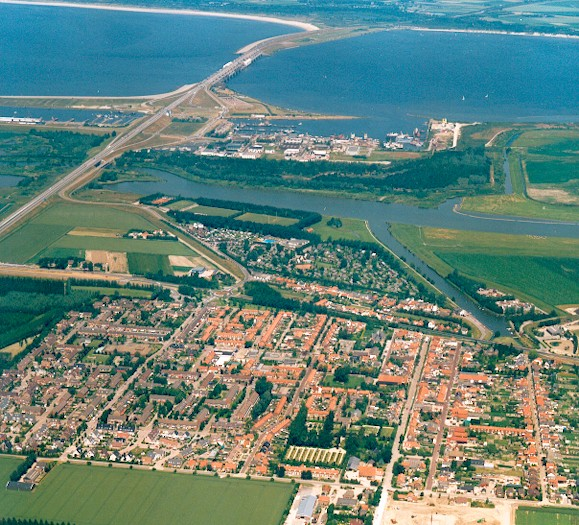
- Aerial view

- Location in the province of South Holland in the Netherlands Location in the Netherlands
- Coordinates: 51.8061882°N 4.0243945°E
- Country: Netherlands
- Province: South Holland
- Municipality: Goeree-Overflakkee

Area
  - Total: 24.37 km^{2} (9.41 sq mi)
- Elevation: 0.6 m (2.0 ft)

Population (2021)
  - Total: 3,520
  - Density: 144/km^{2} (374/sq mi)
- Time zone: UTC+1 (CET)
  - Summer (DST): UTC+2 (CEST)
- Postal code: 3251
- Dialing code: 0187

Stellendam is a village in the Dutch province of South Holland. It is a part of the municipality of Goeree-Overflakkee, and lies about 9 km west of Hellevoetsluis.

== History ==
The village was first mentioned around 1750 as "'t Stelle Gors". The current name is a combination of "dam" and "small terps on a shoal which shepherds to use in case of floods". The dam refers to the Statendam which was constructed in 1751. Stellendam developed after the dam was built. In 1780, the Eendrachtspolder was enclosed by a dike, and shortly after a courthouse was constructed in Stellendam.

The Dutch Reformed church is a simple aisleless church with ridge turret which was built in 1819. The inn 't Wapen van Stellendam was built between 1781 and 1782 as court house and inn. The buildings was modified and plastered in the 19th century.

The grist mill Korenlust was built in 1856. It was in service until 1957. In 1961, it was bought by the municipality and restored between 1964 and 1965. The windmill is regularly in service on a voluntary basis.

Stellendam was home to 666 people in 1840. It was severely affected during the North Sea flood of 1953. Afterwards, the dike was heightened and a new harbour was built after the construction of the Haringvlietdam.

Stellendam was a separate municipality between 1817 and 1966, when it became part of Goedereede. In 2013, it became part of the municipality of Goeree-Overflakkee.

== Gallery ==
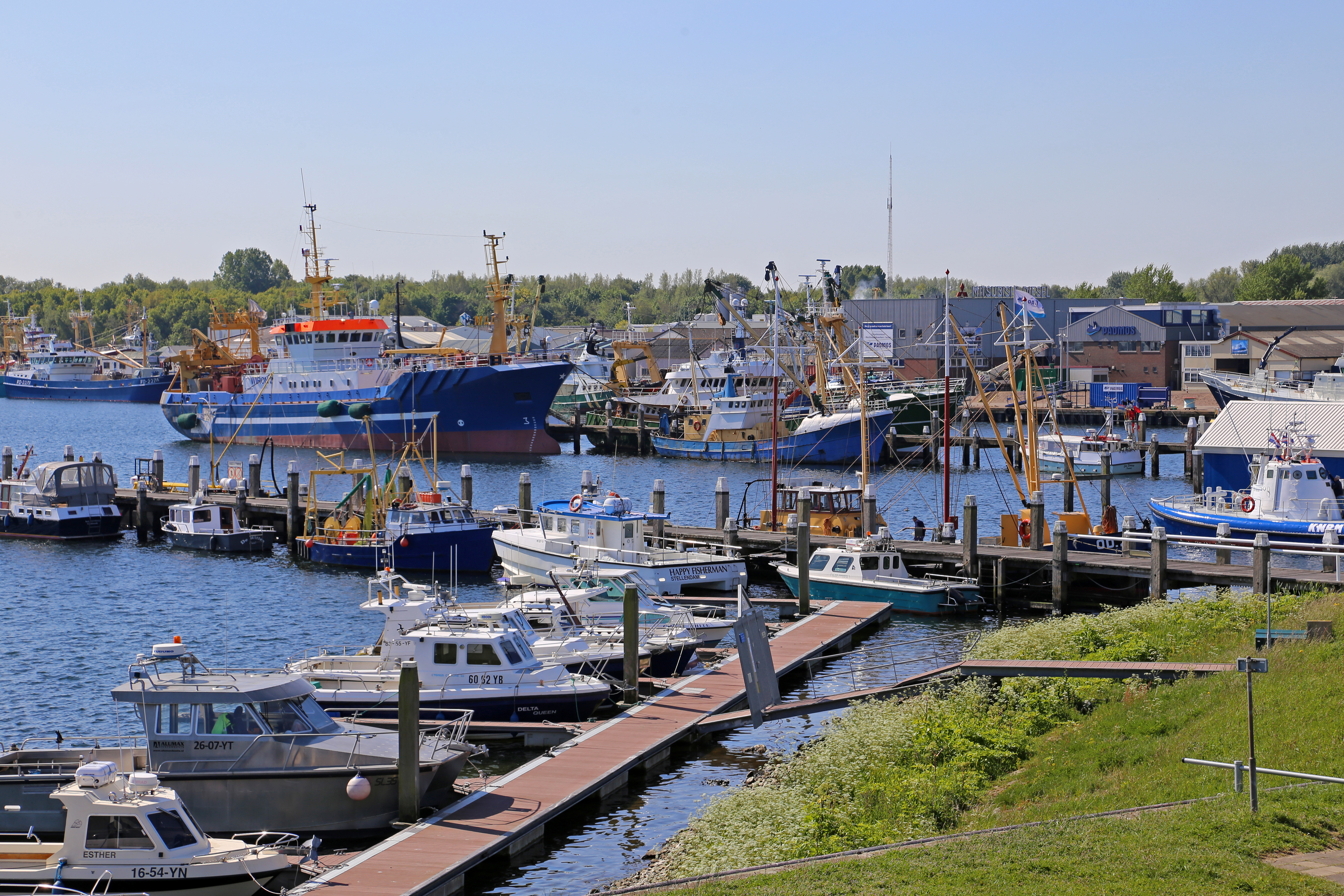
Harbour of Stellendam

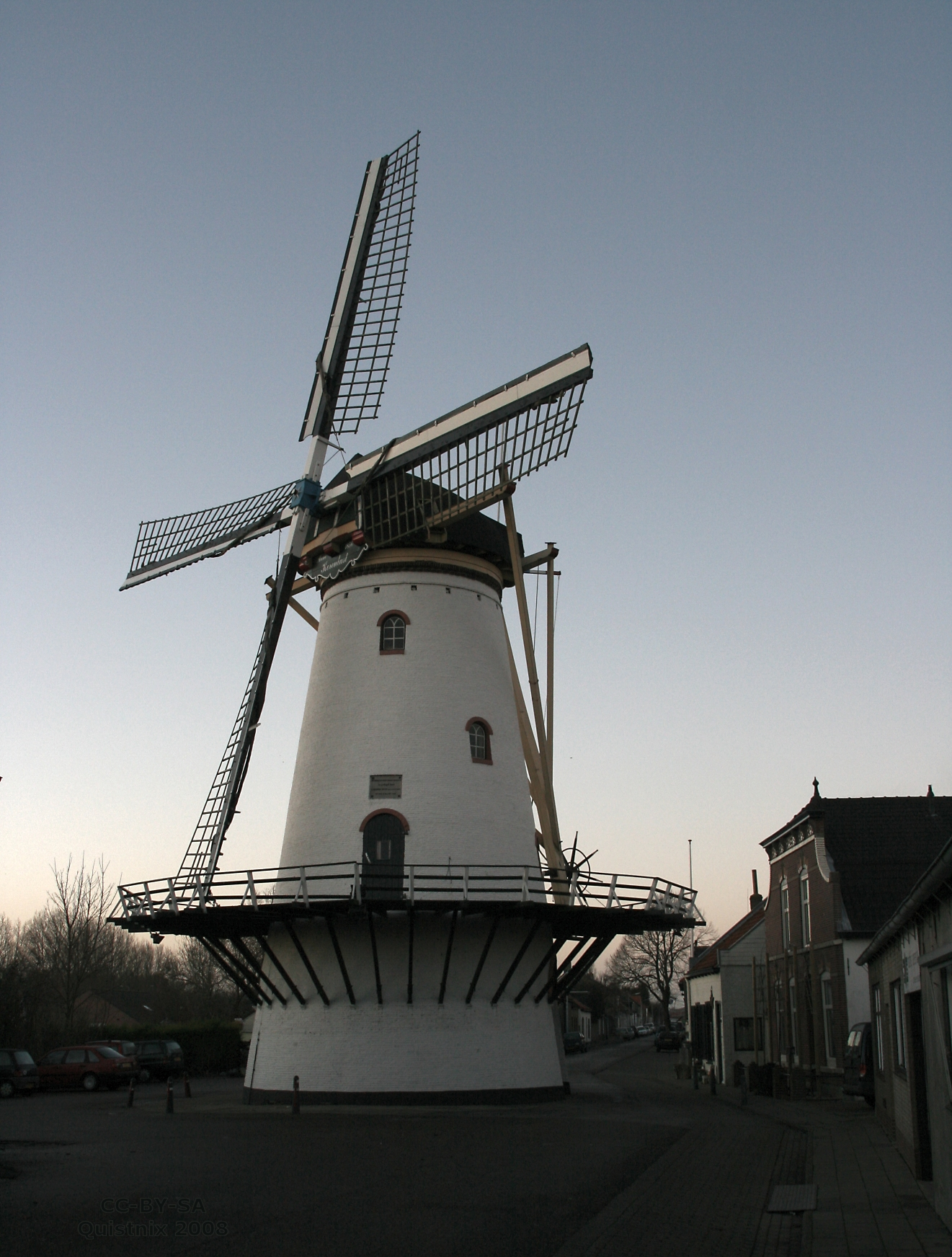
Windmill Korenlust

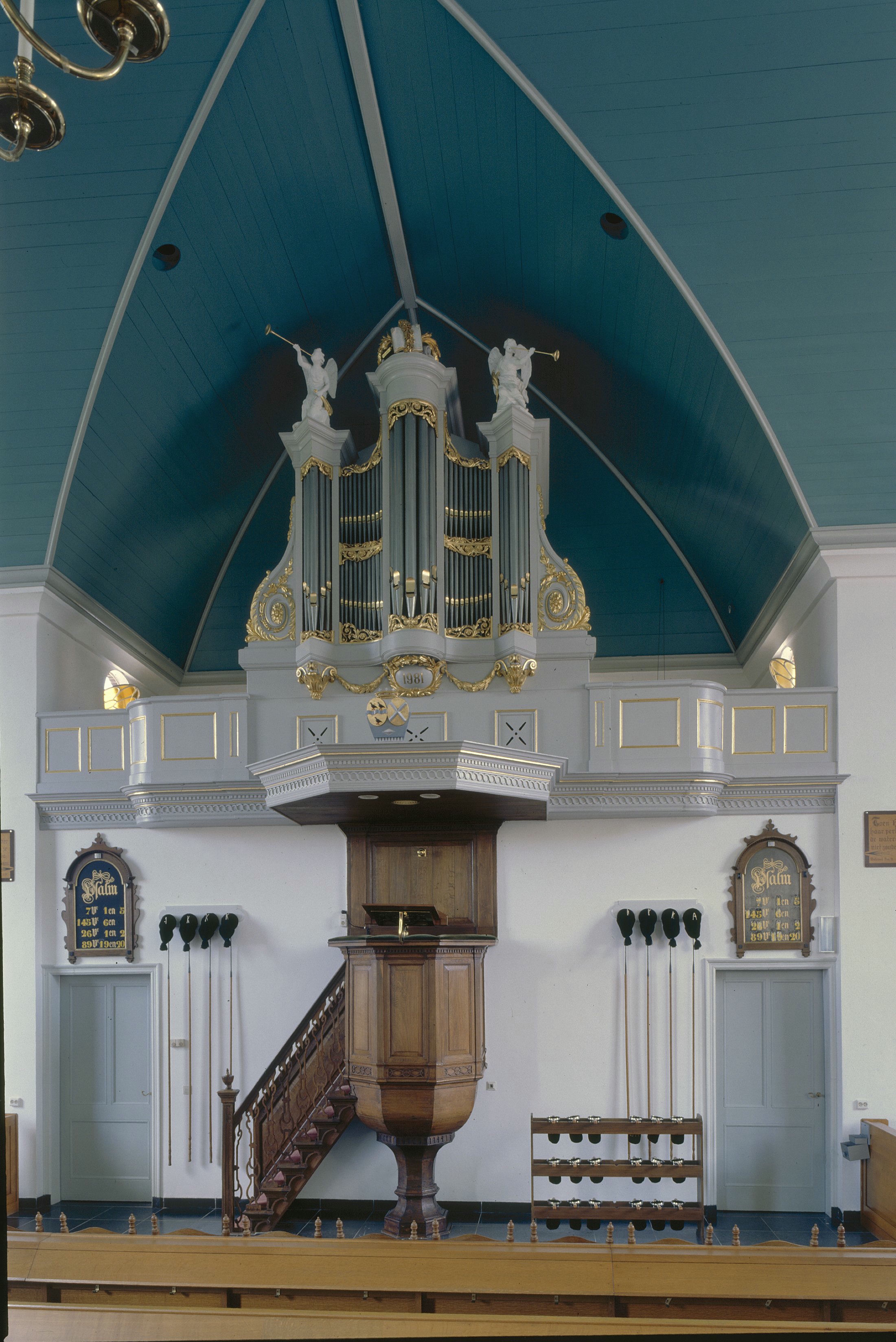
Inside of the Dutch Reformed church
