= Damen Stan Patrol 3007 =

Dutch patrol vessel class

The Damen Stan Patrol 3007 is a patrol vessel in The Damen Group's family of Damen Stan Patrol vessels. The base design is built around an axe bow, and shallow draft.

Vessels built for the Bahamas are equipped with a stern launching ramp, so its waterjet powered pursuit boat can be launched and retrieved without requiring the vessel to first come to a stop. The Bahamian vessels are designed to carry a complement of 13 crew for up to a week.

Four 3007 vessels will be built for the Bahamas. The first one was to be delivered in mid 2015.

Damen offers five choices of engines for the vessel, which provide top speeds between 22 and 32 knots.
