= Royal Bahamas Defence Force =

Armed forces of the Bahamas

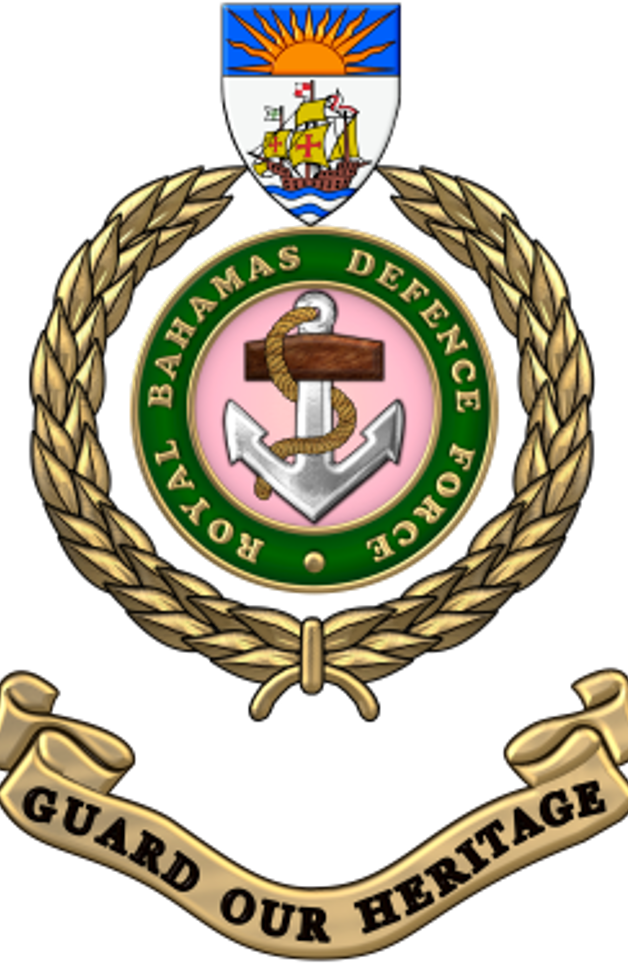
- Emblem of the Royal Bahamas Defence Force
- Founded: 1980; 46 years ago
- Service branches: Squadron; Commando Squadron; Military Police & Force Protection; Harbour Patrol; Port Security
- Headquarters: New Providence Island
- Website: rbdf.gov.bs

Leadership
- Commander-in-Chief: Charles III, King of the Bahamas, represented by Dame Cynthia A. Pratt, Governor-General of the Bahamas
- Minister of National Security: Myles K. LaRoda MP
- Commander of the Defence Force: Floyd Moxey

Personnel
- Military age: 18

Expenditure
- Budget: US$83,906,731 (2026)
- Percent of GDP: 0.5% (2018)

Related articles
- History: Haitian conflict
- Ranks: Military ranks of Bahamas

The Royal Bahamas Defence Force (RBDF) is the military of the Bahamas. Since the Bahamas does not have an army or an air force, its navy composes the entirety of its armed forces. Under The Defence Act, the Royal Bahamas Defence Force has been mandated to defend the Bahamas, protect its territorial integrity, patrol its waters, provide assistance in times of disaster, maintain order in conjunction with the law enforcement agencies of the Bahamas, and carry out any such duties as determined by the National Security Council. The Defence Force is also a member of CARICOM's Regional Security Task Force. The task force has seen action in the 1994 United Nations mandate in Haiti.

== History ==
By an Act of Parliament, the RBDF became an official entity on 31 March 1980, falling under the Ministry of National Security. Charles III, King of the Bahamas, is Commander-in-Chief of the Defence Force, while his ceremonial role is exercised by the Governor-General of the Bahamas. The Defence Force also has adopted its own system of medals and awards.

The only fighting action the RBDF has ever been involved in has been against Cuba. On 10 May 1980, HMBS Flamingo attempted to arrest two Cuban fishing vessels, the Ferrocem 165 and the Ferrocem 54, for poaching in Bahamian waters. In retaliation, two Cuban MiG-21s invaded Bahamas airspace and fired on the patrol boat. The Cubans sank the ship with their 23 mm cannons, and fired upon Marines in distress in the water. Fenrick Sturrup, Austin Smith, David Tucker and Edward Williams, all Bahamian Defence Force Marines, were killed in the attack. Fifteen crewmen and the Commander made it safely to Duncan Town, on Ragged Island, after being picked up by the fishing vessels they had boarded. The poachers were convicted in July 1980, and Cuba eventually admitted responsibility, paying the Bahamas $10 million in compensation for the incident.

The RBDF partook in the Kenyan-led Multinational Security Support Mission, which would be replaced by the United Nations mandated Gang Suppression Force. Kenyan-led Multinational Security Support Mission, which has since been replaced by the United Nations mandated Gang Suppression Force.

== The Force ==
The RBDF is a strictly naval force, differing from the rest of its Caribbean and Commonwealth of Nations counterparts in there being no regular land-based military formations. With about 1,600 members however, it is the largest of the Commonwealth Caribbean navies.

Serving members of the RBDF are assigned to one of seven major sub-sections: Headquarters, Administration, Engineering, Supply, Military Police, Operations and The Commando Squadron. The Operations Department contains the mobile arms of the RBDF and comprises the main operational units:

- The (Patrol) Squadron - The maritime unit tasked with operating all RBDF ships and small craft of the Harbour Patrol Unit (a security sub-unit)
- The Commando Squadron - An amphibious light-infantry unit, also tasked with additional national security/anti-crime duties
- The Air Wing - Which operates a fleet of fixed-wing aircraft for airborne surveillance and support tasks

The Commando Squadron is a sizable force of 500 Special Marine Commandos. Training is conducted with U.S. Special Operations Forces and British equivalents (such as the Royal Marines) in special operations and maritime warfare. A common training practice is to have a marine recruit conduct a two-mile swim carrying a forty-pound rucksack.

Several changes in equipment have been seen in the recent history of the RBDF. Originally British-style uniforms were worn by RBDF personnel; now U.S. Marine Corps-style digital woodland camouflage is worn (as opposed to the U.S. Army universal camouflage worn by The Royal Bahamas Police Force Drug Enforcement Unit). Similarly, the first weapons employed by the RBDF were the British Sterling submachine gun and the L1A1 SLR; now the U.S.-manufactured M4 carbine and the Heckler & Koch UMP submachine gun are employed for front-line duties.

The M101 105mm howitzer towed artillery piece is also employed, with fifteen guns in RBDF service.

== Structure ==
There are two career tracks in the RBDF: Marine (rating) & Officer (ranks). The enlisted personnel ranks range from Marine Seaman to Force Chief Petty Officer. The Officer ranks range from Midshipman to Commodore. The force is organized and trained along the lines of the British Royal Navy and many of the officers attend British service academies.

The Headquarters of the Defence Force are at The New National Security Complex on John F. Kennedy Drive, on New Providence Island. The commanding officer, known as "Commander Defence Force", is Commodore Dr. Raymond King. Additional bases are located in Matthew Town, Inagua, Marsh Harbour, Abaco, Freeport, Grand Bahama, and Gun Point, Ragged Island.

The RBDF uses the British Royal Navy style of rank insignia, and all ships' names carry the prefix HMBS (His Majesty’s Bahamian Ship).

Due to a lack of ships, most RBDF members do not spend time at sea, and are used for other military or non-military roles. The Defence Force is primarily an armed service, whose roles also encompass some aspects of a coast guard as well as a disaster relief agency. These roles require Defence Force personnel to assume the duties of: Naval and infantry personnel, Police Officers (Peace Officer), Customs Officers, Immigration Officers, Fisheries Inspectors, Emergency Rescue Personnel, Search & Rescue, Sentry, Detention Centre security and Maintenance of Navigational Aids.

The RBDF offers a high school course called the Royal Bahamas Defence Force Rangers.

Peacekeeping missions have been conducted with the participation of RBDF members in El Salvador and Haiti.

=== Ships ===
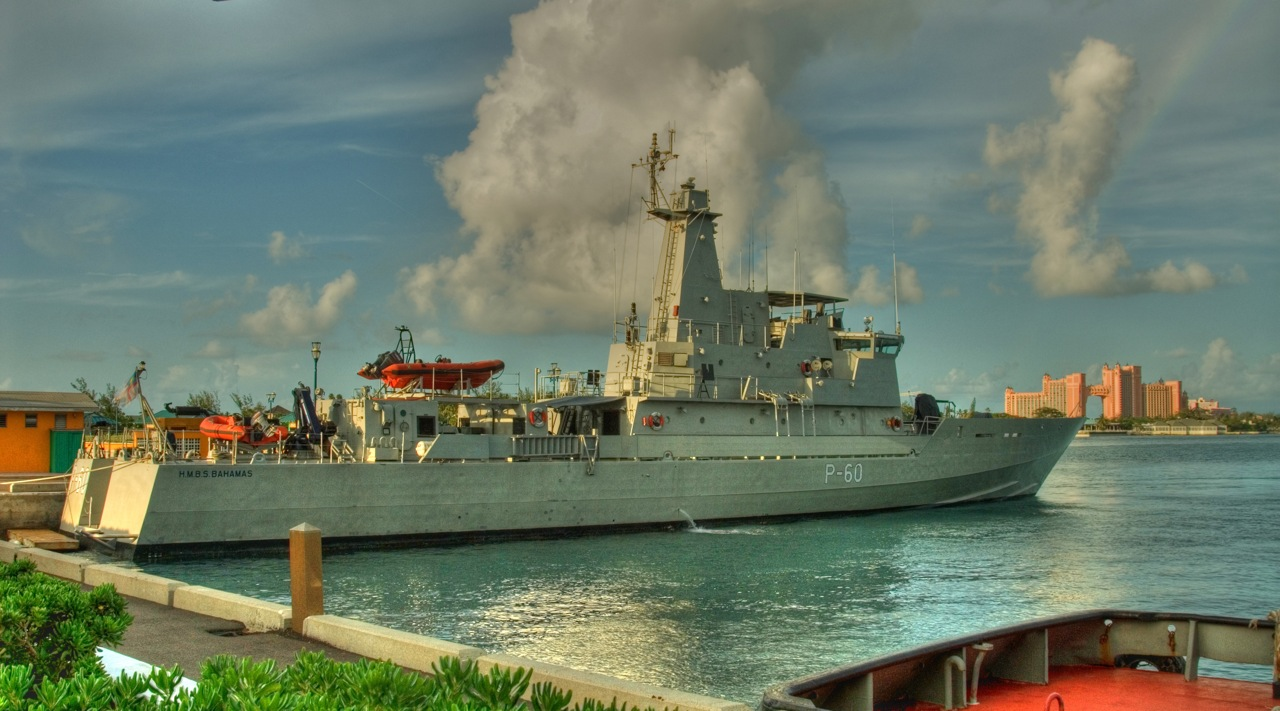
HMBS Bahamas P-60 in Nassau

The main ships in the force are two Bahamas-class and four Legend-class offshore patrol vessels. The latter are the first part of the nine-vessel acquisition contract signed with the Damen Shipyards Group in April 2013. Most of the missions consist of anti-poaching patrols, anti-drug patrols, immigration enforcement, search and rescue, or general National Defence missions.

Four of the new vessels will be Stan 4207 design, four of the new vessels will be Stan 3007 design, and the final vessel will be a 55-metre (180 ft) landing craft style transport craft, Damen Stan Lander 5612.

=== Equipment ===
Naval ensign of the RBDF

Vessel	Origin	Type	In service	Notes
Patrol boats
HMBS Bahamas	United States	Patrol boat	1	Bahamas class
HMBS Nassau	United States	Patrol boat	1	Bahamas class
HMBS Arthur Dion Hanna	Netherlands	Patrol boat	1	Legend class
HMBS Durward Knowles	Netherlands	Patrol boat	1	Legend class
HMBS Leon Livingstone Smith	Netherlands	Patrol boat	1	Legend class
HMBS Rolly Gray	Netherlands	Patrol boat	1	Legend class
HMBS Lignum Vitae	Netherlands	Patrol boat	1	Floral Class
HMBS Cascarilla	Netherlands	Patrol boat	1	Floral Class
HMBS Kamalame	Netherlands	Patrol boat	1	Floral Class
HMBS Madeira	Netherlands	Patrol boat	1	Floral Class
Landing craft
HMBS Lawrence Major	Netherlands	Auxiliary / Landing craft	1	Damen Stan Lander

== Air Wing ==
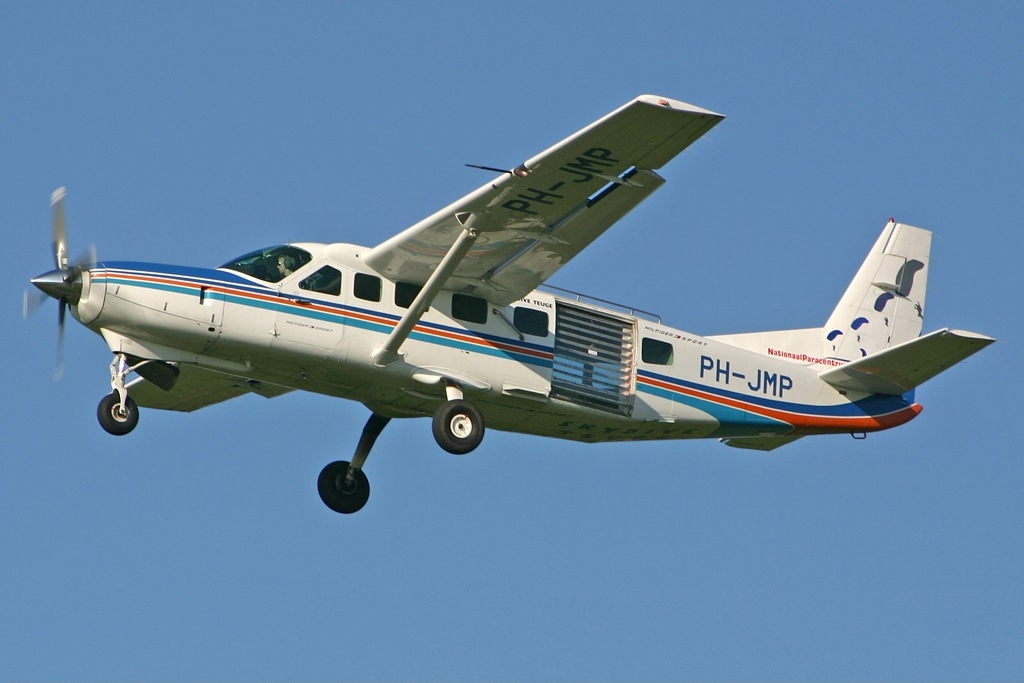
A Cessna 208B similar to this one is used by the RBDF

The Air Wing was formed on November 26, 1981, two years after the creation of the defence force. Initially three Aero Commander 500s were purchased from Bahamasair and operated, but these were sold off in 1990. In 1992, a Cessna 402 was added with a Cessna 421 soon after. By late 2005, the delivery of a Super King Air 350 took place. In May 2009, a Cessna 208 Turbine Caravan with floats and a Partenavia P.68 were delivered and significantly improved the RBDF's surveillance and transport capabilities.

Roundel available for use by RBDF Air Wing aircraft

In December 2019, Bahamas established the Bahamas Unmanned Aerial System programme, which contracted Swift Engineering to provide 55 unmanned aerial vehicles.

=== Current air fleet ===
Aircraft	Origin	Type	Variant	In service	Notes
Transport
Cessna 208	United States	Transport / Utility	208B	1	
Partenavia P.68	Italy	Transport / Utility		1	

=== Retired aircraft ===
Retired aircraft include Aero Commander 500, Beechcraft Super King Air 350, Cessna 402, Cessna 421.
