= Rurik (given name) =

Rurik was a semi-legendary Varangian chieftain of the Rus'. Other people with the given name Rurik, Ruric or Ryurik include:

- Rurik Rostislavich (died 1092), East Slavic prince
- Rurik Rostislavich (c. 1140–1215), Prince of Novgorod, Prince of Belgorod, Grand Prince of Kiev and Prince of Chernigov
- Rúrik Gíslason (born 1988), Icelandic former footballer
- Rúrik Theodór Haraldsson (1926–2003), Icelandic actor, musician and voice actor
- Ryurik Ivnev (1891–1981), Russian poet, novelist and translator
- Ryurik Lonin (1930–2009), Russian collector of Veps folklore
- Ruric Nevel Roark (1859–1909), Eastern Kentucky University's first president
- Ruric Wrigley (1883–1979), British astronomer

== See also ==
- Rorik of Dorestad (c. 810–c. 880), Danish Viking who ruled parts of Friesland
