= Axe bow =

Wave-piercing type of a ship's bow

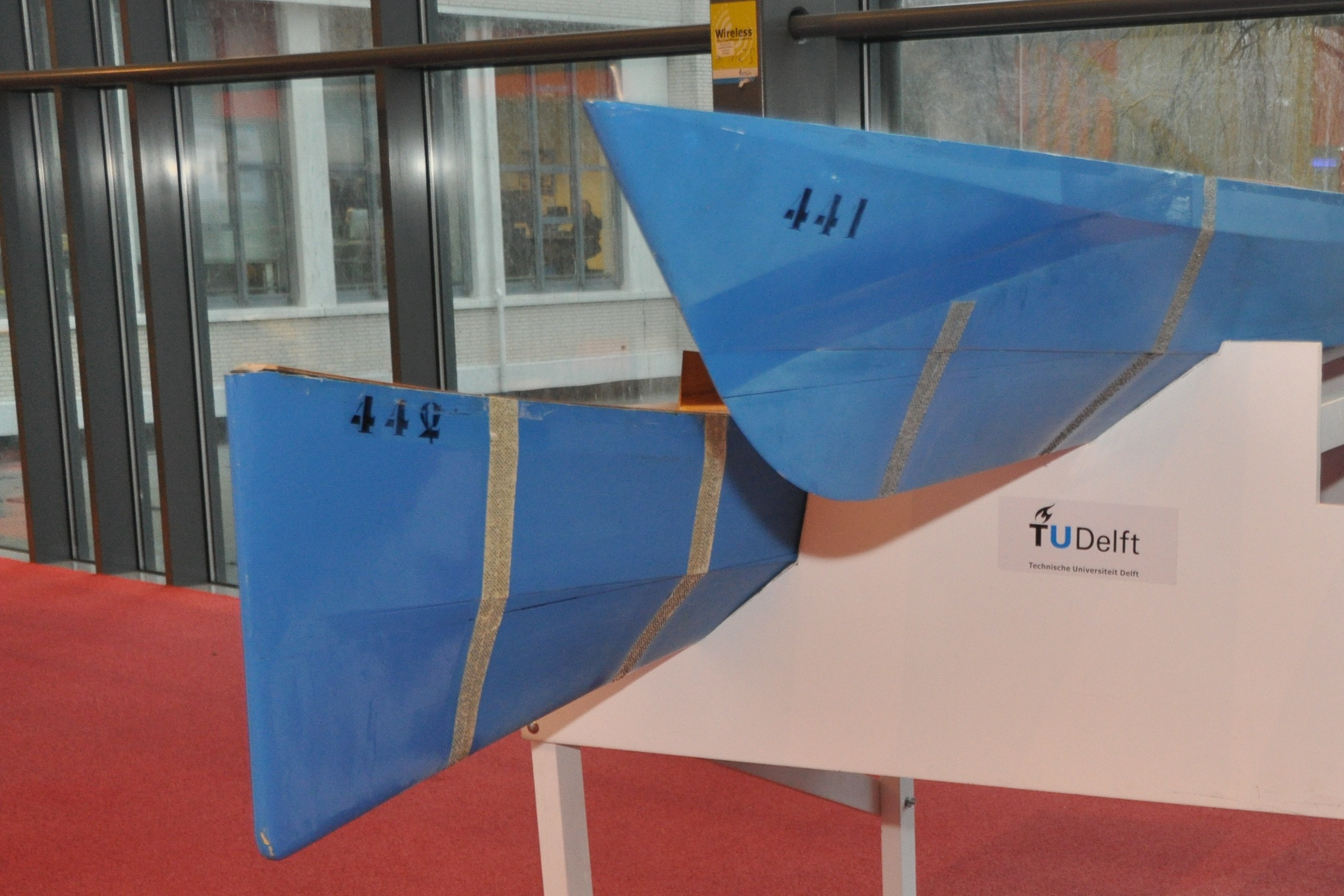
Comparison between an axe bow (442) and a conventional bow (441)

The axe bow is a wave-piercing type of ship's bow, characterised by a vertical stem and a relatively long and narrow entry (front hull). The forefoot is deep and the freeboard relatively high with little flare, so the bow profile resembles that of an axe. The bow is less affected by passing through waves than a bow with more flare, making this bow type much less susceptible to pitching. Because the deep forefoot does not generally rise above the water level, it is less susceptible to slamming. The axe bow moves the centre of lateral area forward and the vessel may need considerably more rudder motion to hold its course, an effect that increases with increasing wave steepness.

A vertical prow is not unique; they were common in the early steam era. The innovation of the axe bow is to combine the shape with a lengthened bow of the ship. This concept was developed in the Netherlands by Lex Keuning of Delft University of Technology, Damen Shipyards Group, Marin (Maritime Research Institute Netherlands), the Royal Netherlands Sea Rescue Institution, the Royal Netherlands Navy, Damen Schelde Naval Shipbuilding and the United States Coast Guard.

== Related energy saving bow designs ==
=== Ax-Bow ===
This is a bulbous bow with a wave-deflecting axe-shape at the top of the prow. It was developed by NKK of Japan, and first noted in the early 2000s. It offers an advantage of several percent in added resistance by incident waves over the ordinary bow shape.

=== LEADGE-bow ===
The LEADGE (or LEAding eDGE) bow is a non-bulbous bow that fills in between the bulb and the Ax to form a straight and vertical bow, slightly higher than normal prow to ensure wave deflection. It was first described by K, Hirota et al. in 2005. It offers an advantage of about 5% over the Ax-box and a further similar advantage over the ordinary bow with respect to incident wave resistance.

== See also ==
- Inverted bow – Bow whose furthest forward point is not at the top
