= Sámi Americans =

Americans of Sámi birth or descent

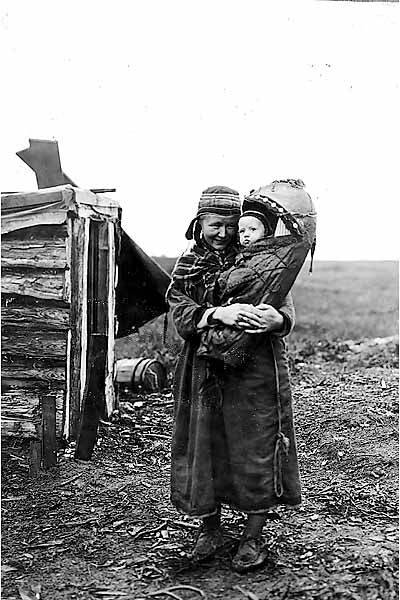
- Sámi reindeer herder Ellen Sara holding her baby sister Berit. Alaska, circa 1906.

Total population
- 945

Regions with significant populations
- Alaska · Midwest • California

Languages
- English · Sámi languages · Norwegian · Swedish · Finnish · Russian

Religion
- Christianity · Sámi shamanism

Sámi Americans are Americans of Sámi descent, who originate from Sápmi, the northern regions of Norway, Sweden, Finland, and the Kola Peninsula of Russia. The term Lapp Americans has been historically used, though lapp is considered derogatory by the Sámi.

Most Sámi emigrants came to the United States to escape ethnic discrimination, religious persecution, and/or poverty. The traditions and culture of these immigrants were further repressed by pressure to assimilate within Anglo-American society. As a result, very few Americans of Sámi descent are aware of their ancestry and many traditions have not been preserved outside of small communities. In 2000, a total of 945 American residents self-reported Sámi ancestry on their census. Although the actual number of Americans of Sámi descent is unknown, it is estimated that approximately 30,000 people of Sámi ancestry live in North America.

== Immigration ==
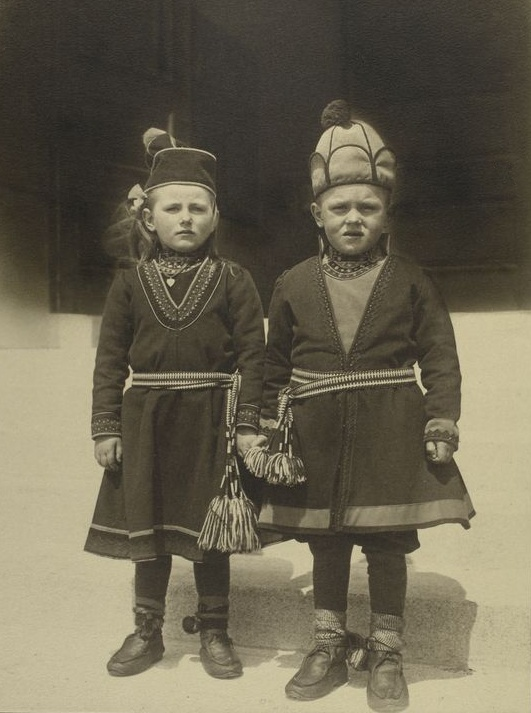
Sámi children photographed at Ellis Island by Augustus Frederick Sherman, c. 1910.

The majority of Sámi immigrants to the United States were documented based on their nationality, rather than their ethnicity. Ship manifests documenting the ethnic origins of their passengers to the United States often labeled Sámi migrants by their national origins, and when these migrants were processed on arrival to the United States, most were then marked as ethnically Norwegian, Finnish or Swedish. Because of this, it is unknown how many came to the U.S. during the late 19th and early 20th centuries along with other Scandinavian immigrants.

The majority of Sámi immigrants originated from Norway, Sweden, or Finland, though a small number came from the Kola Peninsula in Russia. Most came to the United States as single family units, which were often of mixed nationalities, where one spouse had a different Nordic nationality than the other. There is some speculation that some Sámi women who immigrated to the United States alone were mail-order brides, as oral histories record the efforts of women to avoid exploitative work.

The majority of Sámi migrants to the United States are believed to have immigrated from the late 19th to the early 20th century, like other Nordic American immigrants. The driving factors behind their emigration, however, appear to differ from other Nordic ethnicities. Though documentation of the phenomenon is limited, based on oral and written accounts by Sámi Americans it is believed that many Sámi were driven to emigrate because of discrimination and national claims to their territories. Many were also driven by religious factors, as Laestadians were persecuted in Sweden and Norway.

Initially, Sámi populations were drawn to the United States by employment opportunities in mining and logging industries. Sámi immigrants are first recorded to have arrived in the United States in the 1860s, when a number were recruited to work in the Keweenaw Peninsula copper mines. The majority of these miners were from northern Sweden and Finland. A community of Laestadians with Sámi origins later moved to the Peninsula as well. The most well documented case of Sámi immigration was to Alaska in the 1890s, when a comparatively small number of Sámi herders were recruited by the emerging Alaska Reindeer Service.

== Culture ==
In Sápmi, Sámi peoples were often discriminated against and increasingly subject to forced assimilation until the later 20th century. In the United States, however, most Americans were either unaware of the existence of Sámi as a distinct ethnicity or didn't distinguish them from other Nordic immigrants. Sámi Americans were and continue to be classified as White Americans by the United States government. However, within Nordic migrant communities they have faced discrimination against their culture and ethnicity. In order to avoid discrimination and conform to Anglo-American cultural norms, very few first-generation immigrants were open about their ethnicity. In many cases, Sámi immigrants actively repressed their ethnic identity. The traditions of these immigrants were quickly lost to later generations.

Much of the spread of Laestadianism in the Americas is attributed to Sámi-American immigrants who formed religious communities in the United States. Sámi immigrants, along with ethnic Finns, began founding their own congregations in the United States as early as the 1870s after an established Norwegian pastor denied a number of Laestadians the eucharist. The movement's founder, Lars Levi Laestadius, was a scholar of Sámi shamanism and had been principally concerned with preaching to Sámi populations. Although Laestadianism has since spread beyond Sámi populations, it is still closely associated with Sámi heritage because of its origins.

A movement in the late 20th century which sought to revive Sámi identity in North America yielded two publications which aim to connect Sámi Americans to their past: Árran and Báiki. The Sami Siida of North America was also formed as a network connecting Sámi descendants in North America. These organizations have made efforts to reconnect with surviving Sámi populations in northern Scandinavia, and to revive traditional Sámi art forms, such as storytelling.

== Sámi in Alaska ==
In the mid 19th century, the United States government began efforts to teach reindeer husbandry to Alaska Natives as their traditional sources of sustenance through seal, walrus, and whale hunting had become insufficient due to overfishing. Initially Chukchi herders were brought over, but animosity between the Chukchi and the Alaskan Iñupiat made their working relationship unviable. Instead, the Sámi were encouraged to emigrate to Alaska at the invitation of the Alaskan Commissioner of Education, Sheldon Jackson. As the Commissioner of Education, Jackson also introduced policies which effectively sought to re-educate the Alaska native population and repress cultural differences. With the advent of a significant Sámi population in his jurisdiction, these repressive policies came to apply to Sámi immigrants as well.

At the time, many Sámi herders in Sápmi had lost their traditional livelihoods, as they had been gradually pushed out of lands used for nomadic pastoralism into more defined regions with inflexible borders. This likely encouraged some to make the arduous journey to Alaska. The first group of herders made the three-month journey in 1894, from Finnmarksvidda, across North America, to Teller Reindeer Station. According to The New York Times, there were only sixteen in the group, and they were under a three-year contract for $27.50 per month plus boarding. By the turn of the 20th century, many of these first families returned to Sápmi after their contracts expired. Some, however, remained in Alaska and continued herding reindeer.

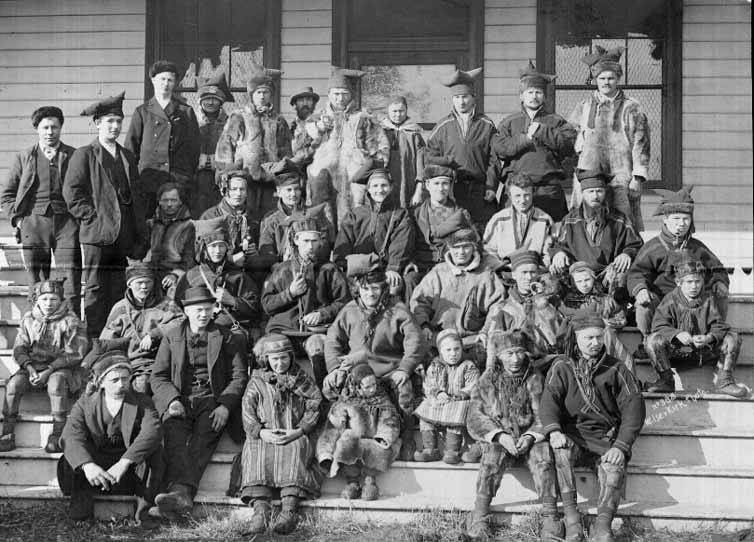
Sámi reindeer herders of the Lapland-Yukon Relief Expedition, 1898, Seattle.

The government was once again forced to find new forms of food in Alaska, after the discovery of gold and the Klondike Gold Rush brought more people to the region than the already strained and sparse infrastructure could sustain. Sheldon Jackson once again recruited more Sámi to immigrate to Alaska, this time in greater numbers. In February 1898, a group of 87 Sámi headers and their families embarked for Alaska. With them, they brought 537 reindeer, 4000 sacks of moss feed, and 418 reindeer pulks. By the time the arrived in Seattle, however, the U.S. government had decided that the situation in Alaska was not dire enough to warrant immediate action, and had reallocated all of its ships to fighting in the Spanish–American War. The group was forced to wait in Seattle until ships were made available for their journey north. By the time the expedition arrived in Alaska in April, reportedly only 200 of the 537 reindeer had survived the long trip. This group was contracted for a two-year period, after which 26 returned to Sápmi. Many of those who remained in North America stayed in Alaska as miners, while others resettled in Washington and the Midwest, where large Scandinavian populations existed. Samuel Balto, a Sámi explorer who had temporarily moved to Alaska during this era, sent a letter detailing his experience to Fridtjof Nansen, which read in part,

...We came to Alaska July 27, 1898. [...] We travelled seven miles upriver where we built seven houses and a big three-story farmhouse. [...] Up to the time when we started building, we received, according to our contract, "good and sufficient" food. In November the Superintendent began to sell our provisions to the Eskimos, and he put the money in his own pocket. For us [Sami] there was less and less each month. Finally there was hunger among us and many came down with scurvy. Now we are all free men, having left government service. We have travelled 200 miles westward from the station to the place where there have been many gold finds, Anvil City [Nome].

— Samuel Balto, Letter to Fridtjof Nansen (translated from Norwegian),
Anvil City, Alaska, 9 September 1899

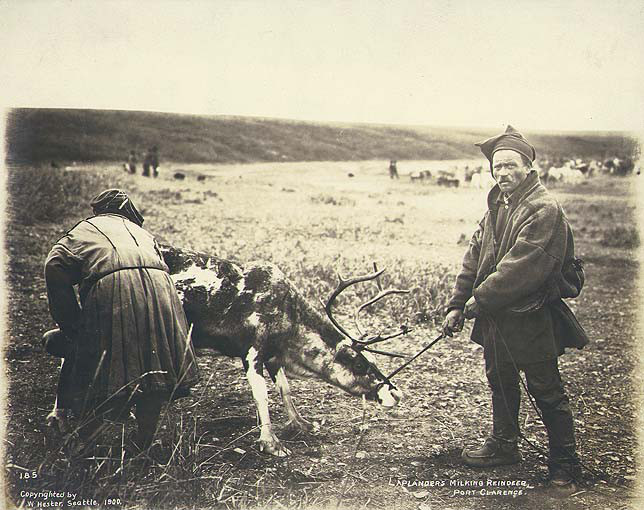
Sámi milking reindeer, Port Clarence, Alaska, 1900

In 1937, Sámi and all other non-Native Alaskans were banned from owning reindeer through The Reindeer Act. The act was passed by the U.S. Congress and signed into law by President Franklin D. Roosevelt on September 1 of that year. It effectively prohibited the ownership of reindeer herds in Alaska by non-Native Americans and was intended to provide for Alaskan natives and to allow them to establish a self-sustaining industry. Authority to promulgate rules regarding the ownership and maintenance of reindeer herds was delegated to the Bureau of Indian Affairs via the Secretary of the Interior, who banned most transactions to non-natives. The act was modeled in part on Norwegian and Swedish policies on the ownership of reindeer by the Sámi of Sápmi. Many Sámi had recently arrived in Alaska to manage the reindeer in the 1930s. As a result of the act, Alaskan Sámi were required to sell their herds to the government at $3 per head. Many left Alaska after doing so, in search of new ways to support themselves. While many became scattered across North America and forced to integrate, a significant number settled on the Kitsap peninsula in Washington, where a community of Norwegian immigrants already existed.

== Notable people ==
- Samuel Balto, explorer

== See also ==
- Sámi people
- Sámi history
- Nordic and Scandinavian Americans
- Finnish Americans
  - Findians
