= Teller, Alaska =

Teller Tala / Iġaluŋniaġvik (Inupiaq)
- City
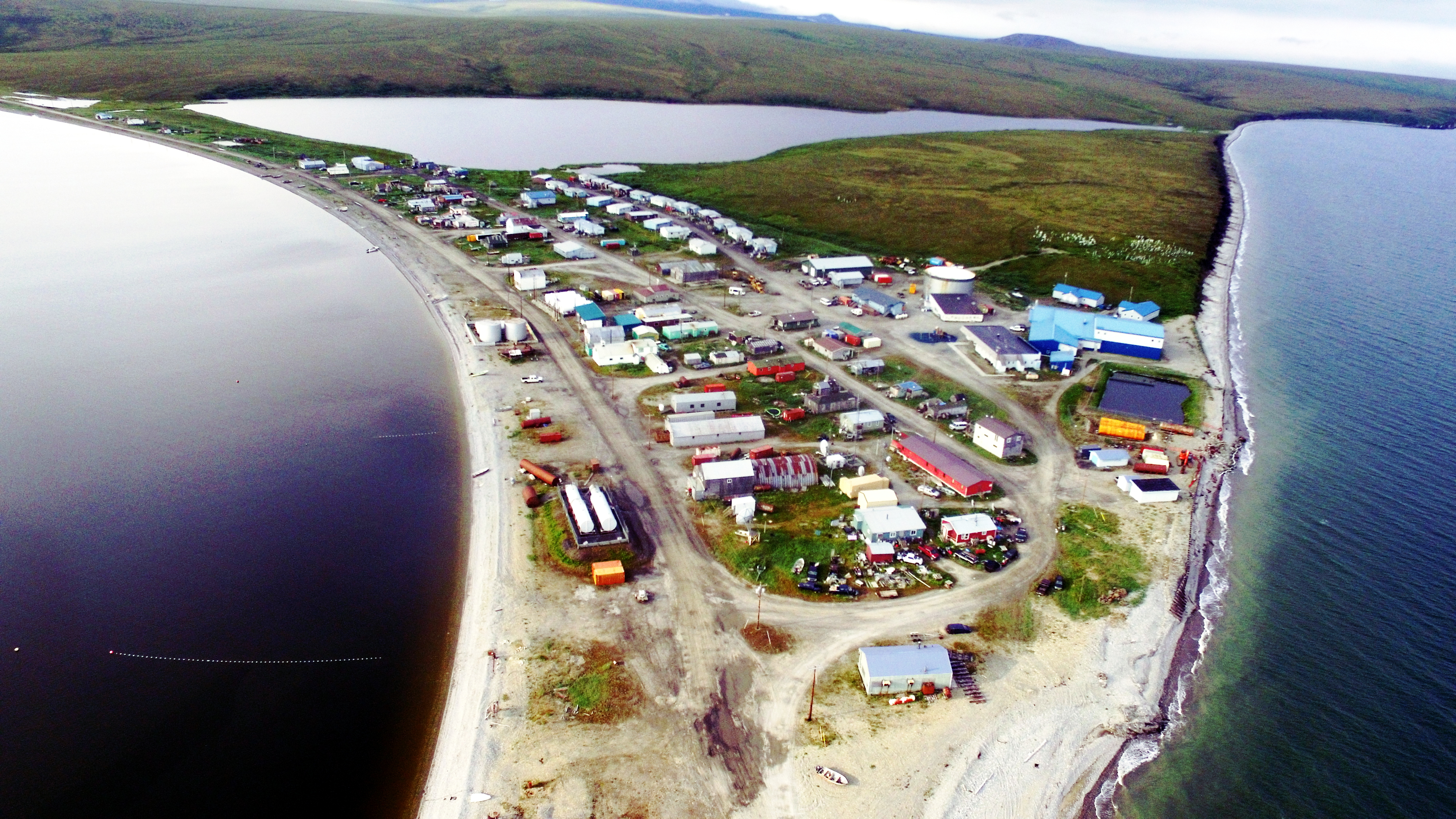
- Teller Townsite July 2023

- Location in Alaska
- Coordinates: 65°15′26″N 166°21′14″W
- Country: United States
- State: Alaska
- Census area: Nome
- Incorporated: October 10, 1963

Government
  - Mayor: Blanche Okbaok-Garnie
  - State senator: Donny Olson (D)
  - State rep.: Neal Foster (D)

Area
  - Total: 1.68 sq mi (4.35 km^{2})
  - Land: 1.49 sq mi (3.87 km^{2})
  - Water: 0.19 sq mi (0.49 km^{2})
- Elevation: 0 ft (0 m)

Population (2020)
  - Total: 249
  - Density: 166.8/sq mi (64.42/km^{2})
- Time zone: UTC-9 (Alaska (AKST))
  - Summer (DST): UTC-8 (AKDT)
- ZIP code: 99778
- Area code: 907
- FIPS code: 02-75930
- GNIS feature ID: 1410730

Teller (Inupiaq: Tala, Tupqaġruk, or Iġaluŋniaġvik) is a city in the Nome Census Area, Alaska, United States. As of the 2020 census, Teller had a population of 249.

It is situated on the southern half of the spit called Nuuk in Inupiaq, which separates Port Clarence Bay (see also Port Clarence, Alaska) and Grantley Harbor, at the outlet of the Imuruk Basin.

== History ==
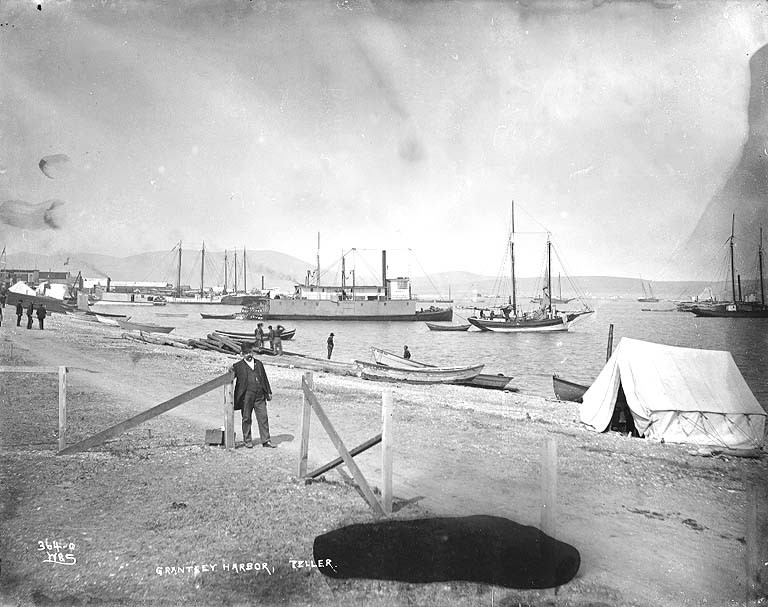
Beach near Teller, Alaska, circa 1901

The Inupiat had a fishing camp called Nuuk 32 km (20 mi) south of Teller in the early 19th century. The 1825-28 Beechey expedition found three camps with a total of some 400 inhabitants and a winter camp site with burial grounds in a roughly 10-mile (16 km) radius around the later site of Teller on September 1, 1827.

An expedition from the Western Union telegraph spent the winter at the present site of Teller in 1866 and 1867; they called it Libbyville or Libby Station. When the United States Government introduced reindeer herding in Alaska, the Teller Reindeer Station operated from 1892 to 1900 at a nearby site. A group of experienced Sami reindeer herders and families were brought in to train the Inupiat. The station was named for United States Senator and Secretary of the Interior Henry Moore Teller in 1892 by Sheldon Jackson.

Teller was established in 1900 after the Bluestone Placer Mine discovery 25 km (16 mi) to the south. It took its name from the reindeer herding station. During the boom years in the early 20th century, Teller had a population of about 5,000 and was a major regional trading center. Natives from Diomede, Wales, Mary's Igloo, and King Island came to trade there.

The Norwegian Evangelical Lutheran Church built Teller Mission across the harbor from Teller in 1900. The mission was renamed Brevig Mission in 1903, after the Reverend T.L. Brevig, who also served briefly as Teller's first postmaster, a post to which he was appointed April 2, 1900.

The dirigible Norge detoured to Teller on its first flight over the North Pole from Norway to Nome in 1926. Many present residents of Teller came from Mary's Igloo. Mary's Igloo is now a summer fishing camp and has no permanent residents.

Today, Teller is an Inupiat village that depends on subsistence hunting and fishing.

== Geography ==
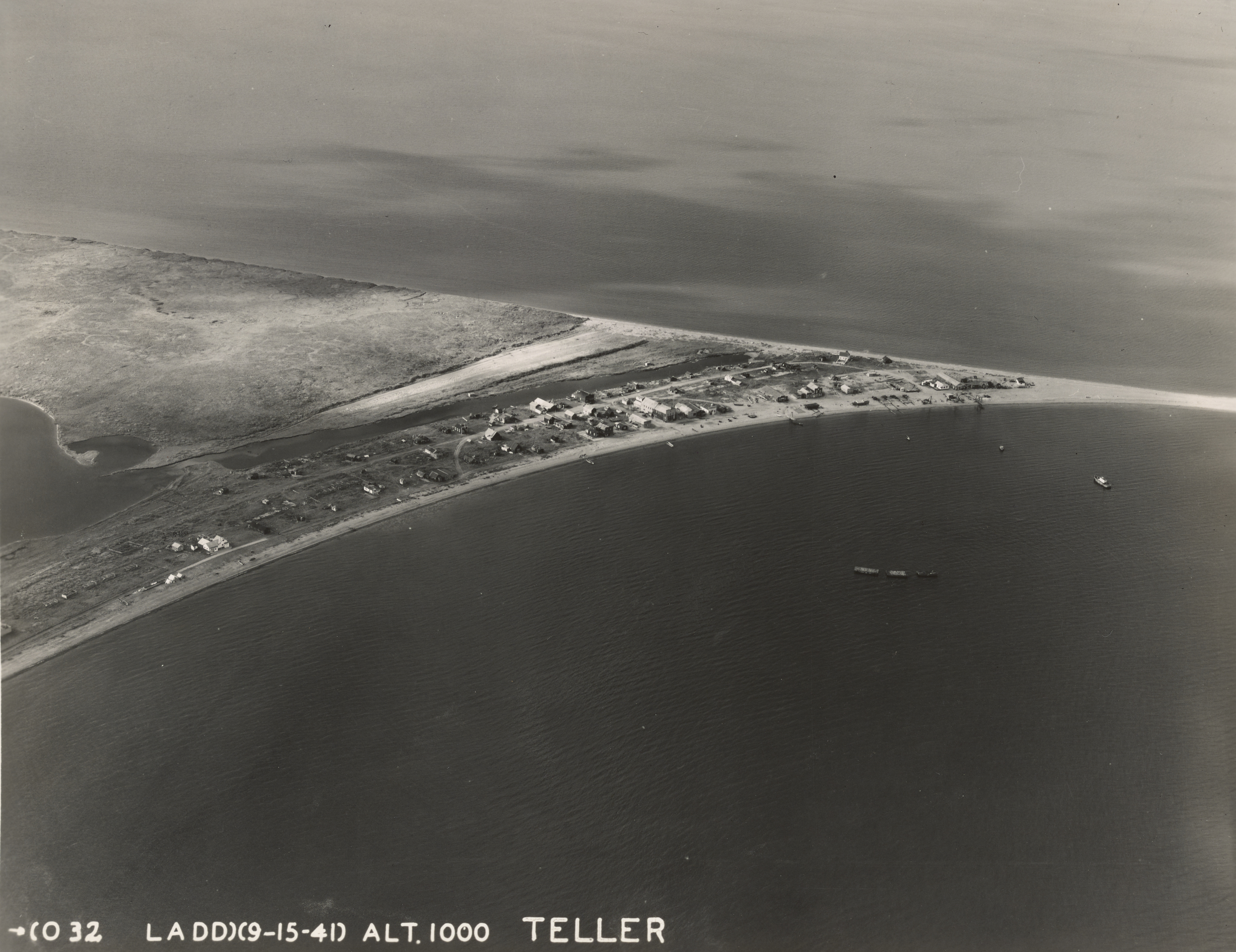
Teller in 1941

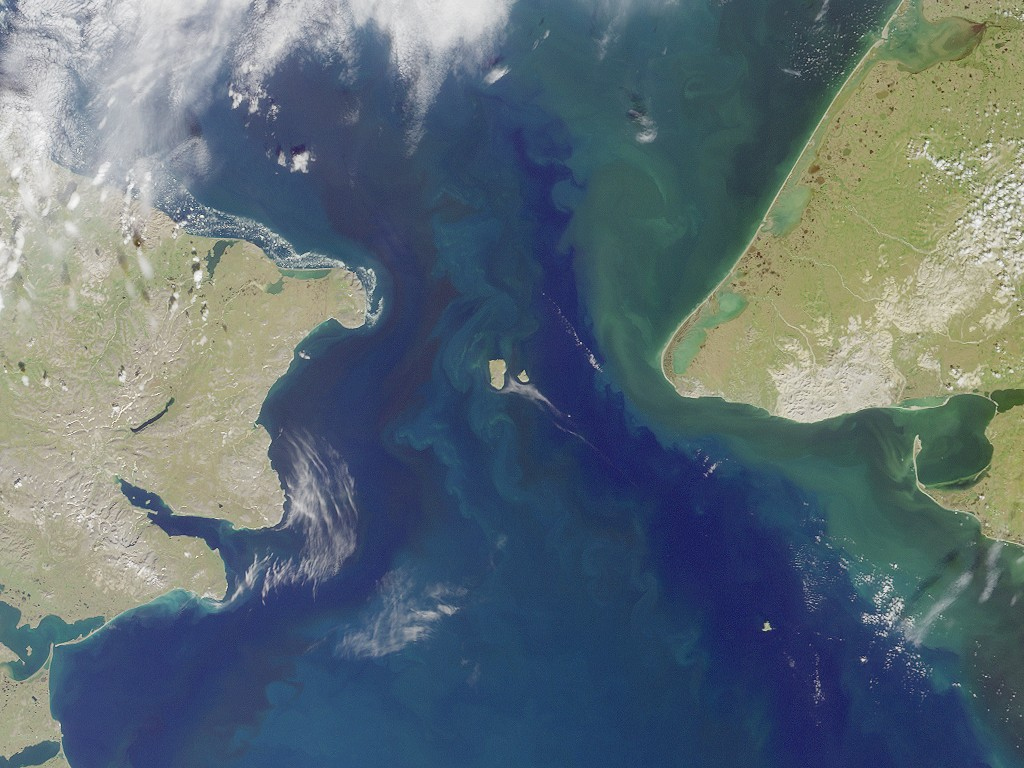
A satellite image of the Bering Strait. Port Clarence Bay is the large bight in the southeast; Grantley Harbor extends inland to the east of it.

Teller is located on a spit 116 km (72 mi) northwest of Nome on the Seward Peninsula.

According to the United States Census Bureau, the city has a total area of 2.1 square miles (5.4 km^{2}), of which 1.9 square miles (4.9 km^{2}) is land and 0.2 square miles (0.52 km^{2}) (9.00%) is water.

=== Climate ===
Teller has a continental subarctic climate (Köppen: Dfc), although its climate nearly qualifies as a tundra climate (Köppen: ETs).

== Climate change ==
All of Teller's public and commercial buildings and two-thirds of Teller's occupied homes are at the Townsite, a low-lying sand spit that is surrounded on three sides by water. Since the turn of the century damaging storms have been coming more often, the storms have been getting bigger, and the flooding has been getting worse. Teller has been forced to relocate its airport and landfill four miles uphill over the past three decades to escape intense erosion. In September 2005, all infrastructure on the spit, including the school, power plant, clinic, and homes, were impacted by flooding. Storms in 2009 and 2011 washed out the remaining portion of Teller's seawall, breached the school's sewage lagoon and flooded downtown streets with knee-deep flood waters contaminated with human waste.

Climate data for Teller
| Month | Jan | Feb | Mar | Apr | May | Jun | Jul | Aug | Sep | Oct | Nov | Dec | Year |
|---|---|---|---|---|---|---|---|---|---|---|---|---|---|
| Record high °F | 47 | 39 | 45 | 48 | 62 | 82 | 79 | 76 | 61 | 53 | 41 | 36 | 82 |
| Mean maximum °F | 33.8 | 32.5 | 33.4 | 40.8 | 53.1 | 68.7 | 70.4 | 68.1 | 56.3 | 46.3 | 37.3 | 30.8 | 72.5 |
| Mean daily maximum °F | 10.2 | 5.7 | 10.3 | 24.0 | 40.9 | 52.1 | 57.5 | 56.0 | 47.3 | 33.0 | 21.2 | 6.9 | 30.4 |
| Daily mean °F | 2.6 | −1.0 | 1.7 | 14.4 | 33.5 | 44.9 | 51.3 | 50.5 | 42.0 | 29.0 | 17.8 | 0.7 | 23.9 |
| Mean daily minimum °F | −4.4 | −8.0 | −6.9 | 5.2 | 26.2 | 37.9 | 45.1 | 44.9 | 36.9 | 24.6 | 12.6 | −5.2 | 17.4 |
| Mean minimum °F | −28.6 | −28.9 | −28.0 | −11.1 | 7.6 | 27.0 | 36.7 | 36.3 | 27.2 | 11.4 | −9.6 | −22.6 | −31.5 |
| Record low °F | −38 | −45 | −40 | −32 | −17 | 12 | 25 | 27 | 20 | −10 | −30 | −36 | −45 |
| Average precipitation inches | 0.80 | 0.73 | 0.83 | 0.41 | 0.33 | 0.47 | 0.92 | 2.42 | 1.08 | 0.60 | 0.64 | 0.49 | 9.73 |
| Average snowfall inches | 6.9 | 7.1 | 11.1 | 4.6 | 1.8 | 0.1 | 0.0 | 0.0 | 0.3 | 1.5 | 6.6 | 6.1 | 46.2 |
| Record high °C | 8 | 4 | 7 | 9 | 17 | 28 | 26 | 24 | 16 | 12 | 5 | 2 | 28 |
| Mean daily maximum °C | −12.1 | −14.6 | −12.1 | −4.4 | 4.9 | 11.2 | 14.2 | 13.3 | 8.5 | 0.6 | −6.0 | −13.9 | −0.9 |
| Daily mean °C | −16.3 | −18.3 | −16.8 | −9.8 | 0.8 | 7.2 | 10.7 | 10.3 | 5.6 | −1.7 | −7.9 | −17.4 | −4.5 |
| Mean daily minimum °C | −20.2 | −22.2 | −21.6 | −14.9 | −3.2 | 3.3 | 7.3 | 7.2 | 2.7 | −4.1 | −10.8 | −20.7 | −8.1 |
| Record low °C | −39 | −43 | −40 | −36 | −27 | −11 | −4 | −3 | −7 | −23 | −34 | −38 | −43 |
| Average precipitation mm | 20 | 19 | 21 | 10 | 8.4 | 12 | 23 | 61 | 27 | 15 | 16 | 12 | 247 |
| Average snowfall cm | 18 | 18 | 28 | 12 | 4.6 | 0.25 | 0.0 | 0.0 | 0.76 | 3.8 | 17 | 15 | 117 |
| Average precipitation days | 5 | 5 | 4 | 4 | 3 | 5 | 8 | 13 | 9 | 6 | 8 | 6 | 76 |
Source: WRCC

== Demographics ==
Historical population
| Census | Pop. | Note | %± |
|---|---|---|---|
| 1910 | 125 | | — |
| 1920 | 80 | | −36.0% |
| 1930 | 76 | | −5.0% |
| 1940 | 118 | | 55.3% |
| 1950 | 160 | | 35.6% |
| 1960 | 217 | | 35.6% |
| 1970 | 220 | | 1.4% |
| 1980 | 212 | | −3.6% |
| 1990 | 151 | | −28.8% |
| 2000 | 268 | | 77.5% |
| 2010 | 229 | | −14.6% |
| 2020 | 249 | | 8.7% |
U.S. Decennial Census

Teller first appeared on the 1910 U.S. Census as an unincorporated village. The census bureau erroneously reported the name as Fuller. It reported correctly as Teller since 1920. It was formally incorporated in 1963.

=== 2020 census ===
As of the 2020 census, Teller had a population of 249. The median age was 26.3 years. 40.2% of residents were under the age of 18 and 4.8% of residents were 65 years of age or older. For every 100 females there were 120.4 males, and for every 100 females age 18 and over there were 119.1 males age 18 and over.

0.0% of residents lived in urban areas, while 100.0% lived in rural areas.

There were 73 households in Teller, of which 41.1% had children under the age of 18 living in them. Of all households, 30.1% were married-couple households, 31.5% were households with a male householder and no spouse or partner present, and 21.9% were households with a female householder and no spouse or partner present. About 30.1% of all households were made up of individuals and 11.0% had someone living alone who was 65 years of age or older.

There were 84 housing units, of which 13.1% were vacant. The homeowner vacancy rate was 2.5% and the rental vacancy rate was 10.5%.

Racial composition as of the 2020 census
| Race | Number | Percent |
|---|---|---|
| White | 9 | 3.6% |
| Black or African American | 0 | 0.0% |
| American Indian and Alaska Native | 224 | 90.0% |
| Asian | 5 | 2.0% |
| Native Hawaiian and Other Pacific Islander | 0 | 0.0% |
| Some other race | 0 | 0.0% |
| Two or more races | 11 | 4.4% |
| Hispanic or Latino (of any race) | 2 | 0.8% |

=== 2000 census ===
As of the 2000 census, there were 268 people, 76 households, and 61 families residing in the city. The population density was 139.9 inhabitants per square mile (54.0/km^{2}). There were 87 housing units at an average density of 45.4 per square mile (17.5/km^{2}). The racial makeup of the city was 7.46% White and 92.54% Native American. 0.37% of the population were Hispanic or Latino of any race.

Of the 76 households, 53.9% had children under the age of 18 living with them, 36.8% were married couples living together, 15.8% had a female householder with no husband present, and 19.7% were non-families. 18.4% of all households were made up of individuals, and 5.3% had someone living alone who was 65 years of age or older. The average household size was 3.53 and the average family size was 3.80.

In the city, the age distribution of the population shows 41.4% under the age of 18, 9.7% from 18 to 24, 26.5% from 25 to 44, 15.7% from 45 to 64, and 6.7% who were 65 years of age or older. The median age was 24 years. For every 100 females, there were 135.1 males. For every 100 females age 18 and over, there were 134.3 males.

The median income for a household in the city was $23,000, and the median income for a family was $20,000. Males had a median income of $25,625 versus $31,250 for females. The per capita income for the city was $8,617. About 33.9% of families and 37.7% of the population were below the poverty line, including 45.0% of those under the age of 18 and 27.8% of those 65 or over.

== Education ==
Teller is served by the Bering Strait School District. James C. Isabell School serves grades Pre-K through 12.

== Notable person ==
- Libby Riddles (born 1956), dog musher, author
