= Grantley Harbor =

Waterway in Alaska

Coordinates: 65°16′16″N 166°12′2″W

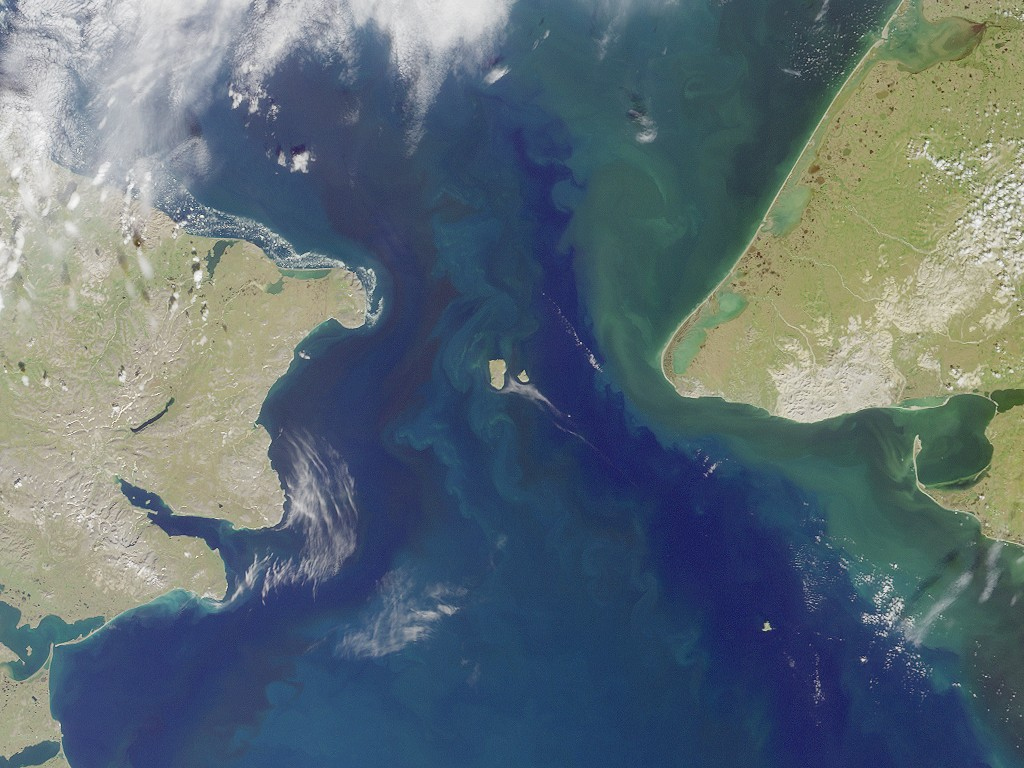
A satellite image of the Bering Strait. Port Clarence Bay is the large bight in the southeast; Grantley Harbor extends inland to the east of it.

Grantley Harbor (native name, Kaviak) is a waterway located at the bay of Port Clarence, Alaska, on the Seward Peninsula in the U.S. state of Alaska. The inner harbor at the entrance to the northeast corner of the bay was named after Lord Grantley.

== History ==
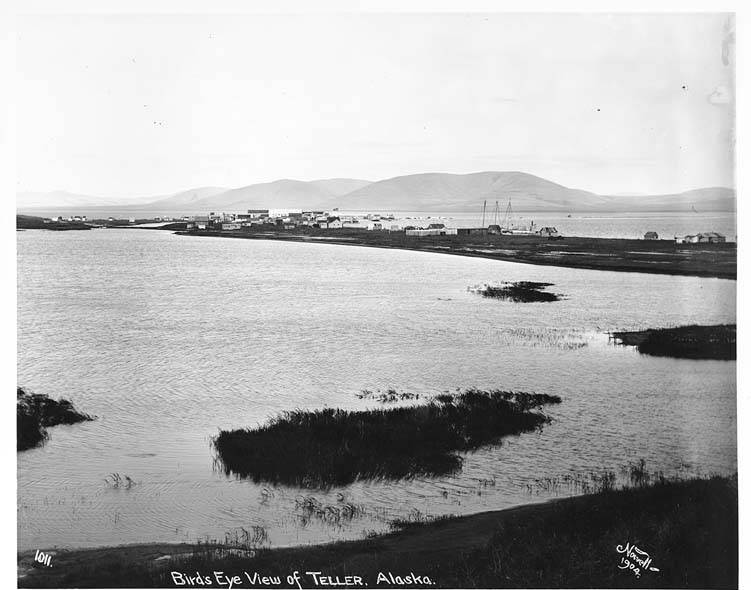
Teller located on a spit between Port Clarence and Grantley Harbor

The area between Grantley Harbor, Port Clarence and Golovnin Bay was inhabited by the Kaveahrachamutes. The regional headquarters of the Russo-American Telegraph Expedition of 1865–67 were located on Grantley Harbor, while the headquarters of Teller Reindeer Station were established nearby in 1892 by Sheldon Jackson.

The town of Teller on Grantley Harbor was inhabited by prospectors during the Nome Gold Rush.

== Geography ==
Grantley is an inner harbor, opening into the northeast corner of the bay of Port Clarence. The sand pits at the opening of the bay are named Points Spencer and Jackson after the officers of the Navy. It is a marshy and low land with many lakes. Point Spencer, the extremity of the low sand spit which extends 10 miles (16 km) from the coast, forms the south and west sides of the harbor. At the extreme eastern end of the bay are two narrow sand spits, extending from the northern and southern shores, which enclose Grantley Harbor. The harbor's entrance is about 0.33 miles (0.53 km) in width, 9 miles (14 km) from east to west, and 3 miles (4.8 km) from north to south. At the extreme eastern end of Grantley Harbor is a second strait, about 900 feet (270 m) wide, which connects with a third body of water, Imourouk Lake. To the north of Grantley Harbor, Muck-a-Charlie Peak rises to a 1,600 feet (490 m) peak. On its eastern side, the harbor connect with a channel of water 3–4 miles (4.8–6.4 km) long which passes hills measuring at least 100 feet (30 m) in height on each side. The Agiapuk River flows parallel with Grantley Harbor for about 20 miles (32 km), separated by an upland. The settlement of Nook was at one time situated on the south side of the harbor's mouth. The depth of water in the bay is adequate for ships to ply.

The Bluestone River gold mining region is situated south of the harbor. Several streams empty into the harbor, including Coyote, Dese, and Sunset creeks. Moss-covered lowland of Sunest Creek borders Grantley Harbor. Iglook Creek enters the harbor east of Sunset Creek. The short streams which flow into the harbor are of 2–3 miles length of which two are from the southern end and four from the northern side. Their origin is in the Mountain Mokacharni and flows through a dissected plateau forming the upland.

== Geology ==
Geological formation in harbor area consists of Nome series bed rocks, folded graphite slates with some amount coal veins in the valleys of the creeks that flow into the harbor. A study of the geological map of the region shows extensive greenstone at the eastern part of the bay which is inferred as an intrusive in limestone formations that are placed below the slate formation. Limestone formations are noted in the northern stream that flow into the harbor and to the west of the harbor (Reindeer Station) Ordovician fossils are found in the limestone formations. The northern shore of the harbor has bed rock formations of mica-schist and greenstone. The Mukhacharni Mountain and its two adjoining mountains have basaltic rock formations of volcanic origin of pre-Pleistocene age.

== Minerals ==
Gold was found in 1900 in three of the creeks that flow into the harbour when stakes have been claimed. These formations carry mineralized quartz. Gold has been extracted from Sunset Creek (5 miles long) and Igloo Creek also.

== Aquafauna ==
Fish species of Pacific sandlance (Ammodytes personatus) is found in fairly large number in the harbor. They feed on crustaceans, barnacle larve, copepods, and chaetognaths. They in turn are the food chain and form the feed source for marine mammals, birds and other species of fish. Seals are spotted, ringed, and bearded species; spotted is seen when the sea is calm (seals and seal oil form the staple diet of the people who live on the shores of the harbor in towns like Teller). Herring, whitefish, starry flounder, pike and tomcod are netted during spring, fall and midsummer. All five salmon species are found here of which red salmon is the primary catch and they migrate inland to the Salmon Lake to breed. Chum salmon migrate to the Pilgrim River and Agiapuk River. King salmon are rare.

== Avifauna ==
Bird species recorded in the harbor are Pelagic cormorant, pigeon guillemot, horned puffin, common eider, black scoter, Arctic terns, glaucous gulls and White wagtails.
