= Bluestone River (Alaska) =

- Location of the mouth of the Bluestone River in Alaska

Location
- Country: United States
- State: Alaska
- District: Nome Census Area

Physical characteristics
- Source: Confluence of Gold Run and Right Fork Bluestone River
  - location: Seward Peninsula
  - coordinates: 65°05′19″N 166°13′11″W
  - elevation: 219 ft (67 m)
- Mouth: Tuksuk Channel
  - location: 12 miles (19 km) southeast of Teller
  - coordinates: 65°11′11″N 166°01′18″W
  - elevation: 0 ft (0 m)
- Length: 13 mi (21 km)

Bluestone River is a waterway located on the Seward Peninsula in the U.S. state of Alaska. A tributary of the Tuksuk Channel from the south, Bluestone is a north-flowing stream situated 11 miles (18 km) southeast of Teller. It was named in 1900 by Edward Chester Barnard, topographer of the United States Geological Survey.

== History ==
After gold was discovered in the early summer of 1900, mining operations commenced. Gold was mined on Gold Run, Alder Creek (a Gold Run tributary), and on Bering Creek (a Right Fork tributary), while the Bluestone Placer Mine was established 15 miles (24 km) south of the U.S. government's Teller Reindeer Station, which had been in operation for about eight years. Settlements sprung up near and on Port Clarence, the larger being Teller, which, by autumn 1900, had a post office and a population of about 1,000. The Bluestone placer mines were located about 18 miles (29 km) from Teller with the trail between the two characterized as uphill, covered with moss, and "very poor walking for both man and beast". A second settlement on Port Clarence, Bering City, afforded ships closer proximity to the shore and was only 12 miles (19 km) from the Bluestone mines, but had only a fifth of the population of Teller, which was 5 miles (8.0 km) to the north.

Placer mining operations have been noted at several locations in the river since 1969.

== Geography ==
The headwaters of the Bluestone River form in a valley, where it drains the region between Grantley Harbor and the Bering Sea, an area known as the Bluestone region. The drainage is situated between the Kigluaik Mountains and Port Clarence. The area contains flat-topped hills. For about 10 miles (16 km) above the river's mouth, Bluestone traverses a rolling plateau with an elevation of 400–600 feet (120–180 m). Here, the river valley is characterized as being broad, with flood plains measuring at least 0.5 miles (0.80 km) in width. Above this section of the river the valley contains a steep-walled canyon noting flat-topped mountains 1,200 feet (370 m) in height. The river's average gradient measures approximately 30 feet (9.1 m) per mile. Where the river valley broadens, it forks instead of expanding into a broad flood plain. The eastern branch, Gold Run, measures approximately 20 miles (32 km) in length (has the settlement at Sulivan) and has a crooked course, traveling northwest before turning east–west; Alder Creek is an eastern tributary (short length of 2 miles (3.2 km)). The western split is known as Right Fork. It, too, follows a crooked course, traveling westward before turning to the east at the junction with Gold Run; Right Fork also has several tributaries.

== Geology ==
The geological formations recorded in the river basin consist generally of a metapelitic sequence. Mafic intrusives have been noted in the locally metamorphosed zones. The Bluestone basin features mica and chlorite schists, beds of limestone, intrusive mafic masses altered to greenstone, and small quartz veins, particularly in the Gold Run Creek, a southern and eastern tributary of the Bluestone River. In some areas, minerals recorded are blueschist facies and retrograde greenschist facies. The geological age of these formations is conjectured as Paleozoic. Gold found on benches and in the main drainage was reported to be fine grained material and some nuggets were also recovered. The gold–bearing gravels were found to have cinnabar and platinum-group metals. Gold was also found in a tributary mining location on Skookum Creek.

== See also ==
- List of rivers of Alaska
