= Reindeer Station =

Uninhabited locality in Northwest Territories, Canada

Reindeer Station Qunngilaaq
- Locality
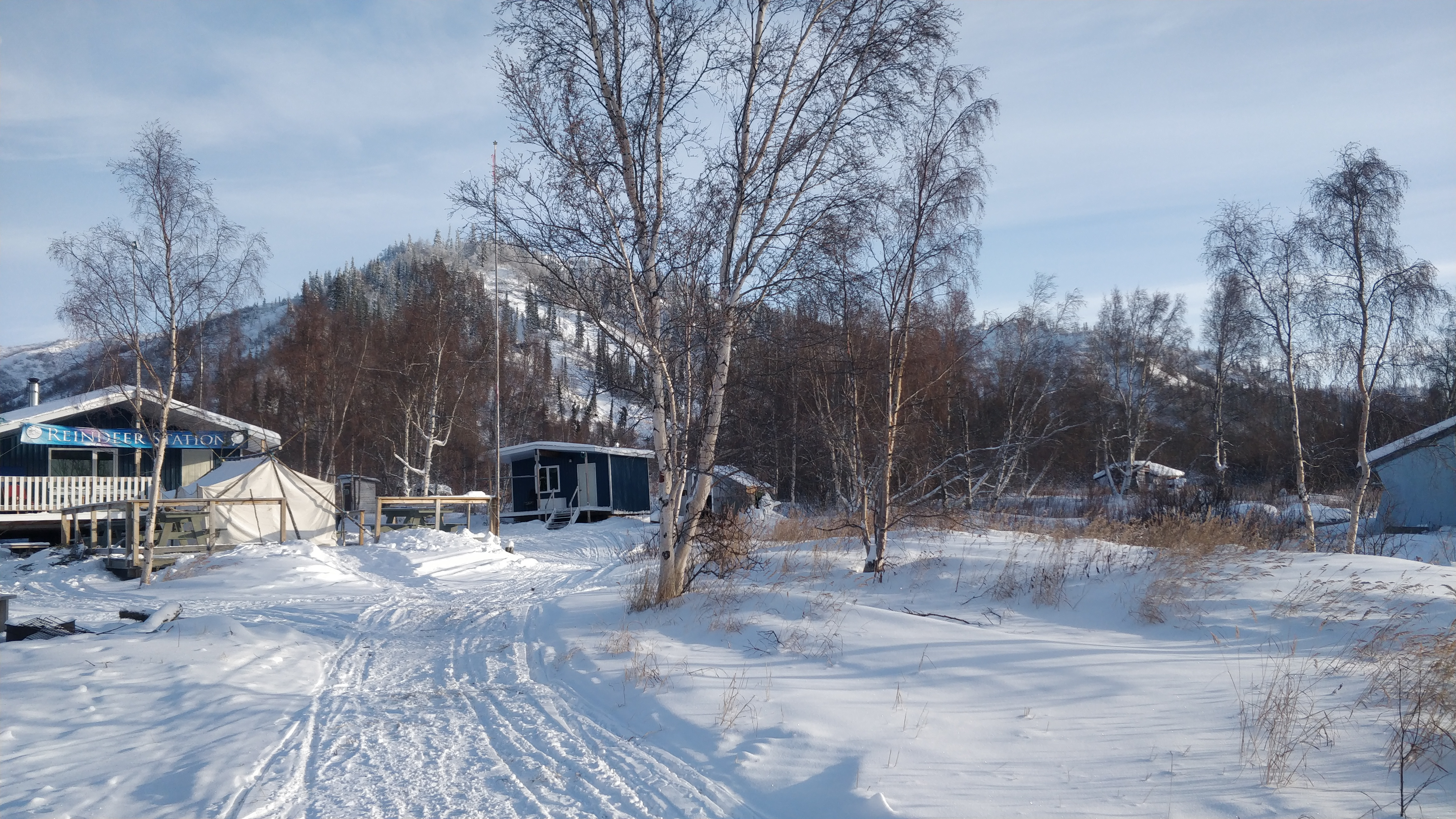
- Modern buildings at Reindeer Station

- Location in the Northwest Territories Reindeer Station (Canada)
- Coordinates: 68°41′20″N 134°08′06″W
- Country: Canada
- Territory: Northwest Territories
- Region: Inuvik
- Founded: 1932

Population (1950s)
  - Total: 90
- Time zone: UTC−06:00 (Northwest Territories Time)

Reindeer Station (known as Qunngilaaq in the Inuvialuktun language) is an uninhabited locality in the Northwest Territories, Canada. It is located in the Caribou Hills, along the Mackenzie River's eastern channel. The community was established in 1932 to house a herd of 3,442 reindeer purchased by the Government of Canada. The venture was intended to replace the traditional livelihood of the local Indigenous peoples, but few chose to become reindeer herders, so the government eventually sold the animals. Reindeer Station was abandoned in 1969. Most of its residential buildings were relocated to the larger centres of Tuktoyaktuk and Inuvik.

== History ==
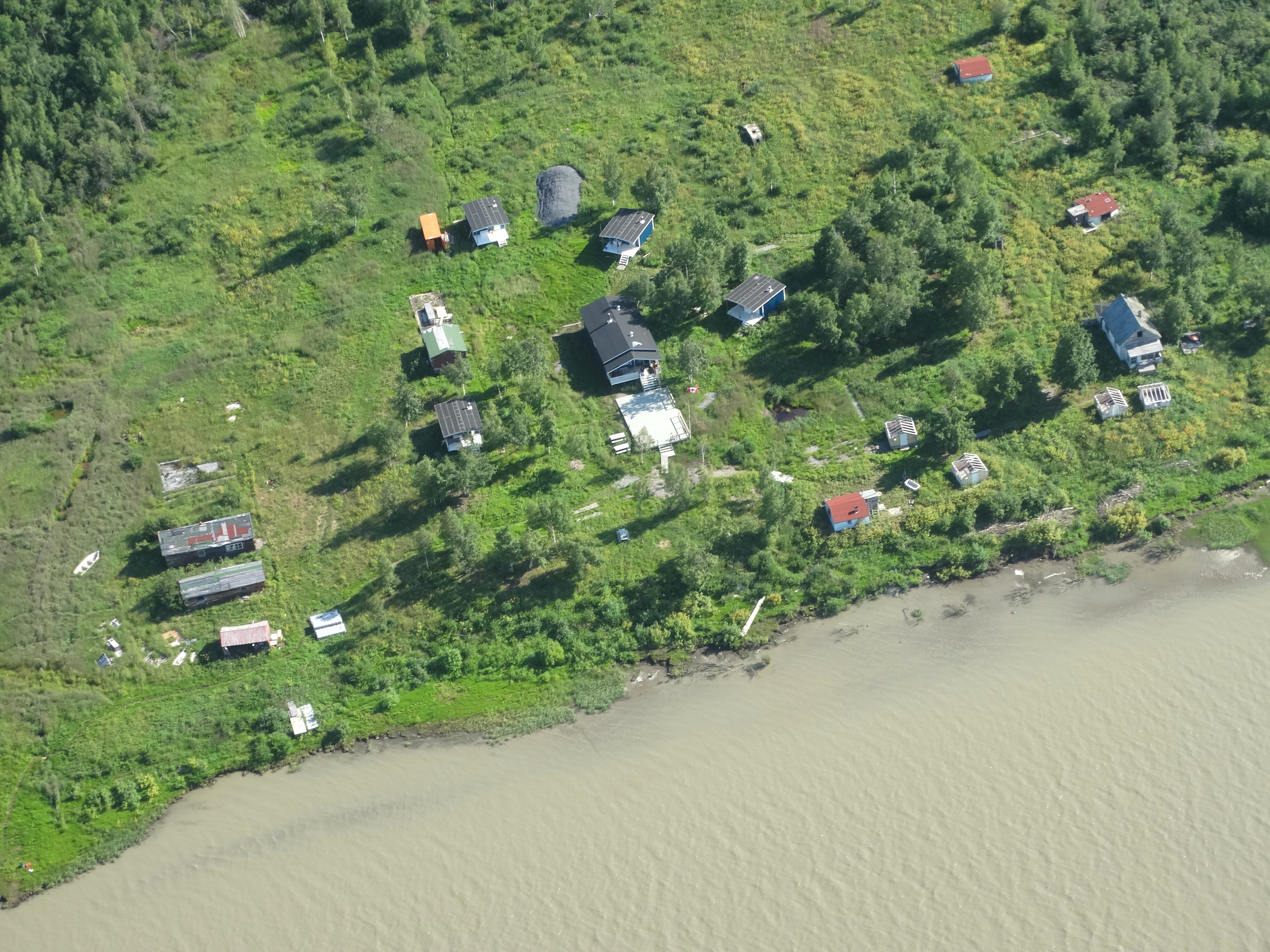
Reindeer Station viewed from the air, 2013

In the early 1920s, the Government of Canada received reports that the wild caribou herds of the Western Arctic were in steep decline. This would have placed the local Inuvialuit in danger of starvation. A similar event in 1890s Alaska led the United States Government to purchase a large herd of reindeer from Europe, introducing Native Alaskans to Old World animal husbandry practices. This Alaska Reindeer Service, headquartered at the Teller Reindeer Station, proved to be a modest success. In 1926, the Canadians decided to duplicate the program, hiring Danish botanist Erling Porsild to choose a suitable nucleus for the Canadian reindeer industry. By 1928, he had identified Mackenzie Delta as having the greatest potential, and the construction of Reindeer Station began. The next year, the federal government entered into a $225,000 contract with American "reindeer king" Carl J. Lomen to deliver 3,000 reindeer to the Canadian Arctic. The drive covered a distance of 2,400 km (1,500 mi) from Lomen's headquarters in Nome, Alaska, and a team of Norwegian Sámi herders were hired to drive the herd.

Government officials expected the drive to be completed by 1931, but it was beset by accidents almost immediately. While the herd was still being assembled, its corral was destroyed by a storm in November 1929. Two stampedes occurred in July 1931 and March 1933, greatly delaying the journey. American and Canadian newspapers often reported on the delayed drive, and the party's Sámi leader, Andrew Bahr, was nicknamed "The Arctic Moses". By June 1934, the herd reached the ice-covered Mackenzie Delta, but a storm triggered a third stampede, causing the animals to bolt back to the western shore. Warm summer conditions meant that another crossing could not be attempted until the next year.

On March 6, 1935, the herd was successfully corralled at Reindeer Station. Of the 3,000 animals specified in the contract, 2,382 arrived, but only 20 per cent of the herd was found to have originated in Alaska. The drive was so delayed that the rest were born along the way.

At its peak, Reindeer Station was a self-sufficient community with a population of about 90 people, mainly herders and their families. Amenities included a post office, school, church, generating plant, and Hudson's Bay Company trading post.

Originally, the reindeer program was intended to replace the traditional lifestyle of the Inuvialuit. A three-year apprenticeship program would produce self-sufficient reindeer herders, each responsible for their own herd and territory. However, this difficult and lonely career did not prove popular, especially as it provided a lower income than hunting and trapping. From 1935 to the mid-1950s, only seven independent herds were established. The program was finally extinguished by new postwar developments in the Arctic. For those Inuvialuit willing to consider non-traditional wage labour, the construction of the DEW Line and the new town of Inuvik provided much higher incomes. The federal government sold the reindeer herd in 1960, and it remains privately owned today. It was renamed from Reindeer Depot to Reindeer Station on March 21, 1962.

While most historic buildings have been removed from Reindeer Station, the Inuvialuit Regional Corporation continues to conduct traditional camps and workshops at the site. Modern uses are limited by landslide risk.

Filmmaker Peter Lynch profiled the project in the 1998 documentary film The Herd.
