= Anikovik River =

River in Alaska, United States

Coordinates: 65°30′N 167°41′W

Anikovik River (alternate Anakovik) is a waterway in the U.S. state of Alaska. It heads in the York Mountains about 15 miles (24 km) from the Bering Sea. As it leaves the mountains, it has a westerly course, but bending sharply to the south, it flows in that direction to the sea. It has a broad, flat flood plain, from 300 feet (91 m) to 0.5 miles (0.80 km) in width. In the upper part of its course, the river flows in greenstones, but below its bend, to the south, it cuts phyllites and slates. A rough estimate of the fall of river makes it about 15–18 feet (4.6–5.5 m) per mile. Buhner Creek joins Anakovik River about 2 miles (3.2 km) above the mouth of Deer Creek.

It is situated about 12 miles (19 km) east of Cape Prince of Wales and is 15 miles (24 km) long. Through the greater part of its length, it flows across the York Plateau, in which it has cut a comparatively broad valley. For several miles above its mouth, the valley and river bed contain gravels several feet deep and 200–300 feet (61–91 m) wide. In 1900, the whole of this river was regarded as gold-placer ground, but eventually, all the workings were abandoned. The fine gold was generally bright, but the nuggets were iron stained. Cassiterite and magnetite were found with the gold in the concentrates.

A small settlement at the mouth of Anakovik River, known as York, is the distributing point for the region; it is about 85 miles (137 km) from Nome and 45 miles (72 km) from Port Clarence.
