= List of places in Alaska (Y) =

This list of cities, towns, unincorporated communities, counties, and other recognized places in the U.S. state of Alaska also includes information on the number and names of counties in which the place lies, and its lower and upper zip code bounds, if applicable.

Name of place	Number of counties	Principal county	Lower zip code	Upper zip code
Yakataga	1	Valdez-Cordova Census Area	99574	
Yakutat	1	City and Borough of Yakutat	99689	
Yakutat Airport	1	City and Borough of Yakutat	99689	
Yakutat City and Borough School District	1	City and Borough of Yakutat		
Yistletaw	1	Yukon-Koyukuk Census Area		
York	1	Nome Census Area		
Yukon Flats Regional Educational Attendance Area	2	Southeast Fairbanks Census Area		
Yukon Flats Regional Educational Attendance Area	2	Yukon-Koyukuk Census Area		
Yukon Koyukuk Regional Educational Attendance Area	1	Yukon-Koyukuk Census Area		
Yukon-Charley Rivers National Preserve	2	Southeast Fairbanks Census Area	99501	
Yukon-Charley Rivers National Preserve	2	Yukon-Koyukuk Census Area	99501	
Yukon Flats	1	Yukon-Koyukuk Census Area		
Yupiit Regional Educational Attendance Area	1	Bethel Census Area		
