= James Allodi =

Canadian actor, writer and director

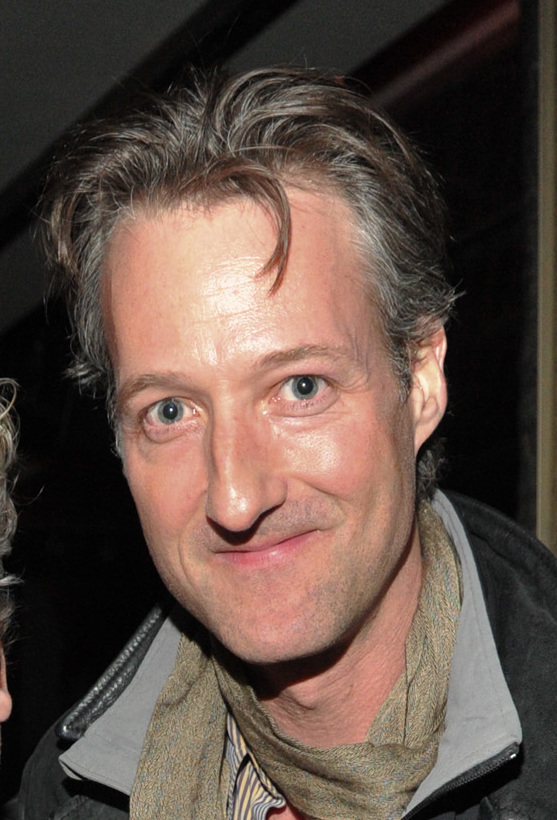
- Born: February 26, 1967 (age 59); Toronto, Ontario, Canada
- Other name: Jim Allodi
- Occupation: actor

James Allodi (born February 26, 1967) is a Canadian actor, writer and director.

== Career ==
James Allodi earned a Bachelor of Fine Arts, with a Major in Film, from New York University. Since then, the writer, director, and actor has amassed an impressive resume of stage, television and film credits. His first feature film was the critically acclaimed, off-beat comedy The Uncles. Television directing credits include Naked Josh (which won him a Gemini Award for best direction), Rent-A-Goalie, Paradise Falls, Degrassi, and The Associates.

As an actor, he starred in Daniel MacIvor's Wilby Wonderful, Paul Gross' Men With Brooms and Peter Lynch's Genie Award nominated feature-length documentary The Herd.

Allodi had a recurring role in the television series Once A Thief, and has appeared in numerous other series including The Associates, The Newsroom, and Due South.

== Filmography ==
- Kung Fu: The Legend Continues (1995)
- Due South (1994, 1996)
- Once a Thief (1998)
- PSI Factor: Chronicles of the Paranormal (1997, 1999)
- The Herd (1998)
- Elimination Dance (1998)
- American Whiskey Bar (1998)
- When Ponds Freeze Over (1998)
- Good Will Hunting (1998)
- The Five Senses (1999)
- Top of the Food Chain (1999)
- Thrill Seekers (1999) - FBI Agent Stanton
- The Uncles (2000)
- The Associates (2001)
- Men with Brooms (2002)
- Wilby Wonderful (2004)
- Snow Cake (2006)
- Naked Josh (2006)
- ReGenesis (2007)
