= Arrowhead (1994 film) =

- Directed by: Peter Lynch
- Written by: Peter Lynch
- Produced by: Emmet Sheil; Peter Lynch
- Starring: Don McKellar
- Cinematography: Miroslaw Baszak
- Edited by: Caroline Christie
- Music by: Anne Bourne; Ken Myhr
- Release date: 1994
- Running time: 30 minutes
- Country: Canada
- Language: English

Arrowhead is a 1994 Canadian mockumentary short film, directed by Peter Lynch.

== Plot summary ==
The film stars Don McKellar as Ray Bud, a Toronto man taking a film crew on a walking tour of Thorncliffe Park, ostensibly to show where he purportedly found a mastodon skeleton in childhood, but ultimately revealing much more about his own teenage history of engaging in petty vandalism to cope with his sense of alienation in an urban neighbourhood defined entirely by non-descript concrete high rise apartments.

Asked to describe the film's themes, Lynch characterized it as "if you took Jurassic Park, Home Alone and Wayne's World and turned it into a BBC archeology documentary on highrise living, you would get Arrowhead." The film was inspired by Lynch's rediscovery as an adult of an old indigenous arrowhead he had found as a child.

== Cast ==
- Don McKellar as Ray Bud
- Hadley Obodiac as Reporter
- Namir Khan as Custodian

== Release ==
The film had its theatrical premiere in Toronto in January 1994, as the opening film to screenings of the French film Barjo.

== Awards ==
The film won the Genie Award for Best Theatrical Short Film at the 15th Genie Awards in 1994.
