= Port Clarence Bay =

Waterway in Alaska

Coordinates: 65°16′40″N 166°4′50″W

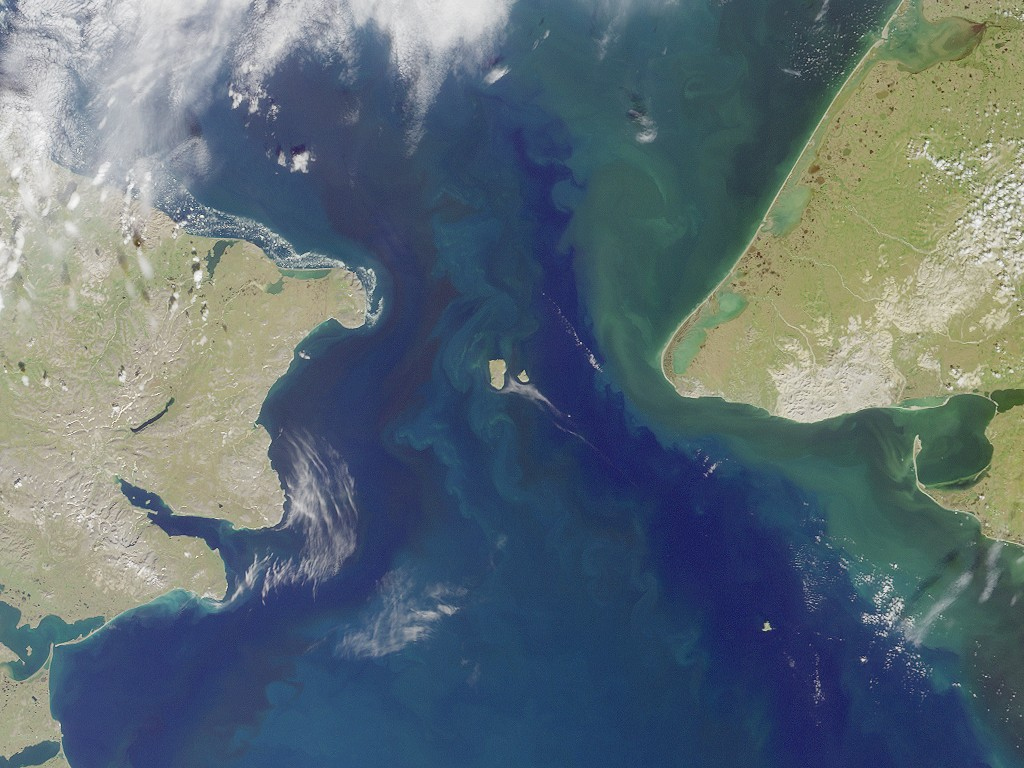
Port Clarence Bay is the large bight on the eastern side of Bering Strait

Port Clarence Bay is a waterway in the U.S. state of Alaska. It has the only harbor and safe anchorage for large vessels in Seward Peninsula. The bay is located 25 miles southeast of York. It is a large body of comparatively deep water, nearly circular in outline, and cut off from the sea by a long, low sand spit, which terminates in Point Spencer at the entrance to the bay. Along the north side of Port Clarence Bay, there is a shallow lagoon, separated from the bay by a narrow sand spit. This lagoon extends several miles west of the entrance to Port Clarence. The hamlet of Port Clarence, Alaska is situated on the bay.

== Geography ==
The harbor at Port Clarence Bay, close to the strait, is free from ocean swell, and was the rendezvous for the Arctic whaling fleet. The bay itself is clear of ice about June 25 to 30. There were three native settlements on the northeast side of the bay, and the dwellers assembled on Point Spencer in the early part of July for trade with the whaling vessels.

The bay is formed by a sand spit which extends from the mainland west and then north, terminating in Point Spencer. The end of the point is quite bold-to and can be approached as close as 1 mile, with depth of 7 fathoms. The channel between Point Spencer and Point Jackson, on the north shore, is about 4 miles wide, clear of danger, and carries from 7 to 9 fathoms. One and one-half miles south of Point Spencer a shoal makes into the bay from the sand spit, having depths of 2.5 fathoms 1 mile off. The northern half of the bay has a general depth of 7 fathoms as close as 1 mile from the shore; the southern half of the bay shoals gradually from this depth toward the shore, and the extreme southern part is very shoal. The north shore is clear of danger, and can be approached as close as i mile, the soundings decreasing regularly to the beach.

Port Clarence connects at its northeast end with Grantley Harbor, which is 3 to 4 miles wide, about 12 miles long, and connects at its eastern end by a narrow, difficult channel with a large lake farther inland. The mouth of the harbor is formed by two sand spits which slightly overlap. The water westward of the sand spits is shoal, but there is a channel close to the north one which can be used by vessels drawing 12 feet or less, but which should be sounded out before attempting to enter. Inside the harbor, the depths range from 2£ to 3 fathoms, and it is probable that a draft of 12 feet can be taken through the channel to the lake. Vessels have gone into Grantley Harbor to heave down and repair on the north sand spit.

Fresh water can be obtained in several places in Port Clarence, the best being from a stream on the east side south of Cape Riley and bearing east-southeast from Point Spencer.

The anchorage used by the whaling fleet is in 5 fathoms, just inside Point Spencer.

In this vicinity, fog is quite prevalent and very dense in summer.

Southwesterly winds increase and northeasterly winds decrease the height of tide.

Outside of Point Spencer the current sets northwestward with a velocity of 1 to 2 knots.

A shoal having a least reported depth of 1.5 fathoms lies nearly 5 miles offshore and about halfway between Cape Douglass and Point Spencer, and vessels should keep well outside of it. Extending about west-northwest from this shoal toward Cape York is a ridge having hard bottom and depths ranging from 4 fathoms near its southeastern end to 5 fathoms in about the latitude of Point Spencer. This ridge extends nearly to the north shore.
