= The Herd (1998 film) =

1998 Canadian documentary film

- Directed by: Peter Lynch
- Written by: Peter Lynch; Nicholas McKinney
- Produced by: Peter Starr
- Starring: Colm Feore; James Allodi; Graham Greene; David Hemblen; Doug Lennox; Don McKellar; Mark McKinney
- Cinematography: Rudolf Blahacek
- Edited by: Caroline Christie
- Music by: Ken Myhr
- Production company: National Film Board of Canada
- Release date: September 12, 1998 (TIFF)
- Running time: 100 minutes
- Country: Canada
- Language: English

The Herd is a Canadian documentary film, directed by Peter Lynch and released in 1998. The film documents the history of the Canadian government's failed Reindeer Station project of 1929, when it attempted to transport a herd of reindeer from Alaska to the Mackenzie River delta in the Northwest Territories.

The film blends archival footage with docudrama reenactments acted by a cast including Colm Feore, James Allodi, Graham Greene, David Hemblen, Doug Lennox, Don McKellar and Mark McKinney.

The film premiered at the 1998 Toronto International Film Festival. It received a television broadcast on CBC Television in 2001.

The film received a Genie Award nomination for Best Feature Length Documentary at the 19th Genie Awards.
