= Sami Siida of North America =

The Sami Siida of North America (Northern Sami: Davvi-Amerihká Sámi Siida) is a loosely organized group of regional communities, primarily in Canada and the United States, who share the Sámi culture and heritage from the arctic and sub-arctic regions of Norway, Sweden, Finland and the Kola Peninsula of Russia. This area has traditionally been referred to using the endonyms Sápmi and Samiland as well as the exonym Lapland. Individuals within the North American Siida are immigrants, descendants of immigrants, or are supporters of the Sami culture, although may not have any family lineage from Sápmi.

== Purpose ==
The North American Siida often performs educational shows, Sami community get-togethers, and related events over the course of the year, often with other Scandinavian events such as FinnFestUSA, American Swedish Institute, and the Norwegian-American Bygdelagenes Fellesraad (NABF). The Siida also hosts a larger gathering approximately every two years called the "Siiddastallen." Within the NABF, the Siida has a strong representative status as a separate Lag under that organization, as a part of the Lapmark Lag.

The Siida also serves as a cultural ‘storehouse’ to disseminate and exchange knowledge between individuals about Sami culture and provide moral support for a cultural identity that is spread out over an entire continent. The Siida also acknowledges individuals who are considered ‘elders’ within the community because of their cultural knowledge, and who are sought after for this reason. The Siida also maintains an observer seat on the International Saami Council.

=== Siida structure ===
There are some differences between the Scandinavian Siidas and the North American Sami Siida. The Scandinavian Sami siida system covers a whole range of Sami culture and economic interests, such as pastoral rights for reindeer herding, geography, and varied economic agreements, and describes a legal definition of varying degrees within each of the Scandinavian countries. Within North America, these legal definitions of “siida” do not apply. Rather it is a group of individuals and families who have chosen to identify and show support for the Sami culture and the immigrant issues that are inherent to the North American Sami.

The Siida was started in February 1996 and the Arran newsletter, based in Minneapolis, Minnesota, is the official publication of the Siida. It is published four times a year.

== Elected Council Chairs ==
- Anja Kitti-Walhelm, 1996–2000
- Cari Mayo, 2000–2005
- Marlene Wisuri, 2005–2011
- John Edward Xavier, 2012–2016
- Mervi Maarit Salo, 2016–present

== See also ==
- Árran
- Báiki
- Sámi Americans
