= South Park Community Church =

Historic church in Colorado, United States

- U.S. National Register of Historic Places
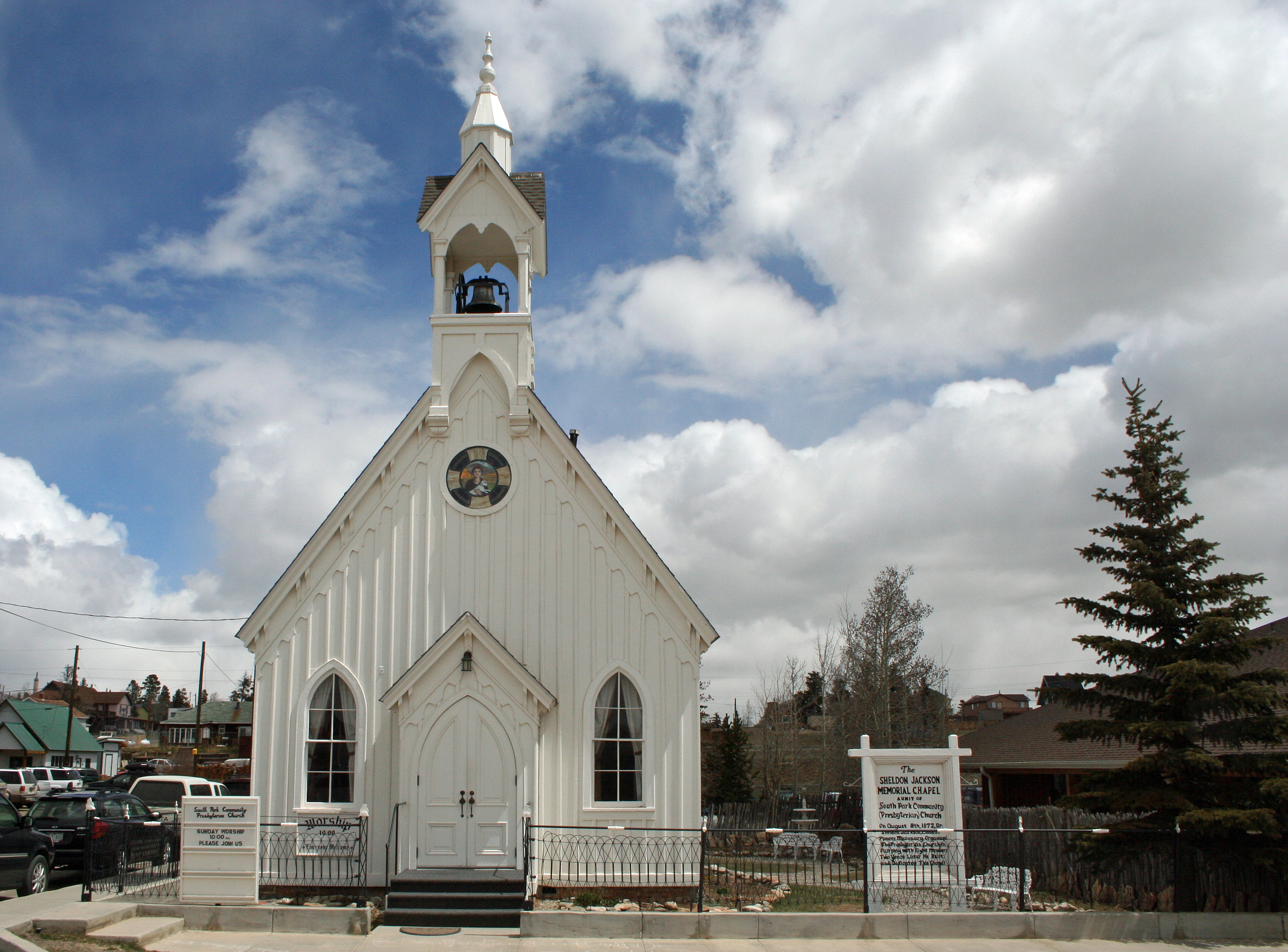

- Location within Colorado Location within the United States
- Location: 6th and Hathaway Sts., Fairplay, Colorado
- Coordinates: 39°13′29″N 105°59′57″W
- Area: less than one acre
- Built: 1874
- Architectural style: Gothic, High Victorian, Carpenter Gothic
- NRHP reference No.: 77000382
- Added to NRHP: November 22, 1977

The South Park Community Church is an historic Carpenter Gothic-style church building located at 600 Hathaway Street in Fairplay, Park County, Colorado. Built in 1874, the church was founded by Presbyterian missionary Sheldon Jackson. Its board and batten siding and lancet windows are typical of Carpenter Gothic churches. Originally the Sheldon Jackson Memorial Chapel, the structure is now the South Park Community (Presbyterian) Church.

On November 22, 1977, the church was added to the National Register of Historic Places.
