= Cyberman (film) =

2001 documentary film directed by Peter Lynch

- Directed by: Peter Lynch
- Written by: David Weaver; Bridget Newson
- Produced by: Michael Allder
- Starring: Steve Mann; William Gibson; Richard Mann
- Cinematography: Rudolf Blahacek
- Edited by: Caroline Christie
- Music by: Ken Myhr
- Distributed by: Canadian Broadcasting Corporation (CBC)
- Release date: 2001
- Running time: 87 minutes
- Country: Canada
- Language: English

Cyberman is a 2001 documentary film about Steve Mann, inventor of the EyeTap. It was directed by Peter Lynch, but much of the material in the film was also shot by Mann himself, through his EyeTap. Thus Cyberman may well have been the first film in which the subject incidentally or existentially (i.e. just by being himself) shot much of the material used in the film.

The book Cyborg... was released the same year, and much of the material in the film is based on material in an early draft of the book's manuscript.

Novelist William Gibson appears in the film, in conjunction with Mann's presentation at the TED (Technology Entertainment and Design) conference. Mann and Gibson were both presenters at TED, and the interview takes place immediately following their presentations at the conference.
