= Alaska Reindeer Service =

Government training system, created 1893

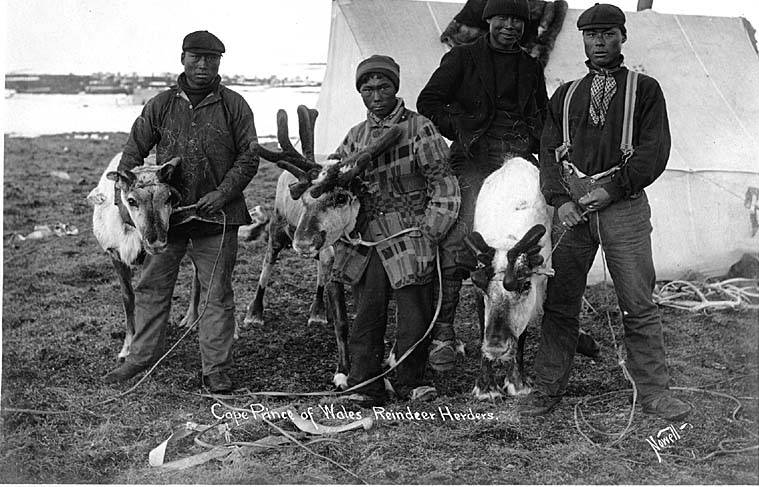
Alaskan reindeer herders, Cape Prince of Wales, ca. 1905

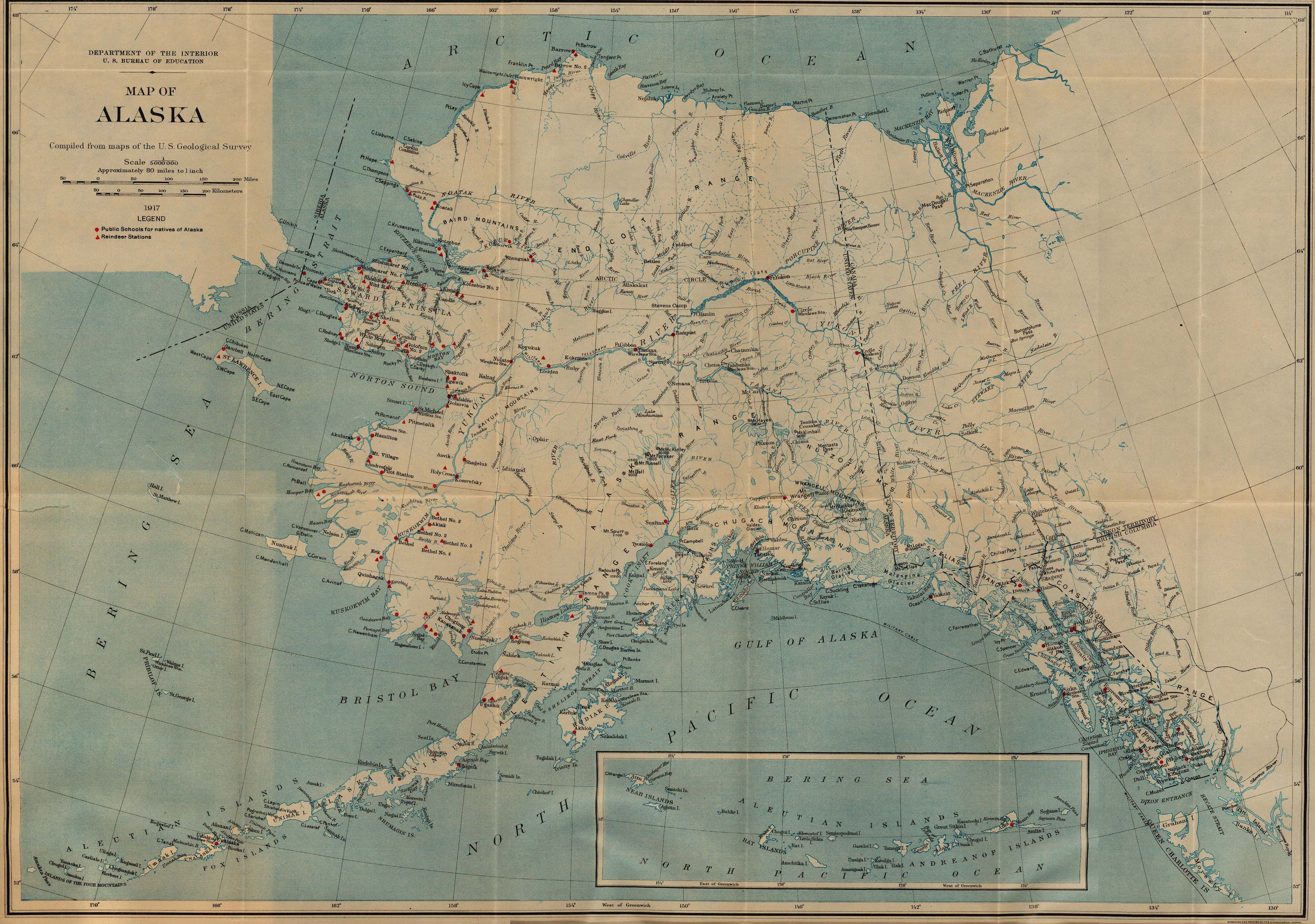
Alaska schools and reindeer stations (1917)

Alaska Reindeer Service (ARS) was established for the benefit of the U.S. territory of Alaska by Congressional action on March 3, 1893. The ARS was an integral part of the educational system of northern and western Alaska. The superintendent of education of Alaska Natives had general supervision of the work. The district superintendents in northern and western Alaska were supervisors of the reindeer industry within their districts. The first annual expenditure for the period of 1893-94 was US$5,998.

The establishment of the ARS was the earliest Governmental action providing, by the introduction of a new industry, practical vocational training adapted to community needs, guaranteeing assured support, and resulting in training indigenous peoples into independence. The purpose of the ARS was to accomplish the general distribution of the reindeer among the villages as rapidly as the Inupiat and Yupiit could be trained, by means of a system of apprenticeship, to care for and use the reindeer, resulting in the ultimate establishment of the reindeer enterprise upon a self-supporting basis, for the Inupiat of the Seward Peninsula. "Sheldon Jackson commissioned Sámi herders from Norway to move to Alaska and teach apprentice Alaska Natives herding techniques, such as driving and milking reindeer, building and using corrals, marking ears, and working herding dogs."

The ARS affected a vast area: the northernmost station was Point Barrow; the southernmost station was at Ugashik; the westernmost station was near Cape Prince of Wales; and the easternmost station was at Tanana.

== Introduction ==
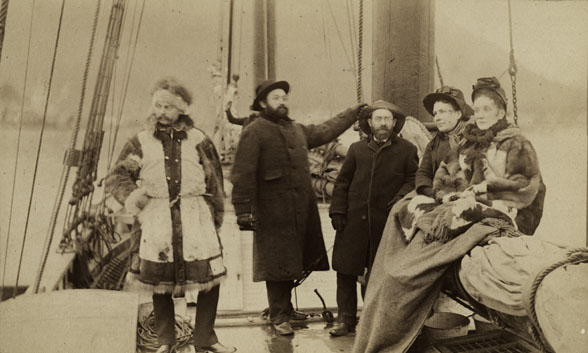
Sheldon Jackson on USS Bear

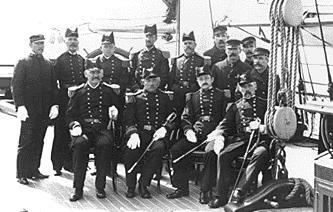
Capt. Michael A. Healy (seated second from left) with the officers of the Bear (ca. 1885-95)

During the summer of 1890, Dr. Sheldon Jackson, General Agent for Education in Alaska and Presbyterian Minister, accompanied the revenue cutter Bear, Capt. Michael A. Healy, commanding, in its annual cruise in Bering Sea and the Arctic Ocean visiting all the important villages on both Alaskan and Siberian shores.

The Alaskan Inuit were found eking out a precarious existence upon the few whale, seal and walrus that they could catch. Across Bering Strait, in Siberia, but a few miles from Alaska, with climate and country the same, were tens of thousands of tame reindeer supporting thousands of people. The flesh and milk of the reindeer furnished food, its skin provided clothing and bedding, and in winter, the reindeer made possible rapid communication between the scattered villages. Both Jackson and Healy were impressed by the fact that it would be a wise national policy to introduce domestic reindeer from Siberia into Alaska as a source and supply for food and clothing to the Alaskan Eskimos in the vicinity of Bering Strait. Upon his return to Washington in September, 1890, Jackson brought the matter to the attention of the Commissioner of Education, Dr. William Torrey Harris, who at once endorsed the project and gave it his support.

== History ==
Pending the securing of a congressional appropriation for the support of the enterprise, an appeal was made to individuals for a preliminary sum in order that an experiment might be commenced at once. With $2,146 thus secured, 16 deer were purchased in 1891, and 171 in 1892. In 1893, Congress realized the importance of the movement and made the first appropriation of $6,000 for the work of importing reindeer from Siberia into Alaska. It continued its support by annual appropriations ranging from $5,000 to $25,000, the appropriation for the fiscal year 1919–20 being $7,500.

During nine seasons, the revenue cutter Bear carried agents of the Bureau of Education back and forth between Siberia and Alaska, and transported Siberian reindeer to Alaska. The work was exacting in the extreme, beleaguered, uncharted coast, long delays in dangerous waters, patient bargaining in sign language with Siberians, tedious payment for the reindeer, hard work in transporting deer in the Bear's boats from shore to ship, discomfort on board while on the Way to Alaska, and much labor in the landing of deer on the Alaskan side. The total number of deer thus imported into Alaska from 1892 to 1902, when the Russian Government withdrew its permit, was 1,280.

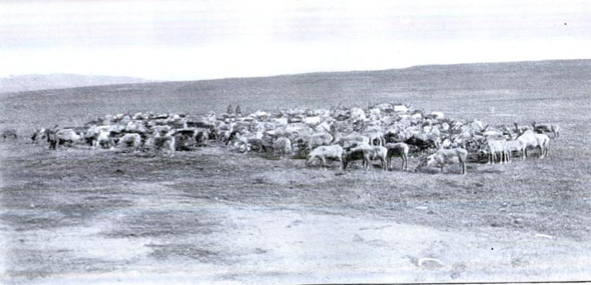
Reindeer at Teller Station, 1892

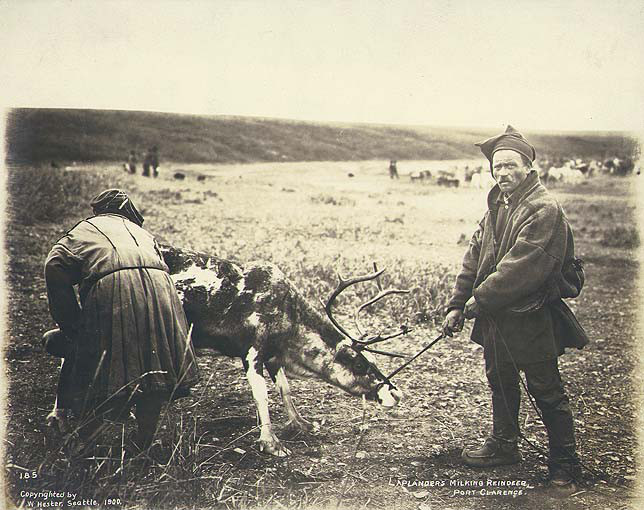
Sámi herders milking reindeer, Port Clarence, Alaska, 1900

At the commencement of the service, Port Clarence, on the Seward Peninsula, the nearest harbor to northeast Siberia, was selected as the receiving point for the reindeer brought over season after season. As the work grew, Teller Reindeer Station, on Port Clarence, became the base of supply from which winter after winter, herds were sent out over northern Alaska to establish new centers of the reindeer industry.

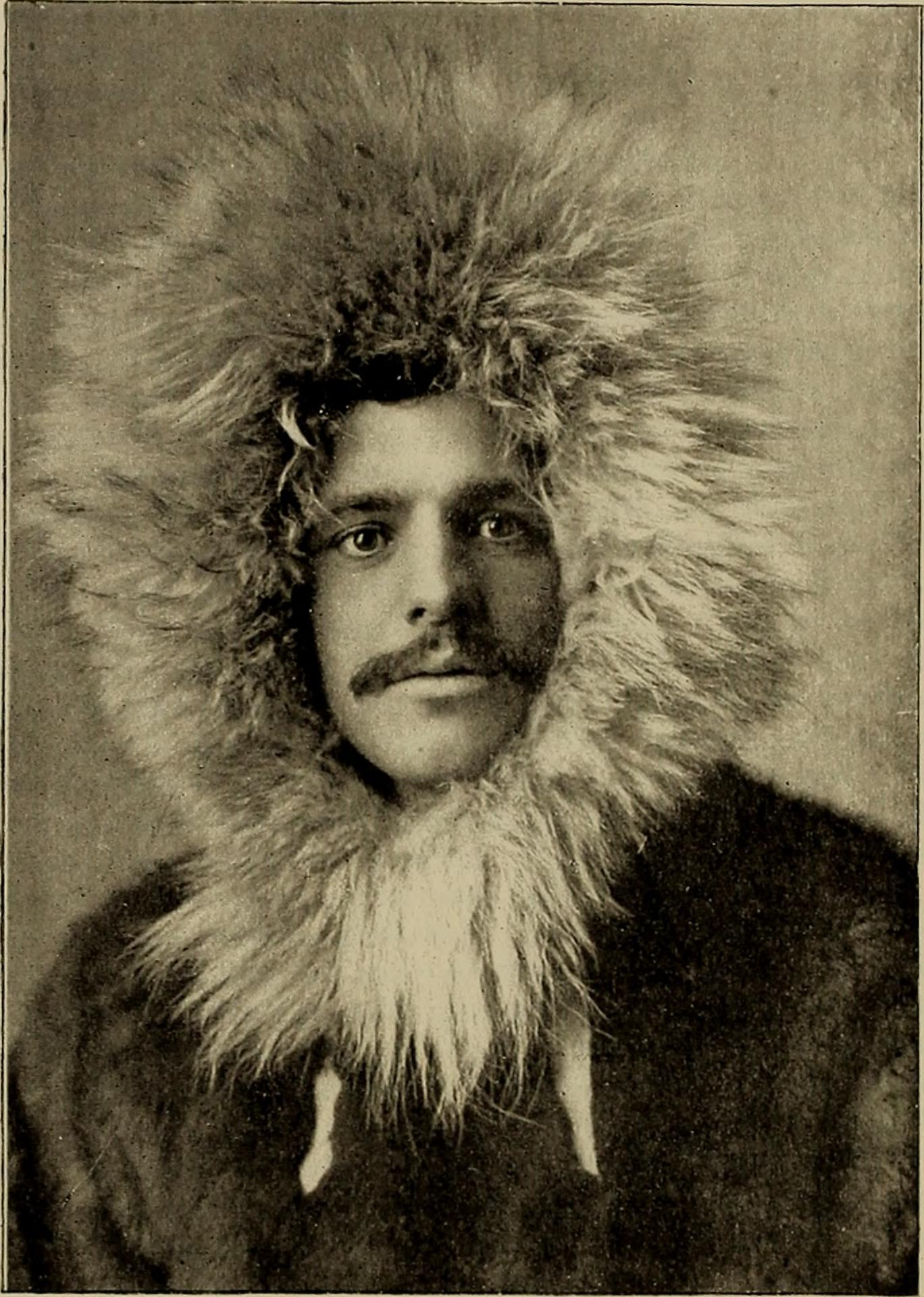
William Thomas Lopp

In 1907, William Thomas Lopp, who became superintendent education of indigenous peoples of Alaska, in charge of all the work of the Bureau of Education in Alaska, was called to Washington, D.C. to codify regulations for the reindeer service. During a long period of service in Arctic Alaska, Lopp had travelled widely in that region. He knew the people by name, he spoke their language, and in 1897–98, he had been one of the men to drive a herd of reindeer from Cape Prince of Wales to Point Barrow, in the dead of winter, for the relief of a party of whalers reported as starving at that point.

The regulations adopted provide for the distribution of the reindeer by a system of apprenticeship, by which promising and ambitious young Alaskans are selected by each local superintendent as apprentices for a term of four years, receiving at the end of each year the number of reindeer prescribed by the regulations. Upon the satisfactory termination of his apprenticeship the apprentice becomes a herder and assumes entire charge of his herd, subject to the supervision of the district and local school authorities. In accordance with the regulations, the herder must in turn employ apprentices and distribute reindeer to them, thus becoming an additional factor in the extension of the enterprise. In order to safeguard the reindeer industry for the natives, the regulations forbid the disposal of female reindeer to others than natives of Alaska.

The Canadian government, aware of the success of the Alaska Reindeer Service, purchased a herd of 3,000 Alaska reindeer in the 1920s. In an arduous journey that ultimately took five years, the animals were driven from Nome to Reindeer Station, Northwest Territories. However, few of the native Inuvialuit ever chose to take up the profession.

== Education ==
The ARS was under the administration of the United States Bureau of Education, Department of the Interior, with headquarters in Seattle and with seven superintendents in Alaska. The ARS was an integral part of the educational system of northern and western Alaska. The district superintendents of schools were also the superintendents of the reindeer service. The teachers in charge of the US public schools in the regions affected by the reindeer industry were ex officio local superintendents of the reindeer herds in the vicinity of their schools. Traveling teachers were employed to go from one reindeer herd to another instructing the apprentices and herders in the elementary branches taught in the schools. The apprentices also, when practicable, attended the sessions of the schools in the vicinity of their herds.
