= Samuel Balto =

Northern Saami explorer and adventurer

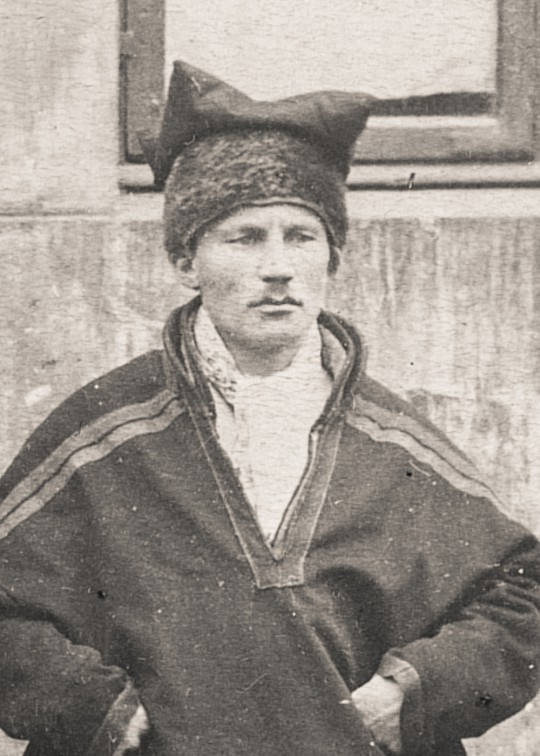
- Born: Samuel Johannesen Balto; May 5, 1861; Karasjok, Norway
- Died: 1921 (aged 59–60); Karasjok, Norway
- Occupations: Explorer, adventurer

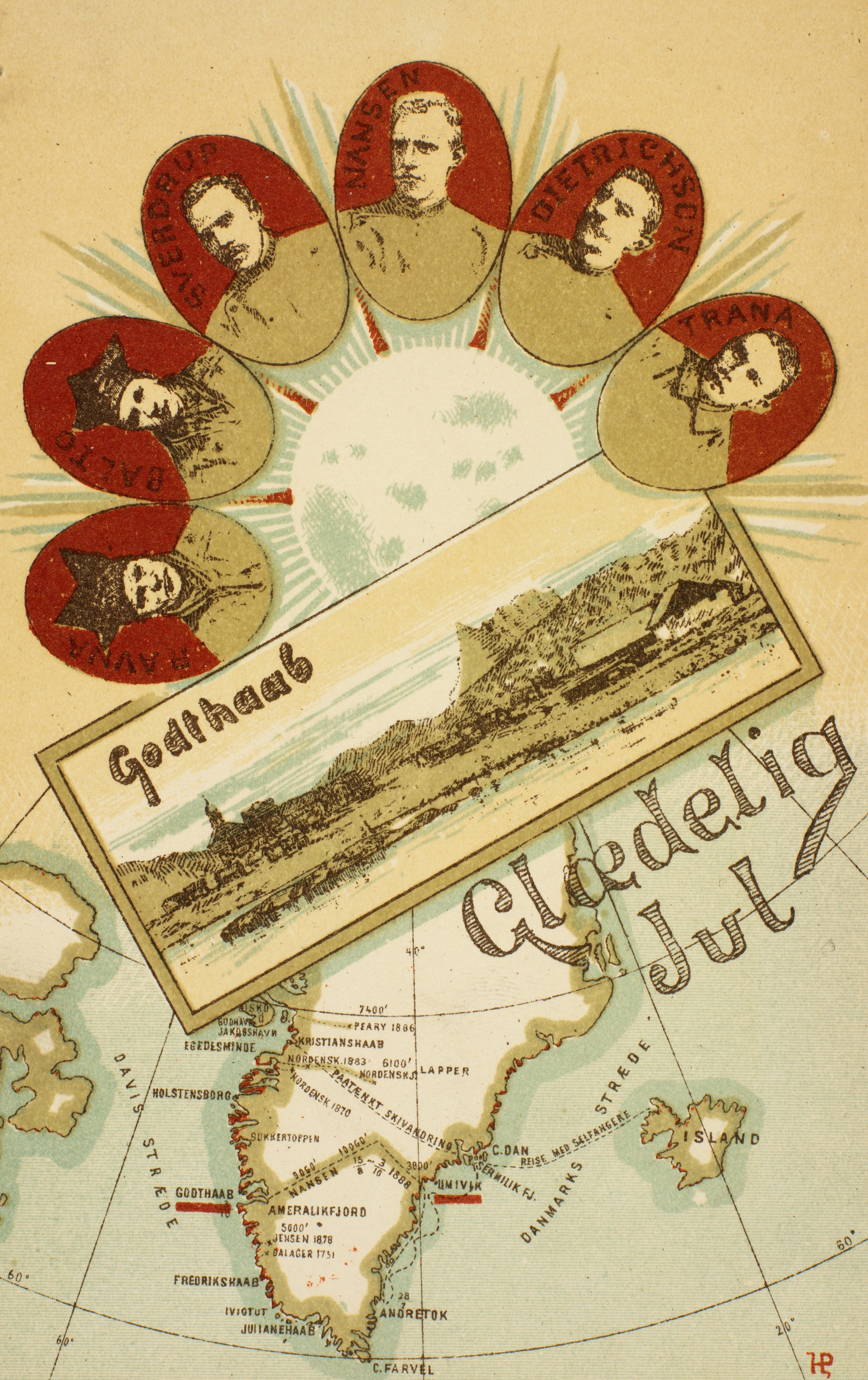
Postcard featuring of the members of Nansen's Trans-Greenland Expedition

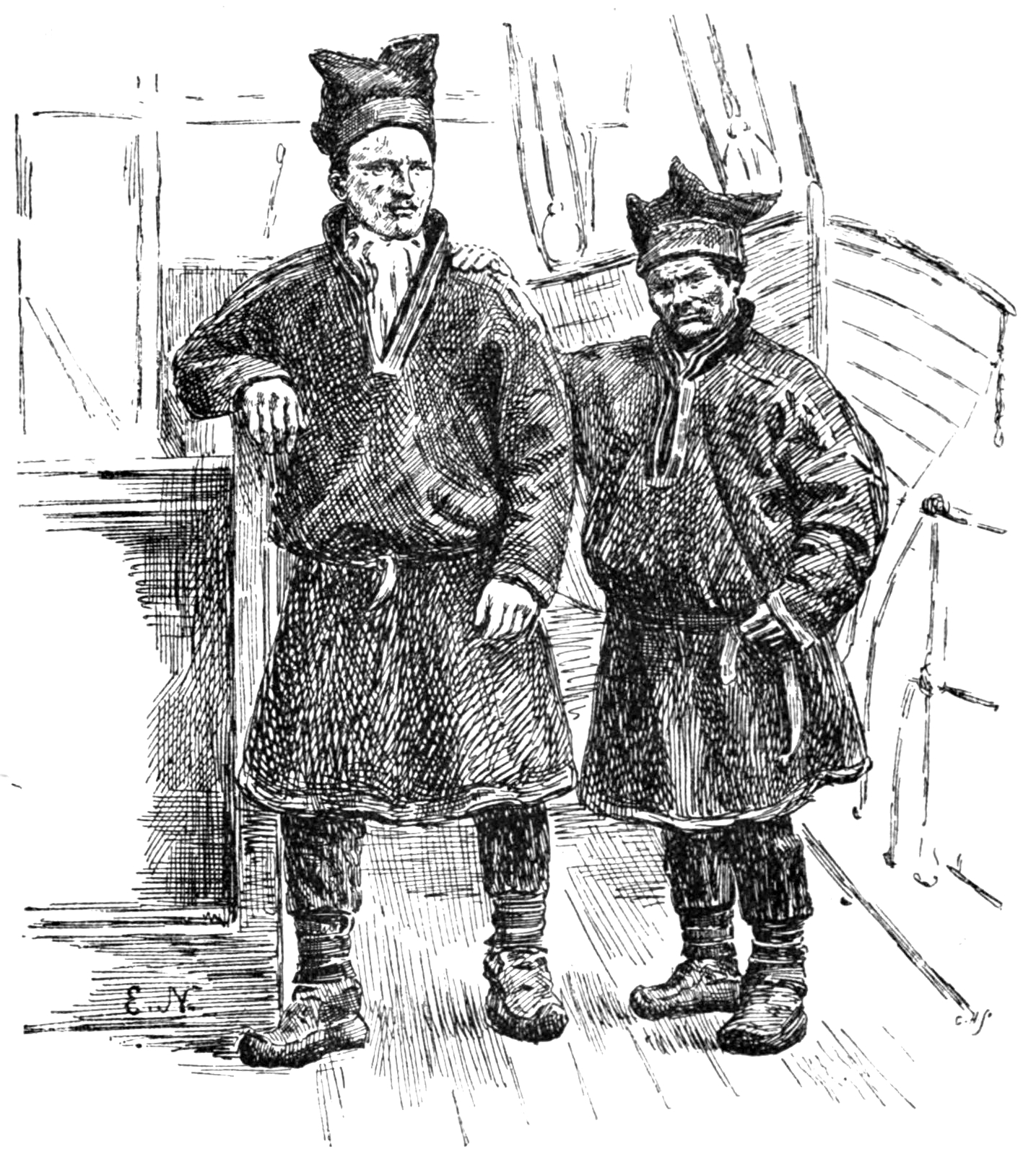
Samuel Balto with Ole Nilsen Ravna

Samuel Johannesen Balto (May 5, 1861 – 1921) was a Northern Saami explorer and adventurer. Balto skied with Fridtjof Nansen across Greenland in 1888–89.

== Biography ==
Samuel Johannesen Balto was born in Karasjok Municipality in Finnmark county, Norway. He had worked as a lumberjack, as well as in reindeer herding and fishing. In 1888, Balto was recruited by Fridtjof Nansen for Nansen's Trans-Greenland Expedition. Balto participated in the first recorded crossing of the interior of Greenland, together with Nansen and four other expedition members. Balto wrote his own book after the expedition: Med Nansen over Grønlandsisen i 1888 – Min reise fra Sameland til Grønland.

In 1898, Balto moved to Alaska and signed a two-year contract as a reindeer herder. In 1900, he led a large group of Sámi hired as reindeer herdsmen during the Lapland-Yukon Relief Expedition later known as the Manitoba Expedition. Samuel Balto, together with 113 other people from Finnmark were hired by Sheldon Jackson to be involved in the introduction of reindeer in Alaska. Jackson promoted a plan to import reindeer from Russia to introduce reindeer husbandry to the Inupiaq as a solution to their loss of subsistence resources. The group was responsible for transporting goods and mail from Nome, Alaska, to gold mining workers up the Yukon River valley in the central parts of Alaska. Eventually Samuel Balto became a gold miner at Nome, Alaska, during the Klondike Gold Rush. Balto staked three claims at a site which became known as Balto Creek.

Samuel Johannesen Balto died in 1921 in Karasjok.

== Legacy ==
Balto, the Alaskan sled dog made famous during the 1925 serum run to Nome, which transported diphtheria medication across the U.S. territory of Alaska to combat an epidemic, was named in his honor.

== See also ==
- Balto (dog), namesake
- Jason (1881 ship)

== Other sources ==
- Jackson, Sheldon Alaska and Missions on the north Pacific Coast (New York: Dodd, Mead & Company. 1880)
- Nansen, Fridtjof (tr. H.M. Gepp) The First Crossing of Greenland (London: Longmans, Green and Co. 1890)
- Salisbury, Gay; Laney Salisbury The Cruelest Miles: The Heroic Story of Dogs and Men in a Race against an Epidemic (New York: W.W. Norton & Company. 2003) ISBN 0-393-01962-4.
