= Árran (Sámi publication) =

Árran is an English language quarterly of Sámi culture and news. The editor of Árran is Evelyn Ashford, successor to long-time editor Arden Johnson. Árran was founded by the late Mel Olsen in 1995. Published by the Sami Siida of North America (SSNA), the newsletter is by and for Sami North Americans and friends. Árran headquarters are in Minneapolis, Minnesota. The SSNA council makes up the editorial advisory board.

The word árran refers to the fire in the center of the lavvu, the iconic tent-symbol of Sámi cultures. Issues contain articles relating to Sámi culture and identity, poetry, and news from Sápmi by contributors from Sápmi and North America. Árran also has a companion blog, currently under a remodeling program.

== See also ==
- Báiki an English journal about Sámi issues in northern America.
- Sami Siida of North America a network for Sámi in North America.
