= Teller Reindeer Station =

Coordinates: 65.257222°N 166.353889°W

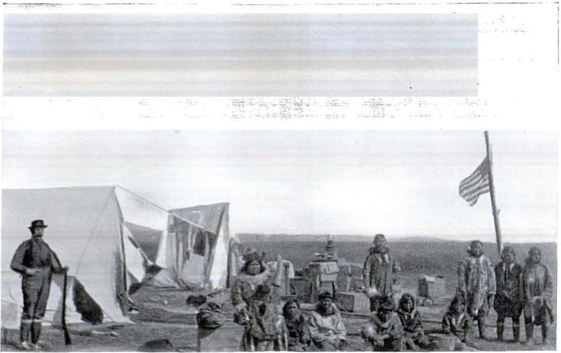
Taking possession of Teller Reindeer Station, June 29, 1892.

Teller Reindeer Station was located near Teller in the U.S. state of Alaska. The idea of transporting domestic reindeer from Siberia to western Alaska was first suggested by Captain Michael A. Healy, an officer in the United States Revenue Cutter Service, as a possible solution to the Native Alaskans' food shortage problem. The station was established in 1892 by Sheldon Jackson, Commissioner of Education in Alaska and a Presbyterian minister, who named it in honor of Henry M. Teller. The U.S. Government's Alaska Reindeer Service program ended in the early 1900s.

== History ==
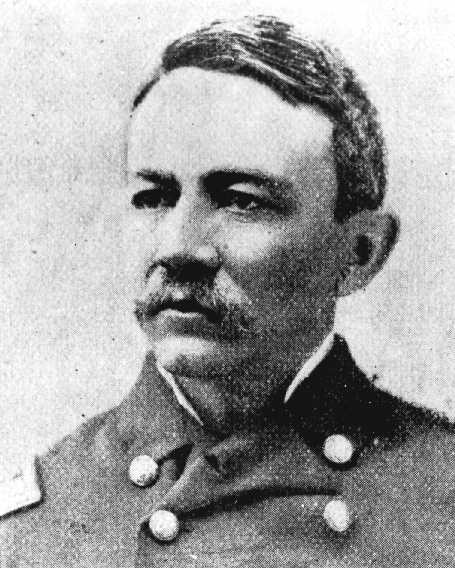
Captain Michael A. Healy, USRCS

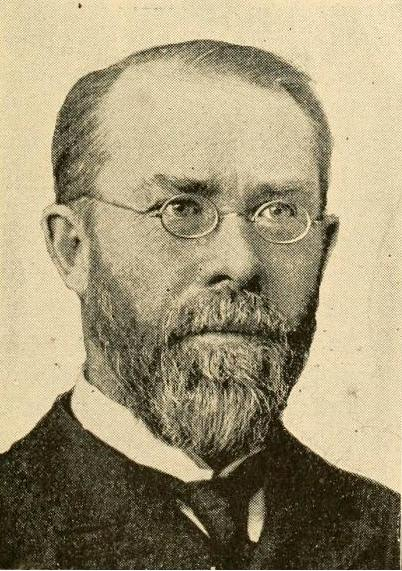
Sheldon Jackson

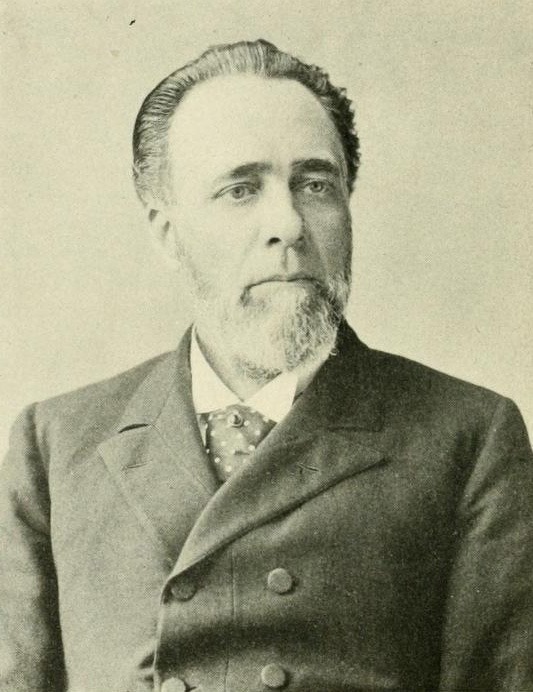
Henry M. Teller

On June 29, 1892, Sheldon Jackson visited the head of Port Clarence, Alaska, in search of a suitable location for the establishment of a reindeer station. In making a location, it was important to take into consideration nearness to the coast of Asia, character of harbor, position with reference to future distribution of reindeer, supply of good pasturage and water. Finding that all these conditions were best met at the watering station of the whaling fleet, on the extreme northeast corner of the bay, near Grantley Harbor, Jackson selected that point for the reindeer station, and on the same day put up two tents and landed from the steamer Newport the provisions and supplies for the station.

Since Henry M. Teller, as Secretary of the Interior, in the spring of 1885 authorized the establishment of the common school system of Alaska, and also that since the agitation commenced for the introduction of domesticated reindeer into Alaska, he had taken a leading part in securing the needed Congressional legislation, Jackson named the station the "Teller Reindeer Station". To the north of Grantley Harbor, Muck-a-Charlie Peak rises to the height of 1,600 feet (490 m). At the head of the sand-spit between Port Clarence and Grantley Harbor is a large lagoon, and between the reindeer station and the base of the hills on the north are about a dozen fresh-water ponds or small lakes. At the extreme northeast corner of Port Clarence, near Grantley Harbor, and upon a small mountain creek, is the place that Jackson selected for the headquarters of the reindeer station. A few miles to the east of the station on Grantley Harbor was the location of the headquarters, for this region, of the Russian–American Telegraph Expedition of 1865 and 1867. On the bluff above the beach, at the place selected for the reindeer station, stood a log of driftwood upon which had been placed an empty barrel to indicate the location of a watering station. To the top of this post, Jackson's party hoisted the United States flag.

A few days after taking possession, the lumber and building materials for the station having been landed, Captain Healy sent his carpenters and a portion of his crew on shore and erected a substantial frame house, 20 by 60 feet in size. The supply of lumber, however, gave out before it was fully completed, so that it was not as comfortable for an Arctic winter as was intended. Before the completion of the frame building, Miner W. Bruce, the superintendent, had constructed a "dugout" for himself and assistant and another for the Siberian herders. These "dugouts" were occupied during the severity of the winter weather.

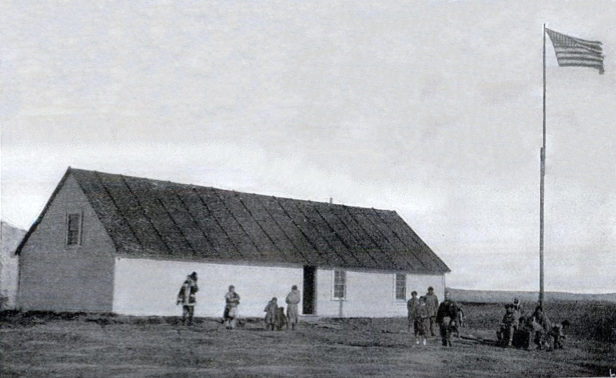
Headquarters

During the summer of 1893, additional lumber and material were sent to the station, and Healy again sent his carpenters and sailors on shore to do the needed work of placing the main station building in complete order for comfortable use. The whole house had double sides and double floor, with tarred paper between. A large "lean-to" was erected in the rear of the house for the use of the herders. Jackson's greatest success figured in the 1897 Overland Relief Expedition which saved marooned whalers near Point Barrow.

The winter of 1902 was the coldest since 1894, but proved to be fine weather for the reindeer. There were few hard storms; the fall of snow was light, and there was no thaw during the fall or early winter to cover the pasturage with a coating of ice. Spring 1903 came unusually early and was mild and dry, hence no fawns were lost because of cold and wet weather. Of the 276 fawns born, 240 lived. During the winter the herd was pastured on the Ahgeeopuk River, 5 miles (8 km) below the usual winter quarters. During the summer, they were kept 5 miles northwest from the station. From the Government herd at this station, during the winter of 1901-2, two herds were sent to Kotzebue Sound, one for the Friends' Mission and the other for Alfred Nilinia. Leaving the station November 12, they arrived at Kotzebue on December 16, 1901. On January 15, 1902, a herd of 100 reindeer was loaned to Per Spein and sent by the way of Golofnin Bay to Eaton Reindeer Station. On July 22, the Norwegian Evangelical Lutheran Synodical Mission at this station loaned to Serawlook, Erlingnuk, and Ahmahkdoolik, apprentices, each 10 deer from the mission herd.

== Personnel ==
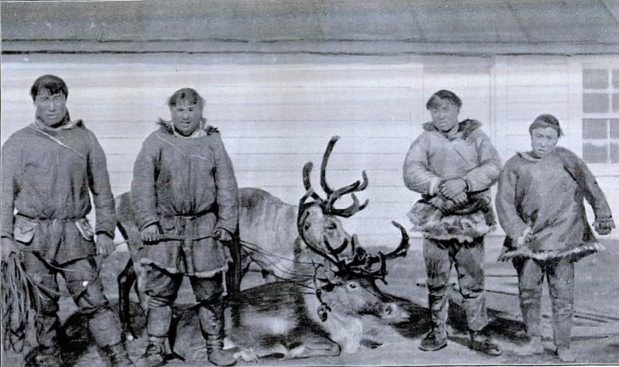
Siberian herders at Teller Reindeer Station

At the opening of the reindeer station in 1892, Miner Bruce, of Nebraska, was appointed superintendent, and Bruce Gibson, of California, assistant superintendent. During the season, four Siberians were secured and brought over by Healy as the principal herders. With these were placed several Inupiat men, who were to learn the trade of herding reindeer. Upon June 30, 1893, the incumbency of Bruce and Gibson having terminated, William Thomas Lopp, of the American Missionary Association station at Cape Prince of Wales, was appointed superintendent of the reindeer station. As he could not immediately remove from the mission station to the reindeer station, Healy detailed Lieutenant C.M. White, USRCS, as acting superintendent, until Lopp could take charge. Being unable to secure an assistant from the States, John Grubin, quartermaster on USRC Bear was allowed his discharge papers and made assistant superintendent of the station. The four Siberian herders during the summer were returned to their homes, and one of them, after a visit, returned for a second year. With him, three others were secured who came over for the first time. In the autumn, nine Inupiat apprentices entered upon a course of instruction.

Owing to the murder of Harrison R. Thornton, missionary at Cape Prince of Wales, on August 19, 1893, by two Inupiat, the mission station was closed for the year. Under the circumstances, Lopp, who had accepted the position of superintendent at the reindeer station, felt called upon to offer his services to the American Missionary Association of the Congregational church, and return to Cape Prince of Wales in the summer of 1894, if it was thought desirable. In order to secure some intelligent Norwegian or Swede, accustomed to the methods employed in the care of reindeer in Sápmi, on December 15, 1893, Jackson sent a notice to the Scandinavian papers of the United States, that the reindeer station wished to secure the services of men acquainted with the management of reindeer. The Scandinavian papers entered into the project and gave their space without compensation. About 250 replies were received. From among this number, largely upon the recommendation of Prof. Rasmus B. Anderson, William A. Kjelmann, of Madison, Wisconsin, was selected as the next superintendent of the reindeer station. Upon the selection of Kjelmann, Jackson sent him at once to Sápmi for the necessary personnel and their dogs. The reindeer fund of Congress for 1894 being exhausted, it became necessary to again appeal to private individuals for $1,000, to defray the expenses of sending Kjelmann to Sápmi, and to pay the transportation of Sámi herders and their families to the United States. The Sámi and Inupiat personnel included the Eira, Kemi, Larsen, Nakkila, Rist, Somby and Tornensis families.

== Herds ==
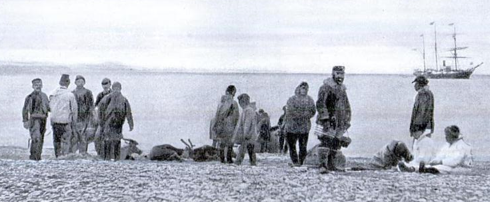
Landing the first herd of reindeer at Teller Station

During the summer of 1892, 171 reindeer were purchased in Siberia and landed at the station. At the time of landing at Port Clarence, two were lost by straying away. Twelve were so injured by transportation from Siberia that they either died or had to be killed. During the year, 13 others died from injuries received while fighting, or slipping upon the ice, making a total loss of 27. There was a gain of 79 fawns, born in the spring of 1893, leaving, on June 30, 1893, 222 reindeer in the herd. During the summer, 127 additional reindeer were purchased in Siberia, of which 124 were safely landed at the station, making a total, in September 1893, of 346. During the winter, the superintendent of the station trained 12 deer to draw sleds, and with his two teams of reindeer, made a successful trip to the mission station at Cape Prince of Wales, 60 miles (97 km) distant.

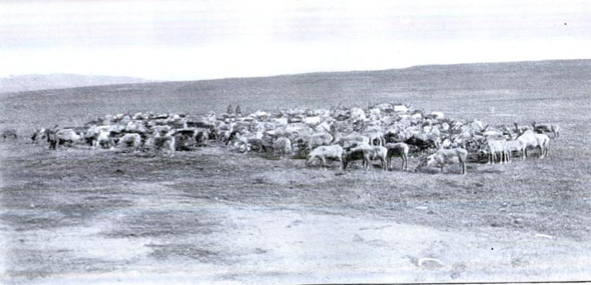
Teller Reindeer Station herd

The presence of the herd attracted attention from the local people, and delegations arrived during the winter to visit and inspect the herd, some of them coming from 300–400 miles (480–640 km) inland. The fears that had been expressed, that the reindeer would be destroyed by the native dogs, were not realized. The herders were armed and had strict orders to fire upon any dog interfering with the herd, and then to report the same to the superintendent, who had instructions to send for the owner of the dog and compensate him for the loss. During the entire year of 1893, it became necessary to shoot but five dogs that were interfering with the herd. During the sledge trip of the superintendent to Cape Prince of Wales, two or three times he staked out the deer in the neighborhood of villages with from 100 to 300 native dogs, and in no instance were they molested. Thus the difficulties that were anticipated in the introduction of reindeer into Alaska were met and solved.

== See also ==
- Alaska Reindeer Service
- Sámi Americans
