= York, Alaska =

Human settlement in Alaska

Coordinates: 65.494°N 167.684°W

York was a mining settlement in the U.S. state of Alaska during the late 19th- and early 20th-century.

The mining camp was located at the mouth of Anikovik River, at Cape York on the Seward Peninsula, about 80 miles (130 km) north-west of Nome and 45 miles (72 km) north-west of Port Clarence. Wales, the westernmost settlement on the mainland United States, is 15 miles (24 km) north-west of York at Cape Prince of Wales.

In the spring of 1900, York promised to be a place of importance and a post office was established in April, but in the early fall, its population had been reduced to about 20–30. The settlement included a number of log cabins and half a dozen substantial frame buildings. It was a distributing point for the region to the north, but during the stormy months of the fall, landing at York was difficult. The post office was closed in 1902 and the settlement's entire population died during the influenza epidemic of 1918. The disease reached Wales from York where it went on to kill 170 of Wales's 310 residents.
