= Báiki =

- Editor: Nathan Muus
- Former editors: Faith Fjeld
- Categories: Sámi culture
- Frequency: Biannual
- Format: print
- Publisher: Center for Environmental Economic Development
- Founder: Faith Fjeld
- Founded: 1991
- Country: United States
- Based in: Duluth, Minnesota
- Language: English
- Website: baiki.org
- ISSN: 1078-7399
- OCLC: 701755734

Báiki: The International Sámi Journal is a biannual English-language publication that covers Sámi culture, history, and current affairs. The coverage also includes the community affairs of the Sámi in North America, estimated at some 30,000 people. Báiki means "place" or "home" in Northern Sámi. It refers to the identity that is always in the heart. The magazine was so named because it was distributed among North American Sámi people, and was therefore meant to remind them of their Sámi heritage and identity.

== History and profile ==
The magazine was first published in 1991 in Duluth, Minnesota. The founding editor of the journal was Faith Fjeld. One of the editors was Nathan Muus. Báiki maintains an editorial office in Oakland, California. Faith was the chief editor for 37 editions of Báiki. After Faith’s death in 2014, her friends and colleagues Nathan Muus, Marlene Wisuri, and Ruthanne Cecil took over co-editing for future issues.

Báiki is a non-profit project of the Center for Environmental Economic Development, supported by grants from the Barbro Osher Pro Suecia Foundation, subscriptions, contributions and advertisements. The last subscription-based issue was released in June 2015. It was a memorial issue in honor of Faith, who had passed in October of the year before. Since then, only special editions have been published. Previous editions of Báiki are no longer in print, however some editions may be obtained from the Sami Cultural Center of North America in Duluth, Minnesota.

== See also ==
- Árran the North American Sámi Newsletter.
- Sami Siida of North America a network for Sámi in North America.
