= Larve =

Larve is a small village in the Pulwama district of the Indian union territory of Jammu and Kashmir. It is situated in the town of Tral. Both Muslims and Sikhs reside in the village. It has many mohallas. It is situated on an edge of a mountain.
