= Peter Lynch (director) =

Canadian film director

Peter Lynch is a Canadian filmmaker, most noted as the director and writer of the documentary films Project Grizzly, The Herd and Cyberman.

== Career ==
Lynch's 1994 short film Arrowhead, starring Don McKellar, won the Genie Award for Best Theatrical Short Film at the 15th Genie Awards.

His feature debut, Project Grizzly, premiered at the 1996 Toronto International Film Festival, and was a Genie Award nominee for Best Feature Length Documentary at the 17th Genie Awards.

The Herd, about the six-year Canadian Reindeer Drive of the 1930s from Alaska to the Northwest Territories, premiered at the 1998 Toronto International Film Festival, and was a Genie Award nominee for Best Feature Length Documentary at the 19th Genie Awards.

Cyberman, about technology activist and University of Toronto professor Steve Mann, was released in 2001. A Whale of a Tale, about Lynch's quest to discover the origin of a whale bone unearthed in downtown Toronto, followed in 2004.

In 2009 Lynch directed four short films for the cross-platform project City Sonic. Lynch, along with six other directors, shot 20 short films about Toronto musicians and the places where their musical lives were transformed. Lynch directed films starting The Barenaked Ladies, Jason Collett, Lioness, and Laura Barrett.

In 2011, he participated in the National Parks Project, collaborating with Barrett, Cadence Weapon and Mark Hamilton to produce and score a short film about Alberta's Waterton Lakes National Park.

Lynch's first dramatic feature film, Birdland, was released theatrically in Canada in January 2018.

== Filmography ==
- Chinese Concoctions Not Good for TV
- Toronto Symphony Orchestra making-of process (1992)
- St Bruno, My Eyes As a Stranger (1994)
- Arrowhead (1994)
- The Artist and the Collector (1994)
- Project Grizzly (1996)
- The Herd (1998)
- Cyberman (2001)
- Soccer Fever—A Passion Play (2002)
- Animal Nightmares (2003)
- A Whale of a Tale (2004)
- Dem Bones (2004)
- Bloodlines (2004)
- Things that Move—Helicopters
- Habbakuk Ship of Ice (2006)
- Who Shot General Wolfe (2007)
- The Archivist's Handbook (2007)
- The Robotic Chair (2007)
- A Short Film about Falling (2007)
- Three Chords from the Truth (2008)
- Trend Hunter TV (2008)
- City Sonic (2009)
- Love Is A Dirty Word (2010)
- Birdland (2018)
