= Port Clarence, Alaska =

- CDP
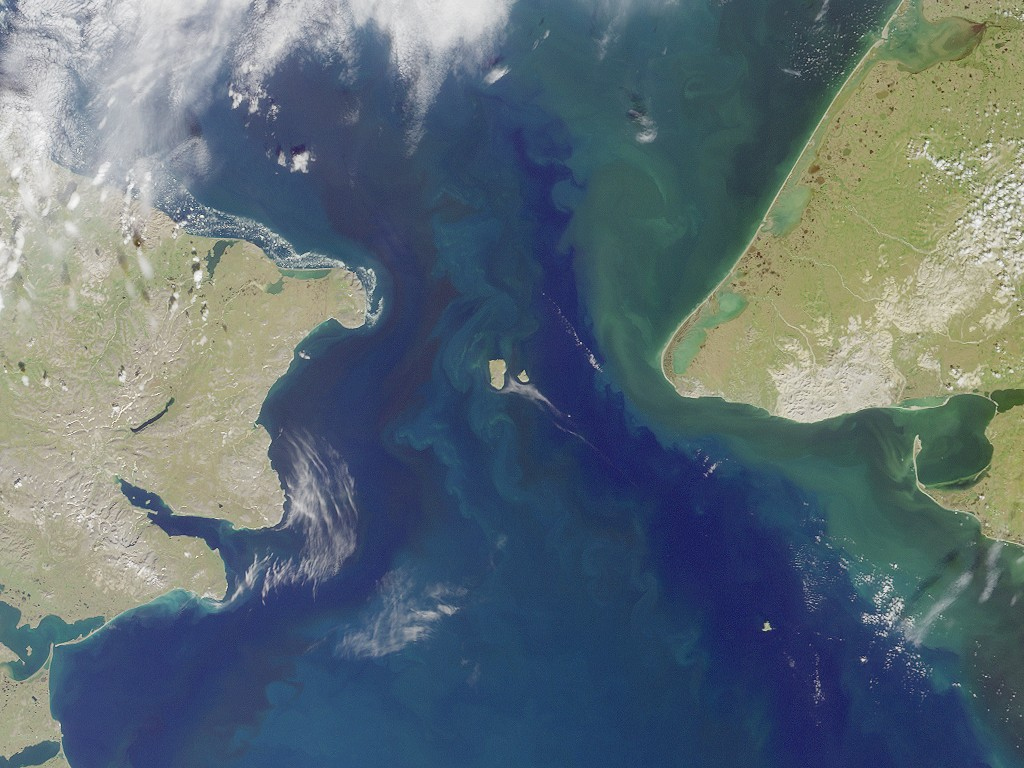
- Bering Strait. Port Clarence bay is the large bight in the southeast.

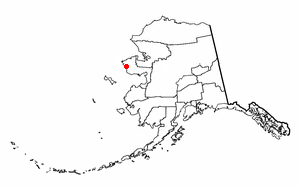
- Location of Port Clarence, Alaska
- Coordinates: 65°15′58″N 166°51′10″W
- Country: United States
- State: Alaska
- Census Area: Nome

Government
  - State senator: Donald Olson (D)
  - State rep.: Neal Foster (D)

Area
  - Total: 35.02 sq mi (90.71 km^{2})
  - Land: 34.05 sq mi (88.20 km^{2})
  - Water: 0.97 sq mi (2.51 km^{2})
- Elevation: 16 ft (5 m)

Population (2020)
  - Total: 0
  - Density: 0/sq mi (0/km^{2})
- Time zone: UTC-9 (Alaska (AKST))
  - Summer (DST): UTC-8 (AKDT)
- ZIP code: 99762
- Area code: 907
- FIPS code: 02-63170
- GNIS feature ID: 1408213

Port Clarence is an uninhabitated census-designated place (CDP) in the Nome Census Area of Alaska. The population was 0 at the 2020 census, down from 24 in 2010. It is located on the spit separating Port Clarence Bay from the Bering Strait.

== History ==
Missionary Sheldon Jackson's greatest success with his Teller Reindeer Station at Port Clarence, figured in the Overland Relief Expedition in 1897 to save marooned whalers near Point Barrow.

During the 1898-1899 gold rush in Nome, smaller quantities of both gold and high-grade tin were mined in Port Clarence.

The Harriman Alaska Expedition visited Port Clarence in 1899, making a photographic record of Alaska Natives.

In 1900, the United States Coast and Geodetic Survey charted the coastline.

From 1961 to 2010 Port Clarence was a LORAN-C station administered by the United States Coast Guard. The LORAN-C Program was terminated on February 8, 2010. The Coast Guard commissioned a 1,350-foot (411.48-metre) tall Loran-C tower at the station in 1961, and it was the tallest structure in Alaska until its demolition in 2010.

== Geography ==
Port Clarence is located at 65°15′58″N 166°51′10″W (65.265974, -166.852765).

According to the United States Census Bureau, the CDP has a total area of 36.5 square miles (95 km^{2}), of which, 35.5 square miles (92 km^{2}) of it is land and 1.0 square mile (2.6 km^{2}) of it (2.74%) is water.

== Demographics ==
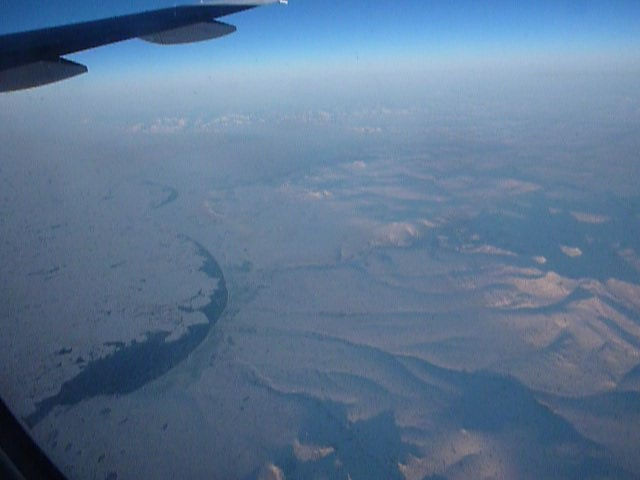
The Bering Sea shore just south-east of Port Clarence

Historical population
Census	Pop.	Note	%±
1890	485		—
1980	29		—
1990	26		−10.3%
2000	21		−19.2%
2010	24		14.3%
2020	0		−100.0%
U.S. Decennial Census

Port Clarence first appeared on the 1890 U.S. Census as an unincorporated area of 485 residents. Of those, 276 were White, 144 were Natives, 62 were "Other" and 3 were Asian. The census enumerators included 11 small native villages of Anelo, Chainruk, Kachegaret, Kalulegeet, Kaveazruk, Kovogzruk, Metukatoak, Nuk, Perebluk, Shinnapago & Toakzruk. They also included the following six vessels that were in the area as well: the whaling steamers J.H. Freeman & Grampus; barques Bounding Billow & Reindeer; and the brigs F.A. Barstow & W.H. Meyer. Port Clarence would not be separately reported again on the census until 1980, when it was made a census-designated place (CDP).

=== 2020 census ===
Port Clarence CDP, Alaska – Racial and ethnic composition Note: the US Census treats Hispanic/Latino as an ethnic category. This table excludes Latinos from the racial categories and assigns them to a separate category. Hispanics/Latinos may be of any race.
Race / Ethnicity (NH = Non-Hispanic)	Pop 2000	Pop 2010	Pop 2020	% 2000	% 2010	% 2020
White alone (NH)	18	20	0	85.71%	83.33%	0.00%
Black or African American alone (NH)	1	1	0	4.76%	4.17%	0.00%
Native American or Alaska Native alone (NH)	0	0	0	0.00%	0.00%	0.00%
Asian alone (NH)	0	0	0	0.00%	0.00%	0.00%
Native Hawaiian or Pacific Islander alone (NH)	0	0	0	0.00%	0.00%	0.00%
Other race alone (NH)	1	0	0	4.76%	0.00%	0.00%
Mixed race or Multiracial (NH)	0	0	0	0.00%	0.00%	0.00%
Hispanic or Latino (any race)	1	3	0	4.76%	12.50%	0.00%
Total	21	24	0	100.00%	100.00%	100.00%

=== 2000 census ===
As of the census of 2000, there were 21 people, 4 households, and 3 families residing in the CDP. The population density was 0.6 inhabitants per square mile (0.23/km^{2}). The racial makeup of the CDP was 90.48% White. 4.76% (i.e., one person) of the population was Black or African American, 4.76% were from other races, and 4.76% were Hispanic or Latino of any race.

In the CDP, the age distribution of the population shows 33.3% from 18 to 24, 66.7% from 25 to 44. The median age was 28 years. The 21 residents counted by the census included one woman and 20 men.

The per capita income for the CDP was $35,286. There were no families and none of the population living below the poverty line.

== Climate ==
Port Clarence has a subarctic climate (Köppen: Dfc) closely bordering on a tundra climate (ETf).

Climate data for Port Clarence, Alaska
Month	Jan	Feb	Mar	Apr	May	Jun	Jul	Aug	Sep	Oct	Nov	Dec	Year
Record high °F (°C)	42 (6)	45 (7)	35 (2)	48 (9)	64 (18)	76 (24)	81 (27)	80 (27)	72 (22)	51 (11)	43 (6)	35 (2)	81 (27)
Mean daily maximum °F (°C)	9.4 (−12.6)	4.7 (−15.2)	7.2 (−13.8)	20.7 (−6.3)	36.1 (2.3)	48.9 (9.4)	56.5 (13.6)	54.2 (12.3)	46.6 (8.1)	33.1 (0.6)	20.3 (−6.5)	10.7 (−11.8)	29.0 (−1.7)
Daily mean °F (°C)	2.8 (−16.2)	−1.6 (−18.7)	1.0 (−17.2)	12.9 (−10.6)	30.2 (−1.0)	43.1 (6.2)	50.9 (10.5)	49.8 (9.9)	41.8 (5.4)	29.1 (−1.6)	15.4 (−9.2)	4.7 (−15.2)	23.3 (−4.8)
Mean daily minimum °F (°C)	−3.8 (−19.9)	−8.1 (−22.3)	−5.5 (−20.8)	5.1 (−14.9)	24.4 (−4.2)	37.2 (2.9)	45.4 (7.4)	44.8 (7.1)	36.9 (2.7)	24.9 (−3.9)	10.5 (−11.9)	−1.4 (−18.6)	17.5 (−8.1)
Record low °F (°C)	−44 (−42)	−48 (−44)	−36 (−38)	−28 (−33)	−6 (−21)	20 (−7)	20 (−7)	25 (−4)	18 (−8)	−5 (−21)	−12 (−24)	−30 (−34)	−48 (−44)
Average precipitation inches (mm)	1.11 (28)	1.47 (37)	0.15 (3.8)	0.46 (12)	0.27 (6.9)	0.70 (18)	0.98 (25)	1.82 (46)	1.48 (38)	0.92 (23)	0.64 (16)	1.26 (32)	11.26 (286)
Average snowfall inches (cm)	4.4 (11)	11.7 (30)	3.0 (7.6)	1.9 (4.8)	0.4 (1.0)	0.0 (0.0)	0.0 (0.0)	0.0 (0.0)	0.0 (0.0)	3.5 (8.9)	5.2 (13)	6.4 (16)	36.5 (93)
Source: WRCC
