= Sheldon Jackson =

American Presbyterian missionary

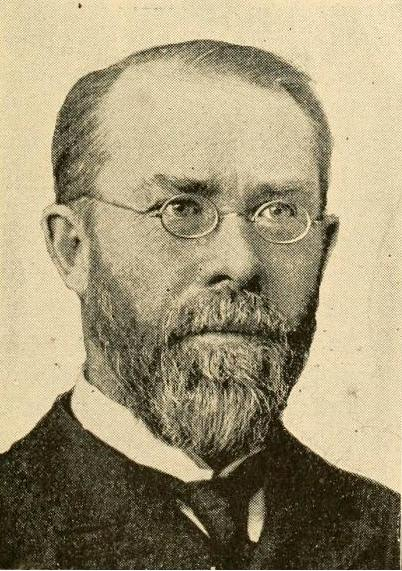
- Jackson (c. 1895)
- Born: May 18, 1834; Minaville, Montgomery County; New York, U.S.
- Died: May 2, 1909 (aged 74); Asheville, North Carolina, U.S.
- Resting place: Minaville, New York
- Education: Union College; Princeton Theological Seminary
- Occupation: Presbyterian clergyman
- Spouse: Mary Vorhees Jackson (married 1858)
- Parent: Delia Sheldon Jackson (mother)
- Relatives: Alexander Sheldon (grandfather)

Sheldon Jackson (May 18, 1834 – May 2, 1909) was a Presbyterian minister, missionary, and political leader. During this career he travelled about one million miles (1.6 million km) and established more than one hundred missions and churches, mostly in the Western United States. He performed extensive missionary work in Colorado and the Alaska Territory, including his efforts to suppress Native American languages.

== Youth, education, early career ==
Sheldon Jackson was born in 1834 in Minaville in Montgomery County in eastern New York. His mother Delia (Sheldon) Jackson was a daughter of New York State Assembly Speaker Alexander Sheldon.

Jackson graduated in 1855 from Union College in Schenectady, New York, and from the Presbyterian Church's Princeton Theological Seminary in 1858. That same year, he became an ordained Presbyterian minister and married the former Mary Vorhees.

He wanted to become a missionary overseas, but the Presbyterian board told the five foot tall Jackson, who had weak eyesight and was often ill, that he would be better suited for duty in the United States. He first worked in the north-central and western United States, which were still vast and lightly populated areas during the American Civil War and thereafter. Jackson's first assignment was at the Choctaw mission in Oklahoma Territory, where he worked until poor health forced him to go back East in 1859.

After his recovery, Jackson was appointed to La Crescent in Houston County in southeastern Minnesota, where he extended his field hundreds of miles beyond the actual station. He spent ten years in Minnesota and Wisconsin, having organized or assisted in the establishment of twenty-three churches.

Jackson traveled as a missionary throughout the American West. With the completion of the transcontinental railroad in 1869, a huge territory was opened to him. In the summer of 1869, Jackson went on a missionary tour using the railroad and stage lines, establishing a church a day.

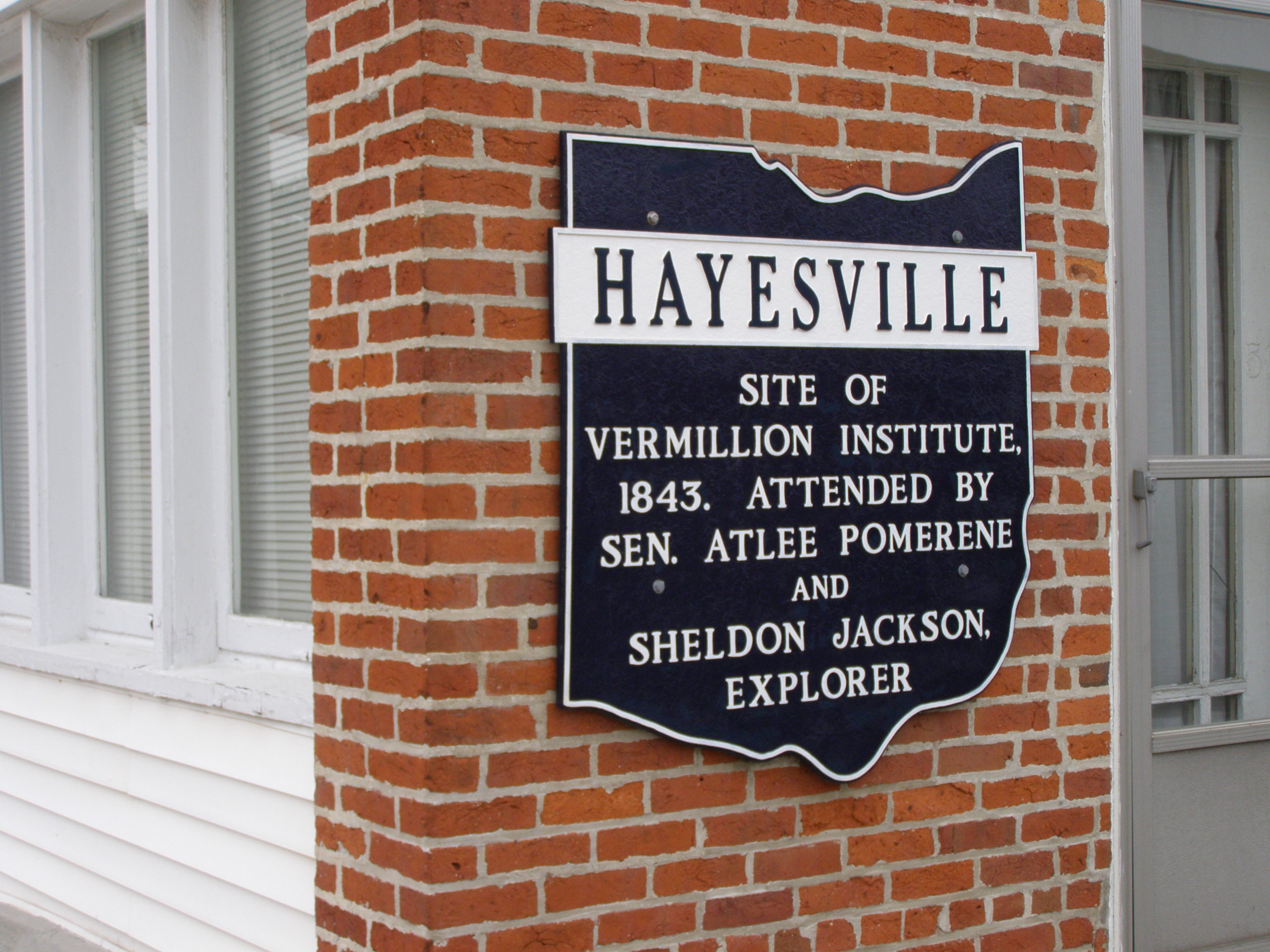

== North to Alaska ==
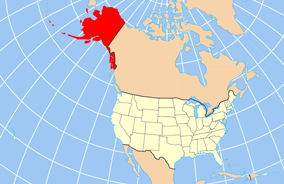
Map showing Alaska position relative to lower 48 states

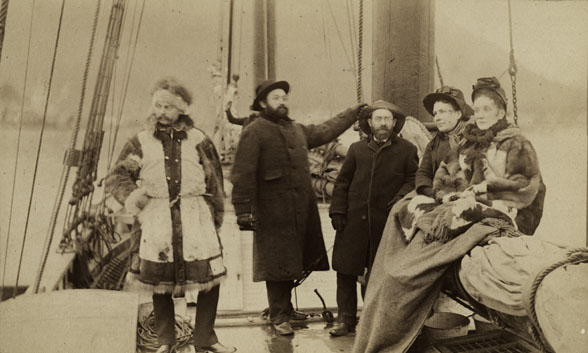
Sheldon Jackson, third from right, on USS Bear (1874)

Jackson found his major life's work in the new territory of Alaska. In 1867, US Secretary of State William H. Seward, during the administration of U.S. President Andrew Johnson, had negotiated the Alaska Purchase from Russia. The huge territory, with 20,000 miles of coastline, was initially called by many skeptics "Seward's Folly".

In 1877, Jackson began his work in Alaska. He became committed to the Protestant Christian spiritual, educational, and economic well-being of the Alaska Natives, according to his conception of well-being. He founded numerous schools and training centers that served these native people. At those schools, however, children were punished for speaking in their native languages. His protégés included Edward Marsden, a Tsimshian missionary among the Tlingit.

Jackson had considerable common ground with another important American in the region. Captain Michael A. Healy of the United States Revenue Cutter Service, commander of the USRC Bear, was also known for his concern for Alaska Natives. During this time, Captain Healy, primarily of European-American ancestry and the first person of African descent to command a U.S. ship, was essentially the law enforcement officer of the U.S. government in the vast territory. In his twenty years of service between San Francisco and Point Barrow, Healy acted as a judge, doctor, and policeman to Alaskan Natives, merchant seamen and whaling crews. His ship also carried doctors and provided the only available trained medical care to many isolated communities. The Native people throughout the vast regions of the north came to know and respect this skipper and called his ship "Healy's Fire Canoe". The Bear and Captain Healy reportedly inspired author Jack London, and are featured prominently, along with Jackson, in James A. Michener's novel, Alaska.

Healy and Jackson became allies of a sort. During visits to Siberia (across the Bering Sea from the Alaskan coast), Healy had observed that the Chukchi people in the remote Asian area had domesticated reindeer and used them for food, travel, and clothing. Recognizing the decline in the seal and whale populations for native consumption because of growing commercial fishing activities, and to aid natives in transportation, Jackson and Healy made numerous trips into Siberia and helped import nearly 1,300 reindeer to bolster the livelihoods of Native people. These became valuable tools in the provision of food, clothing and other necessities for native peoples. This work was noted in the New York newspaper The Sun in 1894.

Jackson was convinced that Americanization was the key to the future of Alaskan Natives. He discouraged the use of indigenous languages, traditional cultural practices, and spiritual celebrations. Because he was worried that native cultures would vanish with no records of their past (a process which his own educational efforts accelerated), he collected artifacts from those cultures on his many trips throughout the region.

Jackson believed he could further his goals for Alaskan Natives through politics. He became a close friend of U.S. President Benjamin Harrison. He worked toward the passage of the Organic Act of 1884, which ensured that Alaska would begin to set up a judicial system and receive aid for education. As a result, Sheldon Jackson was appointed as the First General Agent of Education in Alaska.

== Education policy ==
In 1885, Jackson was appointed General Agent of Education in the Alaska Territory. Concurrent with the values of the expanding colonial administration, Jackson undertook a policy of deliberate acculturation. In particular, Jackson advocated an English-only policy which forbade the use of indigenous languages. In allocating $25,000 of federal education monies in 1888 he wrote, "[N]o books in any Indian language shall be used, or instruction given in that language to Indian pupils." In a letter to newly hired teachers in 1887 he wrote:

It is the purpose of the government in establishing schools in Alaska to train up English speaking American citizens. You will therefore teach in English and give special prominence to instruction in the English language…. [Y]our teaching should be pervaded by the spirit of the Bible." (emphasis added)

The legacy of Jackson's educational policy is clearly evident in the now precarious state of Alaska's indigenous languages. His policy prohibiting indigenous languages in Alaska schools was enforced from 1910 to 1968. Decades of punishment for speaking native languages resulted in greatly decreased transmission from one generation to the next. Several Alaska Native languages, including Eyak, Holikachuk, and Tsetsaut, have become dormant since the implementation of Jackson's language policies, and relatively few Alaskan Natives speak their indigenous languages in the 21st century.

In March 1885, Judge Ward McAllister Jr. ruled that the contracts Jackson had secured with Tlingit parents, giving up their children for a period of five years for a small sum of money, to be null and void. This greatly reduced the number of students at Jackson's school. Jackson repeatedly sparred with McAllister and the district attorney, and mounted a campaign with President Grover Cleveland's family members to have the officials dismissed. The president dismissed them between May and August 1885. In May 1885, Jackson was indicted by a grand jury of Russian-Tlingit creoles, in a controversy over land rights. Jackson then found himself in jail for several hours.

== Death and legacy ==
Jackson died on May 2, 1909, in Asheville, North Carolina. He is interred in his hometown of Minaville, New York.

The former Sheldon Jackson College in Sitka, Alaska, was named after him. The Sheldon Jackson Museum, on the Sheldon Jackson College grounds, is the oldest concrete building in the state and houses much of Sheldon Jackson's collection as well as other examples of Tlingit, Inuit, and Aleut culture.

Sheldon Jackson Street is found in the College Village subdivision of Anchorage, a neighborhood next to the University of Alaska Anchorage campus where the streets are named for colleges and universities (the street forms a loop with Emory Street).

In 1874, while in Fairplay in Park County, Colorado, Jackson built the still standing Sheldon Jackson Memorial Chapel, renamed the South Park Community Church, a one-room Victorian Gothic structure, listed in 1977 on the National Register of Historic Places.

== Archival collections ==
The Presbyterian Historical Society in Philadelphia, Pennsylvania, has a collection of Jackson’s correspondence, journals, photographs, photographs, scrapbooks, notebooks and miscellaneous indices and ephemera. Additional correspondence by Sheldon Jackson is also held at Princeton Theological Seminary.

Jackson’s personal papers include photographs by Eadweard Muybridge and H.H. Brodeck. The Presbyterian Historical Society also holds the Sheldon Jackson Library, which was Jackson’s personal library donated by him to the historical society. The Sheldon Jackson Museum in Sitka maintains three to four thousand Alaskan artifacts collected by Jackson during his lifetime.

== Works ==
- Alaska, and missions on the north Pacific coast (1880; Digitized page images & text)
