= Ellsworth P. Bertholf =

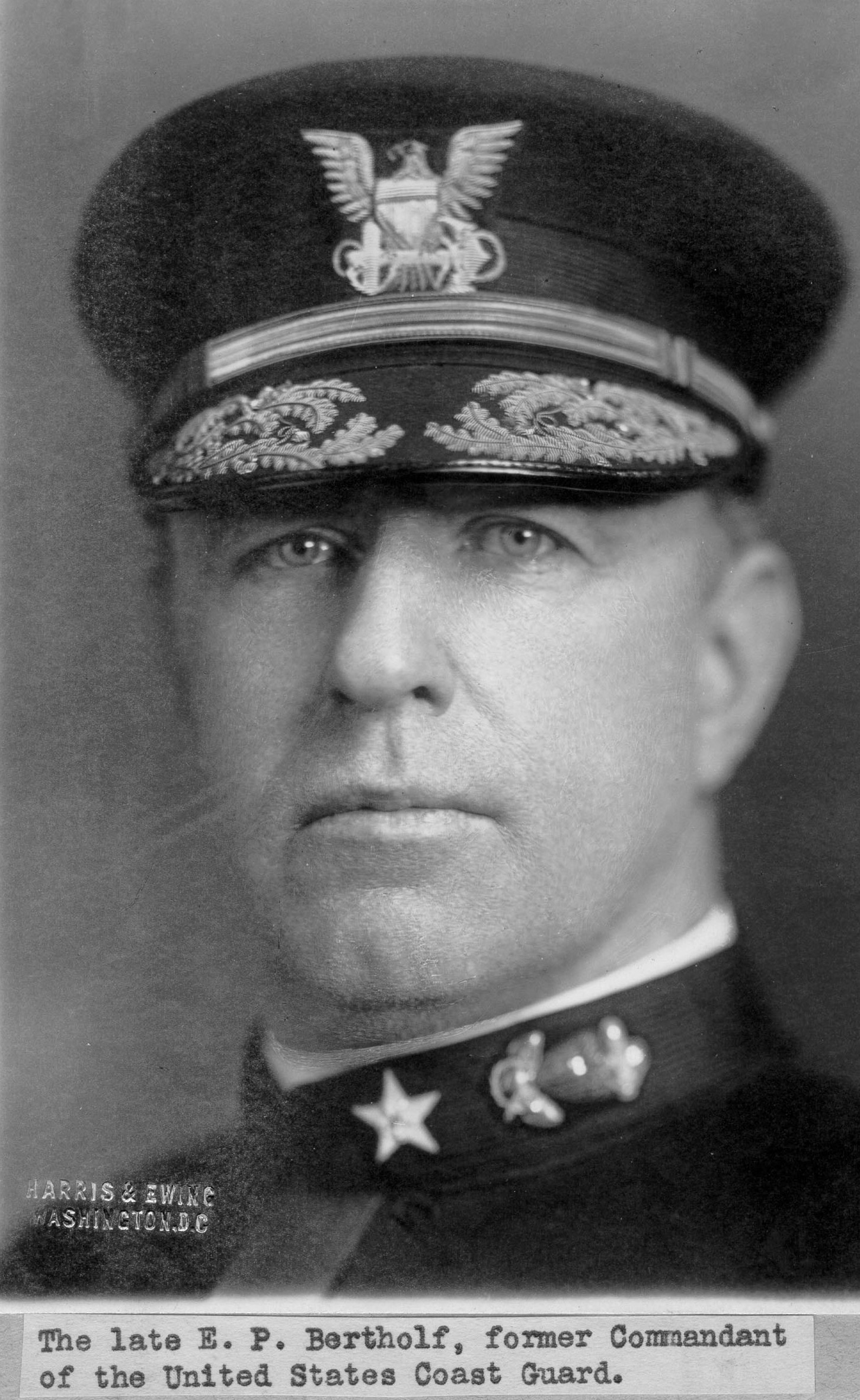
- Bertholf in the late 1910s
- Born: Ellsworth Price Bertholf; 7 April 1866; New York City, New York, U.S.
- Died: 11 November 1921 (aged 55); New York City, New York, U.S.
- Military career
- Branch: U.S. Revenue Cutter Service; United States Coast Guard
- Service years: 1887–1919
- Rank: Commodore
- Commands: Commandant of the Coast Guard
- Awards: Congressional Gold Medal (awarded for Overland Relief Expedition)

Ellsworth Price Bertholf (7 April 1866 – 11 November 1921) was a Congressional Gold Medal recipient who later served as the fourth Captain-Commandant of the United States Revenue Cutter Service and because of the change in the name of the agency in 1915, the fourth Commandant of the United States Coast Guard. His leadership during his tenure as Commandant was critical to the U.S. Coast Guard's survival at a time when outside agencies wanted to either take it over or split its missions up among several agencies.

== Early life and education ==
Bertholf was born in New York City to John J. Bertholf, an accountant, and Annie Frances Price Bertholf. When he was four, his family moved to Hackensack, New Jersey where he spent his school years. When he was sixteen, he received an appointment to the U.S. Naval Academy but was court-martialed and dismissed for allegedly participating in a hazing incident at the beginning of his second year. A year after his expulsion from the Naval Academy, he was appointed as a cadet at the Revenue Cutter Service School of Instruction at New Bedford, Massachusetts. He graduated from the School of Instruction on 18 October 1887 and was assigned to USRC Levi Woodbury on 15 December 1887. He was commissioned as a Third Lieutenant while serving on Levi Woodbury on 12 June 1889.

== Career ==
=== Atlantic area service ===
On 15 April 1890, Bertholf was transferred to USRC William H. Seward, an American Civil War-era side-wheeler that was homeported in Bay St. Louis, Mississippi. Seward patrolled the mouth of the Mississippi River and Lake Pontchartrain, removing hazards to navigation and watching for smuggling activity. In May 1891, he was assigned to the newer iron-hulled USRC Forward, which was based in Mobile, Alabama. While serving on Forward, Bertholf was promoted to second lieutenant on 31 October 1892. In June 1893, Bertholf reported aboard USRC Hamilton, which was undergoing an overhaul at Reeder and Sons Shipyard, Baltimore After overhaul, Hamilton returned to her homeport of Philadelphia for customs duty in the harbor and Delaware Bay. Returning to Forward on 5 May 1894, after only one year of service on Hamilton, he spent just a year assigned to Forward when he received orders to report 1 June 1895 to the Naval War College at Newport, Rhode Island as a student. He gained valuable experience in naval tactics and interacting with Navy officers and became the first Revenue Cutter Service officer to graduate from the Naval War College He graduated in October 1895 and was temporarily assigned as the executive officer on USRC Manhattan, a harbor tug in New York City. Bertholf reported aboard USRC Salmon P. Chase in late November, 1895 as the executive officer of Chase and the Revenue Cutter Service School of Instruction. Chase was undergoing a major modifications in Baltimore to accommodate twice the cadets that it had in the past. After refit, Chase returned to duty as a training ship and spent most of the training year at sea, with only occasional visits in port for reprovisioning and repairs.

=== Alaska ===
USRC Bear

In November 1897, Bertholf received orders assigning him to USRC Bear homeported in Seattle, Washington. USRC Bear was tasked with the Bering Sea Patrol and spent several months out of each year patrolling the Alaska coast. At the same time he reported to Bear, word was received that several whaling ships were trapped in the ice at Point Barrow. The Overland Relief Expedition was planned by the Secretary of the Treasury and Bear left for the Bering Sea facing the Arctic winter, a feat that had not been attempted before. Although Bear was built for working in icy waters, it was not an icebreaker and could not be expected to sail through pack ice to the trapped whalers. Near Nelson Island, the captain of Bear put ashore the executive officer, Lieutenant David H. Jarvis; the ship's surgeon, Dr. Samuel J. Call; and Bertholf with instructions to drive a herd of reindeer overland to the stranded whalers. The distance to Point Barrow overland from Cape Vancouver was roughly 1500 miles. Bear turned back and wintered over in Unalaska awaiting the spring thaw while the rescue party gathered dog sled teams and acquired the necessary number of reindeer. Because of a lack of trained dogs, Jarvis instructed Bertholf to continue searching the Inuit villages for sled teams while he and Call went ahead to Cape Prince of Wales where there were large numbers of domesticated reindeer. Bertholf caught up with Jarvis and Call and helped re-provision the relief mission. The party finally reached the whalers in early March, 1898, walking most of the distance and enduring temperatures as low as -45 degrees Fahrenheit. In 1902, Jarvis, Call and Bertholf were awarded Congressional Gold Medals in recognition of their heroic relief efforts for the 275 American whalers at Point Barrow in what became known as the Overland Relief Expedition. That expedition has been hailed as one of the most perilous rescue missions in maritime history.

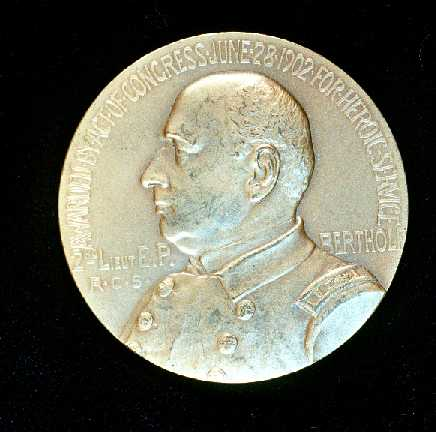
Bertholf Congressional Gold Medal

After a short assignment aboard USRC Thetis undergoing repairs at Mare Island Naval Shipyard, Bertholf was again assigned to Bear in May, 1899, but this time as the executive officer. During this assignment, the crew of Bear delivered more reindeer to Alaska from Russia, enforced Federal law, rescued stranded destitute gold miners from starvation, rescued whalers from a shipwreck and investigated two murders; the Revenue Cutter Service being the only law enforcement in Alaska at the time. During this time Bertholf took the examination for First Lieutenant and was promoted in June 1900. In January 1901, he was attached to the Department of Interior and sent to Russia to acquire more reindeer that were of hardier stock, for shipment to Alaska, for the relief of the Inuit. He was sent to the U.S. Embassy in St. Petersburg, Russia for consultation with Russian officials, and was advised to cross Russia by way of the Trans-Siberian Railroad and contact herdsmen near Okhotsk. After purchasing the reindeer and moving them to the port of Vladivostok, he was responsible for contracting for the ship to transport the reindeer to the Teller Reindeer Station near Port Clarence, Alaska. His next assignment was as executive officer of USRC Manning at Bremerton, Washington where he took part in the Bering Sea Patrol, participating in law enforcement, rescues and hydrographic surveys. He was detached from Manning in November 1902 and managed to squeeze in his marriage to Emilie Innes Sublett of Hackensack while on leave before reporting for his next assignment.

=== United States Life-Saving Service ===
In December 1902, Bertholf reported for duty as an assistant inspector for the U.S. Life-Saving Service in Atlantic City. It was common practice for Revenue Cutter Service officers to perform this duty. This was helpful to him because he could manage to stay close to home, now that he was married. He was responsible as an assistant inspector to examine and drill the surfmen at the 42 life saving stations along the New Jersey shore each month. He also had to investigate any shipwrecks along the coast to see if the rescues had been conducted properly by the life saving stations. This tour of duty with the Life Saving Service would be of valuable experience later in his career when the USLSS merged with the Revenue Cutter Service to form the United States Coast Guard.

=== Command at sea ===
In October 1905, Bertholf's tour of duty with the USLSS was completed and he reported aboard USRC Onondaga as executive officer. Although homeported in Philadelphia, the Onondaga patrolled the Atlantic coast assisting vessels in distress and destroying hazards to navigation. After one year, Bertholf moved across the harbor at Philadelphia to assume command of USRC Wissahickon, a new 96 foot harbor tug. As a new commanding officer, Bertholf had to deal with the international shipping community and assist vessels entering the harbor with finding the proper berth as well as enforcing anchorage and port regulations. This experience in command of a small cutter would be necessary before he could assume command of the larger cutters in the Revenue Service and required tact and good judgment. In August 1907, he was promoted to captain, detached from duty in Philadelphia and assigned to be the temporary captain of USRC Seminole at Wilmington, North Carolina while the commanding officer was on a temporary assignment. During the short assignment, Bertholf was able to use his experiences at the Naval War College in fleet training exercises with several other USRCS cutters in the Atlantic Ocean. Landing exercises utilizing the crews of the cutters were performed at Yorktown, Virginia along with squadron formations and gunnery exercises at sea. After the commanding officer returned to the Seminole, Bertholf was expecting to return to his command on Wissahickon when he received the surprise of orders assigning him to the command of his old ship, Bear. This was a great honor and a great responsibility as the Bear was the most famous cutter in the Revenue Cutter Service. He reported aboard Bear as it was finishing a maintenance overhaul at Mare Island in December 1907 and he was required to move her to another shipyard in Oakland, California to have repairs completed. He was expecting to get underway in the spring for the annual Bering Sea Patrol; but instead received orders to escort the Great White Fleet into San Francisco Bay. Thousands of people came to the port call ceremonies and Bertholf and his crew had the responsibility of keeping hundreds of small craft out of the way of the battleships and cruisers as they made their way to moorings. The whole day came off without a collision or injury due to the diligence of the crew of Bear. Bear, like all of the cutters on the Bering Sea Patrol, had dealt with the problems of pelagic sealing for years by other nations ships in the coastal waters of Alaska. The problem was expected to get worse after the Russo-Japanese War ended and Japan turned its resources back to peacetime uses because Japan was not a signatory to any sealing treaties. During the summer of 1908, Bertholf and his crew were kept very busy; they confiscated two Japanese ships caught sealing within the three-mile limit, and had to transport the ships and crews to Unalaska and testify in federal court. After the trial, Bear was tasked with hauling the prisoners to jail in Valdez, Alaska and didn't make a return to its homeport in Sausalito, California until late November. Other assignments during the three-year tour of duty that Bertholf commanded Bear included hydrographic surveys, shipwreck rescues and transporting 143 destitute men and women from Nome to Seattle. This required a refit of the cutter to accommodate the extra passengers.

=== Commandant of the U.S. Coast Guard ===
In December 1910, Bertholf's tour aboard USRC Bear ended and he received orders assigning him to the command of USRC Morrill, homeported in Detroit. Since Morrill was laid up for the winter, this gave him time to concentrate on his campaign to succeed Worth G. Ross as Captain-Commandant of the USRCS. Several senior captains were actively seeking the appointment and Bertholf was only 23rd on the seniority list. His dismissal from the Naval Academy was the lone black mark against him; however, his Congressional Gold Medal and service as commanding officer of Bear were all points in his favor. An endorsement by Walter Eli Clark, the district governor of Alaska, and Franklin MacVeagh, Secretary of the Treasury, finally helped him secure the nomination to the post. Bertholf was confirmed by the Senate on 15 June 1911 and became the fourth Captain-Commandant of the service. (Note: Kroll, in his work Commodore Ellsworth P. Bertholf: First Commandant of the Coast Guard refers to Bertholf as the first commandant of the newly formed Coast Guard in the title of his book. The Coast Guard in practice refers to Bertholf as the fourth commandant, citing Senior Captain Leonard G. Shepard as the first person to hold the military billet of leader of the Revenue Cutter Service, even though he was never formally known by the title commandant. The first leader of the Revenue Cutter service to hold the title of Captain-Commandant was Bertholf's predecessor, Worth G. Ross. This article and the article Commandant of the Coast Guard follow the numbering convention used by the U.S. Coast Guard.) One of his first challenges was a reorganization of the RCS after the Treasury Secretary directed that operational control of the service's cutters be removed from the civilian Customs Collectors and assigned to the Revenue Cutter Service chain-of-command. This allowed Bertholf reorganize the RCS headquarters staff and to establish district offices in several cities on both coasts for better control of the cutters. In 1912, Bertholf was called to testify at the House Committee on Foreign Affairs hearings on implementation of the North Pacific Fur Seal Convention of 1911, a treaty designed to protect seals and otters from over hunting. His testimony dealt with the RCS role in enforcement of the treaty and how Bering Sea Patrol law enforcement would be made much easier by the inclusion of Russia and Japan and not just the United States and Great Britain.

==== Cleveland Commission and merger ====
In November 1911 the Cleveland Commission on Economy and Efficiency, chaired by Frederick A. Cleveland, President William Howard Taft's chief economic adviser, released a report that called for the dissolution of the RCS and its responsibilities distributed to other agencies in the Federal government. The report stated that the military responsibilities of the RCS should be turned over the Navy and other civilian duties should be shared by several other agencies for a savings of one million dollars a year. Bertholf was faced with the task of organizing a defense against the proposal and with the assistance of the Navy; who didn't want the non-military tasks that the RCS performed, or the 1700 RCS personnel; he started gathering facts about RCS operations that would justify its existence. Secretary of the Treasury MacVeagh disagreed with the conclusions in the Cleveland report and directed Bertholf to meet with Sumner Kimball, the head of the USLSS to come up with a plan to merge the two services. They drafted a bill using the strength of both services to form the U.S. Coast Guard from the two services and presented it to Secretary MacVeagh, who in turn, looked for friendly members of Congress to sponsor the bill. In April 1912 the RMS Titanic, a British passenger ship struck an iceberg in the North Atlantic and sank with great loss of life. To prevent another disaster an International Ice Patrol treaty was signed with several other countries naming the United States as the operator of the patrol. Because the Navy didn't want the non-military duty, the RCS was tasked with the job of insuring that icebergs were tracked each spring and notices radioed to maritime traffic in the North Atlantic. This additional responsibility coupled with the changing of presidential administrations and the beginning of World War I made the Bertholf-Kimball proposal look attractive to President Woodrow Wilson and he sent word to Congress that he wanted the legislation passed that would create the U.S. Coast Guard. Senate Bill 2337, "An Act to Create the Coast Guard" (Public Law 239) was signed into law on 28 January 1915. On 19 June 1915 Bertholf was reappointed for four more years as Captain-Commandant of the U.S. Coast Guard.

==== World War I and the U.S. Navy ====
With the entry of the United States into World War I in April 1917, the operational control of the new U.S. Coast Guard was transferred to the Department of the Navy. Bertholf's responsibilities were to advise the Chief of Naval Operations about U.S. Coast Guard matters and he had administrative control of Department of the Treasury functions within the Coast Guard. An immediate problem he faced was the one-year enlistment period that enlisted personnel served under. Many of the sailors were foreign born and either deserted or were discharged at the end of their enlistment when the war broke out. Others chose to enlist in another armed service where the chances of promotion were better. In 1918 the enlistments were changed to the duration of the war but no longer than three years. The pay and rank differences between Navy and Coast Guard personnel were also a continuing problem for Bertholf during this time and were not completely solved during his tenure as Captain-Commandant. Projects that he had direct supervision over during the war included setting up land communications between shore installations on the Eastern seaboard, enforcement of the Espionage Act of 1917; port security, and establishment of a Coast Guard aviation branch. On 1 July 1918 he was promoted to Commodore, USCG.

Again the country is in a state of war and again the Coast Guard is serving under the Navy, but this time it seems the Navy does not want to turn us loose, does not want us to return to the Treasury Department and resume our normal functions and to that end this bill proposes that the Navy absorb the Coast Guard. The officers and men are to be distributed among the several grades and ratings in the Navy; the seagoing ships are to be turned over to the Navy, and the Coast Guard, thus having been swallowed, will cease to exist.

--- Commodore-Commandant Ellsworth P. Bertholf, USCG,
Congressional Hearing, 6 February 1919.

After the war concluded the Navy found itself losing thousands of experienced officers and men to civilian life and did not have enough officers to fill its authorized billets. The Navy proposed to absorb the Coast Guard and its assets to solve this problem. It was noted by the Navy's Bureau of Operations that there was no source to replace officers except the Naval Academy and the Coast Guard. Since the officers of the two services had worked well together during the war, the Navy saw the opportunity to solve their manpower problems by absorbing the Coast Guard and its personnel leaving to the Treasury Department only the vessels necessary for customs duties and enforcement of navigation laws. Many Coast Guard officers supported the Navy's move to integrate the two services because they faced demotion from temporary ranks awarded by the Navy during the war as the Coast Guard returned to a normal operating tempo. On 14 December 1918 Representative Guy E. Campbell of Pennsylvania introduced a bill to permanently transfer the Coast Guard from the Treasury Department to the Navy Department. During hearings before the Interstate and Foreign Commerce Committee in January 1919 two Coast Guard and two Navy officers testified in favor of the bill. Other testified about efficiencies gained by the transfer. Secretary of the Navy Josephus Daniels was in favor of the transfer because he realized that it was the best opportunity for the Navy to absorb the Coast Guard while it was still operating as a part of the Navy and he testified for the passage of the bill. During a second round of hearings before the committee held in February 1919, Bertholf finally got a chance to testify. Bertholf's testimony before the committee systematically rebutted every argument of those in favor of the bill and helped persuade some members to hold the bill in committee. With the bill stalled in committee, Bertholf retired from the Coast Guard on 30 June 1919. The question of whether the Navy would absorb the Coast Guard was settled when President Wilson issued Executive Order 3160 on 28 August 1919, thereby transferring the Coast Guard back to the Treasury Department.

== Later life and death ==
Following his retirement from the U.S. Coast Guard in June 1919, Bertholf moved to New York City and became a vice president at the American Bureau of Shipping, becoming an influential figure at the institution. Since he had more leisure time after retirement, he developed an interest in genealogy and he researched and compiled a family history. He died of a heart attack at his residence at the Bretton Hall Hotel in New York City on 11 November 1921 and is buried at Arlington National Cemetery.

== Legacy ==
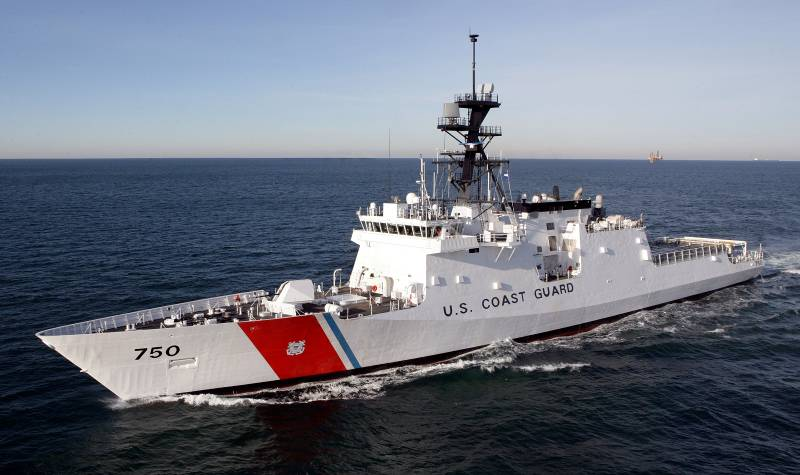
USCGC Bertholf (WMSL-750)

Bertholf's contributions to the U.S. Coast Guard include preventing the dissolution of the service in 1911; his guidance in the merger of the USRCS and the USLSS into the U.S. Coast Guard in 1915; and in 1919, he was instrumental in successfully preventing a takeover by the U.S. Navy.

The U.S. Coast Guard has named the first cutter of the Legend-class maritime security cutters USCGC Bertholf in honor of their former commandant. The cutter is the first ship to be constructed as part of the Coast Guard's Deepwater program and was launched in 2006. Bertholf was commissioned on Coast Guard Day, 4 August 2008, and is currently homeported in Alameda, California.

== Notes ==
Footnotes

Citations

References used

Websites

- "Ellsworth P. Bertholf". Commandants of the U.S. Coast Guard, Biography of Ellsworth P. Bertholf. U.S. Coast Guard Historian's Office.
- "Record of Movements, Vessels of the United States Coast Guard, 1790–December 31, 1933 (1989 reprint)" (PDF). U.S. Coast Guard, Department of Transportation.
- "USCGC Bertholf (WMSL-750)". Welcome Aboard. United States Coast Guard.
- Noble (1990), Dennis L. "Historical Register U.S. Revenue Cutter Service Officers, 1790–1914" (PDF). Coast Guard Personnel. U.S. Coast Guard Historian's Office.

Books

- Johnson, Robert Irwin (1987). Guardians of the Sea, History of the United States Coast Guard, 1915 to the Present. Naval Institute Press, Annapolis, Maryland. ISBN 978-0-87021-720-3.
- King, Irving H. (1996). The Coast Guard Expands, 1865–1915: New Roles, New Frontiers. Naval Institute Press, Annapolis, Maryland. ISBN 978-1-55750-458-6.
- Kroll, C. Douglas (2002). Commodore Ellsworth P. Bertholf: First Commandant of the Coast Guard. Naval Institute Press, Annapolis, Maryland. ISBN 978-1-55750-474-6.
- Larzelere, Alex (2003). The Coast Guard in World War I: An Untold Story. Naval Institute Press, Annapolis, Maryland. ISBN 978-1-55750-476-0.
- Noble, Dennis L. (1994). That Others Might Live: The U.S. Life-Saving Service, 1878–1915. Naval Institute Press, Annapolis, Maryland. ISBN 978-1-55750-627-6.
- Strobridge, Truman R. and Dennis L. Noble (1999). Alaska and the U.S. Revenue Cutter Service 1867–1915. Naval Institute Press, Annapolis, Maryland. ISBN 978-1-55750-845-4.

Military offices
Preceded by Worth G. Ross	Commandant of the Coast Guard; 1915–1919	Succeeded by William E. Reynolds
