= David H. Jarvis =

- Born: August 24, 1862; Berlin, Maryland
- Died: June 23, 1911 (aged 48); Seattle, Washington
- Military career
- Allegiance: United States of America
- Branch: United States Revenue Cutter Service
- Service years: 1881–1905
- Rank: Captain
- Commands: US Revenue Cutter Bear
- Awards: Congressional Gold Medal
- Other work: Businessman

David Henry Jarvis (August 24, 1862 – June 23, 1911) was a captain in the United States Revenue Cutter Service. During the harsh winter of 1897–1898, Jarvis, then serving as a first lieutenant aboard the U.S. Revenue Cutter Bear, led the Overland Relief Expedition, bringing a three-man rescue team with a herd of about 400 reindeer across 1,500 miles of tundra and pack-ice to Point Barrow, Alaska, to bring needed food to 265 whalers whose ships had become stranded in the ice off the northern Alaska coast.

== Early career ==
Jarvis was born at Berlin, Maryland, on August 24, 1862. He was appointed as a cadet to the United States Revenue Cutter Service on May 28, 1881. (Note: Jarvis received notification that he was to report to the Revenue Cutter Service School of Instruction aboard USRC Salmon P. Chase on January 7, 1881 as one of a class of four cadets.) On June 18, 1883, he was commissioned as a temporary third lieutenant and his first assignment was aboard USRC Hamilton, reporting at Philadelphia, Pennsylvania on July 5, 1883. (Note: Third lieutenant was the USRC equivalent in rank to a U.S. Navy ensign.) This assignment lasted a little more than two months as he was transferred from the cutter on September 11 for an undisclosed reason only to be reassigned to Hamilton again on November 24. (Note: It is unknown what Jarvis' assignment was; however, it was common practice in the USRC at the time to send an officer home temporarily if there were no duties for the officer to perform.) While assigned to Hamilton his temporary rank was changed to permanent third lieutenant on December 26, 1883. During the time Jarvis was assigned to Hamilton, her cruising area was from Great Egg Harbor, New Jersey, to Bodie Island, North Carolina, including Delaware Bay. Jarvis was transferred from Hamilton to USRC Stevens based out of New Bern, North Carolina, on June 13, 1885. (Note: USRC Stevens was constructed in 1871 and is not to be confused with USRC E.A. Stevens. According to Canney, E.A. Stevens was broken up about 1872. Accordingly, Jarvis would have never served aboard her. USRC Stevens was constructed about 1871. Records from the 19th century show both vessels as being the same, however construction details differ significantly between the two vessels. Coincidentally both cutters served at New Bern, North Carolina at some point in their career.)

On March 16, 1888 Jarvis received orders that transferred him to the Pacific coast where he spent the balance of his career with the RCS. He reported aboard USRC Bear based in San Francisco, California, for the first time on April 3, 1888. Aboard Bear, Jarvis made the first of many cruises on the Bering Sea Patrol. After his return from the patrol, he was transferred to USRC Thomas Corwin also based in San Francisco on October 18, 1888. Corwin spent the winter patrolling waters near San Francisco Bay and was docked for repairs when Jarvis received orders transferring him from Corwin on March 14, 1889. On January 2, 1890 he reported aboard USRC Rush based in San Francisco. (Note: References used in this article do not indicate Jarvis' assignment in the period March 18, 1889 to January 2, 1890.) While assigned to Rush, Jarvis received orders promoting him to temporary second lieutenant. Rush left San Francisco bound for the Seal Islands on June 5 and returned from the patrol on October 15 at Port Townsend, Washington. While assigned to Bear in August 1891, Jarvis helped load reindeer purchased in Siberia onto the decks of the cutter. The reindeer were transported to Unalaska in an effort to establish a herd and teach animal husbandry to the Eskimo natives. The experiment station was eventually moved to Teller Reindeer Station with the assistance of personnel from Bear. On 18 January 1896 Jarvis was promoted to first lieutenant. (Note: References used in this article do not indicate Jarvis' assignment in the period 1891 to 1897.)

== Overland Relief Expedition ==
USRC Bear

In 1897, eight whaling ships were trapped in an Arctic ice field surrounding Point Barrow, the northernmost point of Alaska. Trapped by ice, the harsh environment, and a dwindling food supply, the whalers had little chance of surviving.

On November 29, 1897, the Bear, commanded by Captain Francis Tuttle, sailed from Port Townsend, Washington. It was too late in the year for the cutter to push through the ice, so it was decided the party must go overland, enlisting the help of natives, stopping by a reindeer station to purchase a herd of reindeer.

The overland trek left from Cape Vancouver, Alaska, on December 16, 1897. The expedition was led by First Lieutenant Jarvis, the executive officer of the Bear; the second-in-command was Second Lieutenant Ellsworth P. Bertholf. They were accompanied by Dr. Samuel J. Call, the ship's surgeon of the Bear, and for part of the way by reindeer handlers Frederick Koltchoff and Alexis Kalenin. They were also assisted by William Thomas Lopp, the superintendent of the Teller Reindeer Station, and Charlie Antisarlook, a native reindeer herder. The distance to Point Barrow overland from Cape Vancouver was roughly 1,500 miles.

The rescue party traveled and carried the provisions using dog sleds, sleds pulled by reindeer, snowshoes, and skis. Because of a lack of trained dogs, Jarvis instructed Bertholf to continue searching the Inuit villages for sled teams while he and Call went ahead to Cape Prince of Wales, where there were large numbers of domesticated reindeer. Bertholf caught up with Jarvis and Call and helped re-provision the relief mission.

The group reached Point Barrow on March 29, 1898, having walked most of the distance and endured temperatures as low as −45 degrees Fahrenheit. Jarvis assumed command in accordance with orders from the Secretary of the Treasury. The expedition brought 382 reindeer to the whalers, having lost only 66. On July 28, 1898, the Bear reached Point Barrow and the expedition officers could rejoin their ship. In spring 1899 Jarvis was promoted to command of the Bear and returned north to pay the Inuit for the reindeer.

== Recognition ==
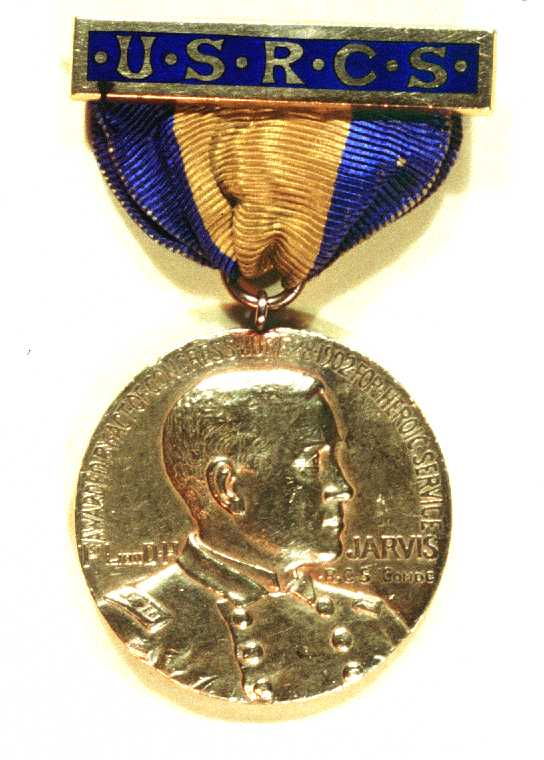
Jarvis's Congressional Gold Medal

President William McKinley recognized the achievements of the rescue in a letter dated January 17, 1899 to the United States Congress, in which he requested of Congress "That gold medals of honor of appropriate design, to be approved by the Secretary of the Treasury, be awarded to Lieutenants Jarvis and Bertholf and Dr. Call, commemorative of their heroic struggles in aid of suffering fellow-men."

In recognition of their work, Jarvis, Bertholf and Call were awarded Congressional Gold Medals for "heroic service rendered" in legislation passed on June 28, 1902. (Note: A Congressional Gold Medal is not the same award as the Medal of Honor.) The enabling statute reads as follows:

Be it enacted by the Senate and House of Representatives of the United States of America in Congress assembled, That the Secretary of the Treasury is hereby directed to bestow a gold medal of honor, of such design as he may approve, upon First Lieutenant David H. Jarvis, Second Lieutenant Ellsworth P. Bertholf, and Doctor Samuel J. Call, surgeon, all of the Revenue-Cutter Service and members of the overland expedition of eighteen hundred and ninety-seven and eighteen hundred and ninety-eight for the relief of the whaling fleet in the arctic regions, in recognition of the heroic service rendered by them in connection with said expedition.

== Later career and death ==
Three years later, Jarvis stood by his post as a special government agent at Nome, Alaska during a smallpox epidemic. In February 1902, he was named collector of customs for the District of Alaska by President Theodore Roosevelt. March 29, 1905, Jarvis was promoted to captain but resigned three months later from the Revenue Cutter Service on June 30 to become manager of a Seattle salmon cannery. He also oversaw the development of the Alaska copper districts and the building of a railroad by a syndicate consisting of the Guggenheim family and J. P. Morgan. President Roosevelt, who had recommended Jarvis for the position with the syndicate, twice offered him the governorship of Alaska.

Jarvis was a close friend and adviser of Judge James Wickersham, who wrote of him in 1901, "I am very fond of Capt. Jarvis; he is a loveable, honest and competent man—I think those three words cover about all that is necessary in a man." When Wickersham ran for delegate to Congress in 1908 on an anti-Guggenheim platform, he broke with Jarvis and accused him of corruption, bribery and other crimes. Jarvis resigned from various offices connected with the syndicate.

Jarvis committed suicide on June 23, 1911, shooting himself in his room at the Seattle Athletic Club, one day after Wickersham demanded a new investigation of him for allegedly defrauding the government on coal contracts. Jarvis's suicide note read, "Tired and worn out." Wickersham, accused by his critics of responsibility for Jarvis's death, commented in his diary, "Poor Jarvis. Until he became the employee of the Guggenheim bunch of Jew thieves he was a man of honor and courage." Captain Ellsworth Bertholf commented, "I lived with him in the same tent, was his comrade in times of hardship and danger... Not many people really knew him, for he was a silent man."

== Legacy ==
- USCGC Jarvis (WHEC-725), a Hamilton-class United States Coast Guard cutter, commissioned on Coast Guard Day, August 4, 1972 was named for Captain Jarvis. Jarvis was decommissioned October 2, 2012 and transferred to the Bangladesh Navy May 23, 2013.
- The U.S. Coast Guard's "Captain David H. Jarvis Inspirational Leadership Award" is presented annually and recognizes an officer that consistently demonstrates outstanding leadership skills which motivate and inspire personnel to strive for excellence.
- Mount Jarvis, a shield volcano in the Wrangell Mountains of eastern Alaska, was named for him in 1903 by F. C. Schrader of the United States Geological Survey.
- Jarvis's Congressional Gold Medal is now part of the collection of the U.S. Coast Guard Museum.

== Personal life ==
Jarvis married Ethel Taber on April 2, 1896. They had three children: Anna (born during the Overland Relief Expedition), David H., and William.

== Notes ==
Footnotes

Citations

Bibliography

Websites used

- "Captain David H. Jarvis Inspirational Leadership Award". Programs. U.S. Coast Guard Office of Leadership.
- "Jarvis, 1971". 378-foot Hamilton Class High Endurance Cutter (WHEC). U.S. Coast Guard Historian's Office.
- "Jarvis Congressional Gold Medal". U. S. Coast Guard Museum Collection. U.S. Coast Guard.
- "Mount Jarvis". Geographic Names Information System. United States Geological Survey, United States Department of the Interior.
- "Public Law 57-192" (PDF). Statutes at Large, Volume 32. LegisWorks.org. Archived from the original on November 29, 2014.
- "Record of Movements, Vessels of the United States Coast Guard, 1790–December 31, 1933 (1989 reprint)" (PDF). U.S. Coast Guard, Department of Transportation.
- "The Work of the Bureau of Education for the Natives of Alaska". Google Books. U.S. Bureau of Education. 1886. pp. 1457–1467.

Publications used

- Bagley, Clarence (1916). History of Seattle From the Earliest Settlement to the Present Time. Vol. 3. Chicago, Illinois: S. J. Clarke Publishing Company. pp. 416–417.
- Canney, Donald L. (1995). U.S. Coast Guard and Revenue Cutters, 1790–1935. Naval Institute Press, Annapolis, Maryland. ISBN 978-1-55750-101-1.
- Evans, Stephen H. (1949). The United States Coast Guard 1790–1915: A Definitive History. Naval Institute Press, Annapolis, Maryland.
- King, Irving H. (1996). The Coast Guard Expands, 1865–1915: New Roles, New Frontiers. Naval Institute Press, Annapolis, Maryland. ISBN 978-1-55750-458-6.
- Kroll, C. Douglas (2002). Commodore Ellsworth P. Bertholf: First Commandant of the Coast Guard. Naval Institute Press, Annapolis, Maryland. ISBN 978-1-55750-474-6.
- McKinley, William (1899). Richardson, James D (ed.). "To the Senate and House of Representatives". Messages and Papers of William McKinley V.2. Project Gutenberg (published December 24, 2004).
- Noble, Dennis L. (1979). "Fog, Men, and Cutters: A Short History of the Bering Sea Patrol". Coast Guard History. U.S. Coast Guard Historian's Office.
- Noble, Dennis L.(1990). "Historical Register U.S. Revenue Cutter Service Officers, 1790–1914" (PDF). Coast Guard Personnel. U.S. Coast Guard Historian's Office.
- Patrick, Bethanne Kelly. "Capt. David H. Jarvis: Undertaking A Daring Rescue At The Top Of The World". Military.com.
- Strobridge, Truman R. and Dennis L. Noble (1999). Alaska and the U.S. Revenue Cutter Service 1867–1915. Naval Institute Press, Annapolis, Maryland. ISBN 978-1-55750-845-4.
- Taliaferro, John (2006). In a Far Country: The True Story of a Mission, a Marriage, a Murder, and the Remarkable Reindeer Rescue of 1898. New York City, New York: PublicAffairs. ISBN 978-1-58648-221-3.
- Wickersham, James (2009). Cole, Terrence (ed.). Old Yukon: Tales, Trails, and Trials. Fairbanks, Alaska: University of Alaska Press. ISBN 978-1-60223-051-4.
