= Lopp =

Lopp may refer to:

- Michael Lopp, represented by the character Rands in the webcomic Jerkcity
- William Thomas Lopp, pioneer missionary in Alaska around the end of the 19th century, active in Native American affairs in the United States
- Lopp Lagoon, body of water in Alaska named after William Thomas Lopp

== See also ==
- LOPP, Polish language acronym for the Airborne and Antigas Defence League in the early to mid 20th century
