= Coast Guard Integrated Support Command =

Coast Guard Integrated Support Command, as a US Coastguard component, could mean:

- Integrated Support Command Kodiak in Alaska
- Integrated Support Command Alameda in Alameda, California
