= Coast Guard Island =

Island in California, United States

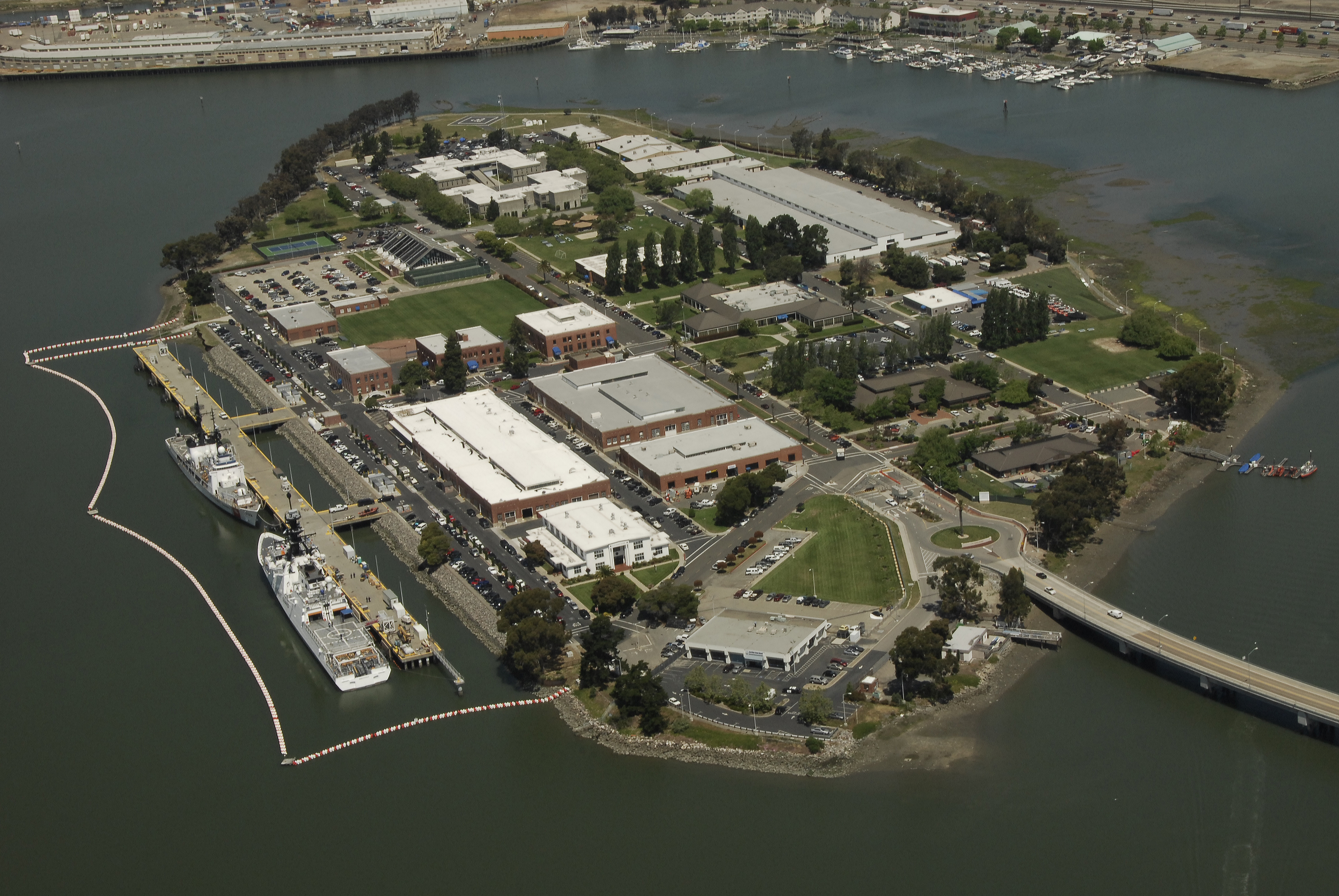

- Location within San Francisco Bay Area Location within California Location within the United States

Geography
- Location: Oakland Estuary
- Coordinates: 37.782553°N 122.249207°W
- Total islands: 1
- Area: 0.271139 km^{2} (0.104687 sq mi)

Administration
- United States
- State: California
- Governing body: United States Coast Guard

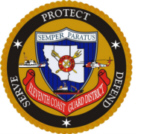
USCG 11th District emblem

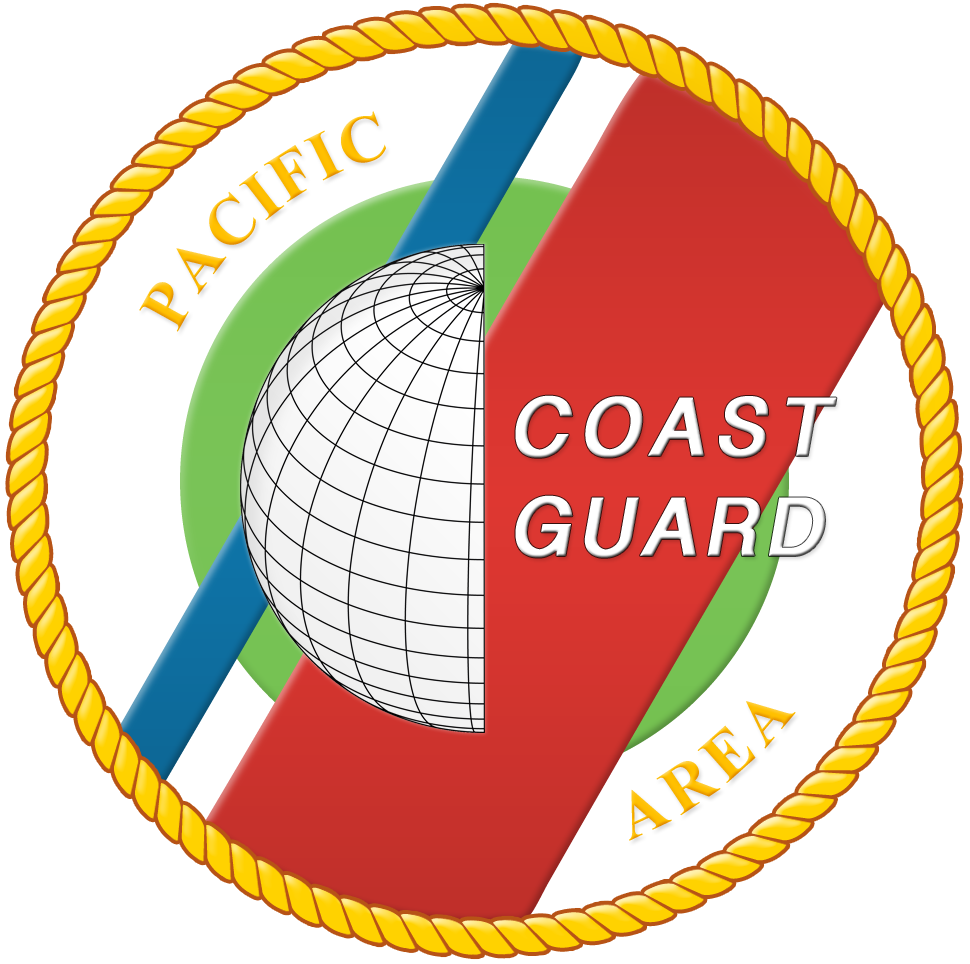
USCG Pacific area emblem

Coast Guard Base Alameda also referred to as Coast Guard Island is an artificial island in the Oakland Estuary between Oakland and Alameda, California. It is home to several major United States Coast Guard commands and cutters, including the Coast Guard Pacific Area. It is one of the largest Coast Guard bases on the West Coast. From 1942 until 1982, the island was the site of the Coast Guard's recruiting training center (boot camp), enlisting and training hundreds of thousands of coast guardsmen including many of the 214,239 who served in the Pacific and European Theaters of the Second World War.

The 67-acre (27 ha) island is situated in the historic Brooklyn Basin, now known as Embarcadero Cove. It is within Alameda city limits, but is tied to land only via a bridge from Dennison Street in Oakland.

== Tenant commands ==
The island houses a number of U.S. Coast Guard commands and its facilities are managed by Base Alameda. Over 1200 personnel are assigned to the island. Area commands include:

- Pacific Area and Defense Force West
- Maritime Intelligence Fusion Center Pacific (MIFC-PAC)
- Sector San Francisco (Prevention Department; the remainder of Sector San Francisco is housed at nearby Yerba Buena Island)
- Pacific Regional Fisheries Training Center (formerly known as Training Team West)
- Maritime Safety and Security Team 91105 (MSST 91105)
- Port Security Unit 312

It is also the homeport for four Legend-class cutters:

- USCGC Bertholf (WMSL-750)
- USCGC Waesche (WMSL-751)
- USCGC Stratton (WMSL-752)
- USCGC Munro (WMSL-755)

Coast Guard Island also houses and supports a number of other Coast Guard commands with detachments or regional offices located on the island, including:

- Coast Guard Investigative Service (CGIS) Pacific Region
- Legal Service Command West
- Personnel Service Center Detachment Alameda
- Coast Guard Office of Civil Rights Detachment Region 3
- Coast Guard Office of Civilian Human Resources (CG-121), Human Resources Operations Division, Human Resources Center-West
- Surface Forces Logistics Center (SFLC) Detachment Alameda
- Shore Infrastructure Logistics Center Detachment Alameda
- Coast Guard Office of Contingency and Deployable Logistics, DOL-42 (Pacific Area) and DOL-43 ((Atlantic Area)
- Atlantic Area International Port Security Detachment Alameda
- Electronic Support Detachment (ESD) Alameda

Coast Guard Electronic Support Unit (ESU) Alameda and Naval Engineering Support Unit (NESU) Alameda were also located on the island until those units were decommissioned in 2013. The functions and capabilities of the units remain as departments within Base Alameda.

The facilities on Coast Guard Island also include an Integrated Support Command (ISC), enlisted barracks, a medical and dental clinic, and public works facilities to service the island.

== History and formation ==
Originally known as Government Island, this artificial island was formed in 1913 by the dredging project that extended the Oakland Estuary to San Leandro Bay. The Coast Guard first came to the island in 1926 when it established "Base 11" under an executive order signed in September 1931 that gave title to a 15-acre (6.1 ha) tract for a permanent base. Improvements were started at that time and by 1933 included streets, utilities, spur tracks, a trestle bridge from Oakland, a transformer station, and rebuilding of the existing wharves. The cost was more than one and a half million dollars and provided facilities for Base 11 and the Coast Guard Store (warehouses).

== Establishment ==
The shore establishment expanded in 1939 with the amalgamation of the Lighthouse Service. A training center was established in 1940 to meet the service's increased personnel needs.

An area of 35 acres (14 ha) was acquired from the City of Alameda in 1939 with an additional 17 acres (6.9 ha) purchased by the U.S. Coast Guard in 1942. The entire island of 67 acres (27 ha) was devoted to training center facilities. The first contract provided for five barracks, mess hall and galley, engineering and administration buildings, an infirmary, roadways, heating, plumbing, electrical and fire protection. The contract was awarded February 21, 1942 and completed June 30, 1942 at a cost of $1,680,082.94. Additional contracts for another half million dollars provided for additional barracks, clothing issue building, paving a drill field, band room, incinerator, anti-aircraft trainer building, and docks for small boats.

== Recruit Training Center ==
The training center was first opened on June 1, 1942, with accommodations for 900 men. It was solely to train recruits. Specialty training was added later to include fireman, signalman, laundryman, radioman, boatswain's mate, cooks and bakers, and port security.

After the war, Government Island remained a Coast Guard Training Center with addition of the Weather Bureau, Internal Auditors, and the Bureau of Roads. During the late 1960s the Training & Supply Center was the Coast Guard's largest field unit on the West Coast. The Training Center graduated 60-100 seaman apprentices and fireman apprentices each week. The Supply Center provided support to the western area districts including Squadron One and Squadron Three in Vietnam. The cutters Taney, Gresham, and Barataria were homeported on the island at the time.

In 1982, the Training Center was closed and recruit training was moved to United States Coast Guard Training Center Cape May, New Jersey, where it remains today. Support Center Alameda was established June 1, 1982 and the island was renamed Coast Guard Island. The Coast Guard Pacific Area, Coast Guard 11th District (then known as Coast Guard 12th District), and Marine Safety Office San Francisco moved from downtown San Francisco to the island. On June 24, 1987, Maintenance & Logistics Command Pacific was established and located on the island until its decommissioning. The Support Center was redesignated as Integrated Support Command Alameda on March 15, 1996, and today is Base Alameda.

== Notable Commanders ==
- World War II Era Rear Admiral A. J. Carpenter, Commanding Officer of Alameda and District 3.
- Vietnam War Era Captain Henry P. Kniskern, Commanding Officer
- Captain Michael L. Woolard, Commanding Officer 2011–2015.

== See also ==
- Islands of San Francisco Bay
- San Francisco Bay Area
- Integrated Support Command Alameda
