= Mount Jarvis =

Mountain in Alaska, United States

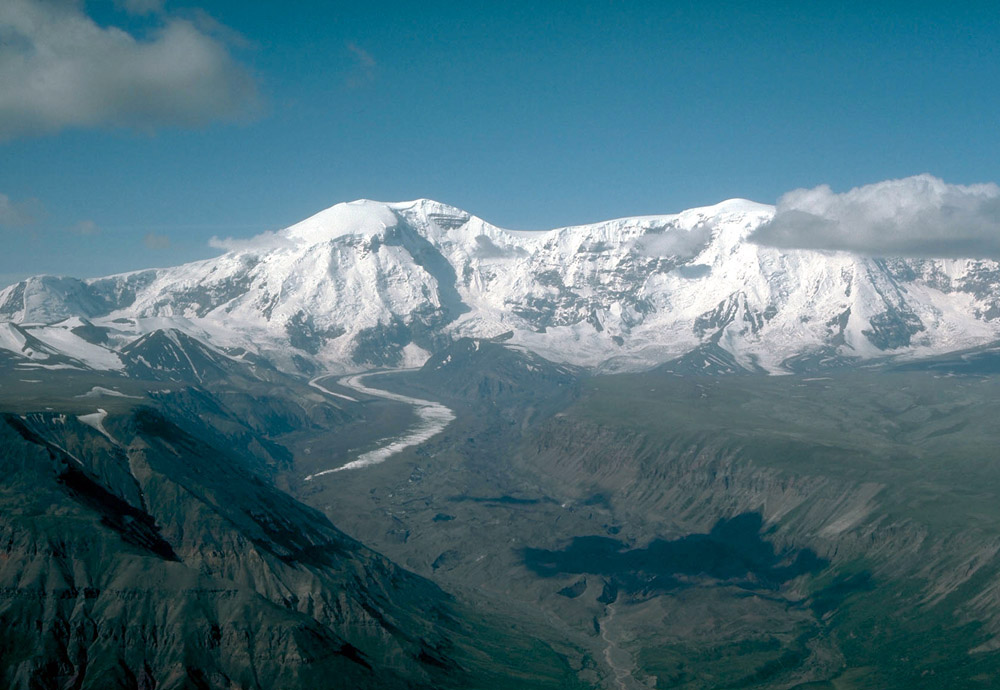
- Mount Jarvis from the northeast

Highest point
- Elevation: 13,421 ft (4,091 m)
- Prominence: 4,721 ft (1,439 m)
- Isolation: 16 km (9.9 mi)
- Listing: North America highest peaks 97th; US highest major peaks 80th; Alaska highest major peaks 20th
- Coordinates: 62°01′24″N 143°36′59″W

Naming
- Etymology: David H. Jarvis

Geography
- Location within Alaska
- Location: Wrangell – St. Elias National Park and Preserve, Alaska, U.S.
- Parent range: Wrangell Mountains
- Topo map: USGS Nabesna A-6

Geology
- Rock age: 1.7 – 1.0 million years
- Mountain type(s): Eroded shield volcano, stratovolcano
- Last eruption: Dacite flow, 1.0 million years ago

Climbing
- Easiest route: Glacier climb

Mount Jarvis is an eroded shield volcano and stratovolcano in the Wrangell Mountains of eastern Alaska. It is located in Wrangell-Saint Elias National Park about 10 miles (16 km) east of the summit of Mount Wrangell. The mountain sits at the northeastern edge of the massive ice-covered shield of Wrangell, rising nearly 5,000 feet (1,500 m) above it in a spectacular series of cliffs and icefalls.

When seen from above, Mount Jarvis is distinctly dumbbell-shaped, with two prominent peaks connected by a narrower ridge. The mountain's main summit is 13,421 feet (4,091 m), making it one of numerous thirteeners (peaks between 13,000 and 13,999 feet in elevation) in Alaska. The second summit is located about 3 miles (5 km) to the north-northwest, reaching 13,025 feet (3,970 m) with over 725 feet (221 m) of prominence above the connecting saddle, thus qualifying it as an independent peak on the list of thirteeners as well. The entire summit area including both peaks and the ridge is covered in glacial ice. The steep, rocky eastern and western faces of Mount Jarvis form headwalls above the cirques of the Jacksina Glacier and Copper Glacier, which flow northward out of the Wrangell Mountains.

Mount Jarvis was named in 1903 by F. C. Schrader, a USGS geologist, for Lt. David H. Jarvis of the U. S. Revenue Cutter Service, who led the Overland Relief Expedition to aid a whaling fleet trapped in Arctic Ocean ice off Point Barrow in 1897–98.

== See also ==
- List of mountain peaks of North America
  - List of mountain peaks of the United States
    - List of mountain peaks of Alaska
- List of volcanoes in the United States
