= USS Miami =

USS Miami may refer to:

- USRC Miami (1862) was a U.S. Revenue Cutter Service schooner-rigged steamer in service 1862−1871
- USS Miami (1861) was a side-wheel steam gunboat in use during the American Civil War
- USS Miami (CL-89) was a light cruiser commissioned in 1943 and decommissioned in 1947
- USS Miami (SSN-755) was a Los Angeles-class nuclear attack submarine commissioned in 1990 and decommissioned in 2014
- USS Miami (SSN-811) will be a future Block V Virginia-class nuclear attack submarine that was ordered in 2021
