= Samuel J. Call =

American surgeon (1858–1909)

Samuel Johnson Call
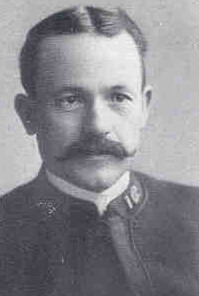
- Photograph of Dr. Samuel J. Call in 1899
- Born: February 1858; Missouri, U.S.
- Died: February 16, 1909 (aged 50) Hollister, California, U.S.
- Buried: Odd Fellows Cemetery; Hollister, California, U.S.
- Allegiance: United States
- Branch: United States Revenue Cutter Service
- Service years: 1890–1899; 1903–1908
- Known for: Overland Relief Expedition
- Awards: Congressional Gold Medal

Samuel Johnson Call (February 1858 – February 16, 1909) was a medical doctor who served with the United States Revenue Cutter Service as the ship's surgeon of the U.S. Revenue Cutter Bear. Call played a key role in the Overland Relief Expedition, traveling across 1,500 miles of tundra and pack-ice to bring food to 265 whalers whose ships had become stranded in the ice off the northern Alaska coast. He was awarded the Congressional Gold Medal and is the namesake of the Samuel J. Call Health Services Center, a U.S. Coast Guard hospital located at Cape May, New Jersey.

== Early life and career ==
Born in Missouri in February 1858, Call grew up in California. He graduated from San José High School. Call pursued a medical career and, by the age of 22, was employed by the Alaska Commercial Company as the surgeon at their Unalaska post. During his five-year tenure, he was the only physician in the Aleutians. As such, Call traveled extensively, providing medical services to various villages from Attu to St. Michael. His interactions with the U.S. Revenue Cutter Service during this period influenced his decision to join their ranks in 1890.

In 1891, Call was assigned to USRC Bear, commanded by Captain Michael Healy. During this voyage, he collaborated with Dr. Sheldon Jackson on a project to import reindeer from Siberia to Alaska, aiming to provide a sustainable food source for indigenous populations.

=== Overland Relief Expedition ===
During the harsh winter of 1897–1898, eight whaling ships were trapped in an Arctic ice field surrounding Point Barrow, the northernmost point of Alaska. Trapped by ice, the harsh environment, and a dwindling food supply, the whalers had little chance of surviving. On November 29, 1897, Bear, commanded by Captain Francis Tuttle, sailed from Port Townsend, Washington. It was too late in the year for the cutter to push through the ice, so it was decided by Tuttle that a rescue party must go overland, enlisting the help of natives, and stopping by Teller Reindeer Station to purchase a herd of reindeer. Tuttle appointed First Lieutenant David H. Jarvis as leader, Second Lieutenant Ellsworth P. Bertholf and Surgeon Call as members of the rescue party. They were also assisted by William Thomas Lopp, the superintendent of the reindeer station, and Charlie Artisarlook, a native reindeer herder. The distance to Point Barrow overland from Cape Vancouver was roughly 1,500 miles.

The rescue party traveled and carried the provisions using dog sleds, sleds pulled by reindeer, snowshoes, and skis. The group reached Point Barrow on March 29, 1898, having walked most of the distance and endured temperatures as low as −45 degrees Fahrenheit. Call attended to the medical needs of the sailors for over four months, helping to maintain their health until the ice thawed and rescue ships could arrive in the summer.

== Later life ==
After resigning from the Revenue Cutter Service in August 1899, Call established a private medical practice in Nome, Alaska, during the Klondike Gold Rush. He remained there until 1903, addressing public health challenges in the rapidly growing community. In September 1903, he rejoined the Revenue Cutter Service, serving on USRCThetis and later USRC McCulloch.

Due to deteriorating health, he retired in September 1908 and moved to Hollister, California, where he lived with his sister.

== Death ==
Call died on February 16, 1909, at the age of 50.

== Awards and honors ==
President William McKinley recognized the achievements of the rescue in a letter dated January 17, 1899 to the United States Congress, in which he requested of Congress "That gold medals of honor of appropriate design, to be approved by the Secretary of the Treasury, be awarded to Lieutenants Jarvis and Bertholf and Dr. Call, commemorative of their heroic struggles in aid of suffering fellow-men."

In recognition of their work, Jarvis, Bertholf and Call were awarded Congressional Gold Medals for "heroic service rendered" in legislation passed on June 28, 1902. The enabling statute reads as follows:

Be it enacted by the Senate and House of Representatives of the United States of America in Congress assembled, That the Secretary of the Treasury is hereby directed to bestow a gold medal of honor, of such design as he may approve, upon First Lieutenant David H. Jarvis, Second Lieutenant Ellsworth P. Bertholf, and Doctor Samuel J. Call, surgeon, all of the Revenue-Cutter Service and members of the overland expedition of eighteen hundred and ninety-seven and eighteen hundred and ninety-eight for the relief of the whaling fleet in the arctic regions, in recognition of the heroic service rendered by them in connection with said expedition.

== Legacy ==
- The Samuel J. Call Health Services Center (a Coast Guard hospital) is named in his honor.
- Photographs taken by Call during his time in Alaska are in the permanent collection of the Getty Museum, Library of Congress, University of Alaska Archives, and Alaska Historical Library.
