= USRC Forward =

USRC Forward was the name of two vessels of the United States Revenue Cutter Service, and may refer to:

- USRC Forward (1842), commissioned as Walter Forward, a 139-ton topsail schooner launched in 1841 and sold in 1865.
- USRC Forward (1882), a 267-ton topsail schooner brigantine steamer launched in 1882 and sold in 1912.

For United States Coast Guard ships named Forward, see USCGC Forward
