= Lopp Lagoon =

Lake in Alaska, United States

- Taziq (Inupiaq)
- Location within Alaska
- Location: Seward Peninsula, Alaska
- Coordinates: 65°43′21″N 167°49′11″W
- Type: tidal lake

Lopp Lagoon (Inupiaq: Taziq) is a tidal lake NE of Cape Prince of Wales (the westernmost tip of the Seward Peninsula) in the U.S. state of Alaska. Many creeks empty into it, but the most water comes from the Mint River. Some salt water from the Pacific Ocean also enters the lagoon through several channels between it and the Bering Strait.

It was named in 1900 for William Thomas Lopp, a missionary among the Inuit and the civilian leader of the 1897–98 Overland Relief Expedition.

Historically, Lopp Lagoon has been an important source of food (salmon and waterfowl) for people living in the Wales, Alaska area.
