= USRC Wissahickon =

Tugboat

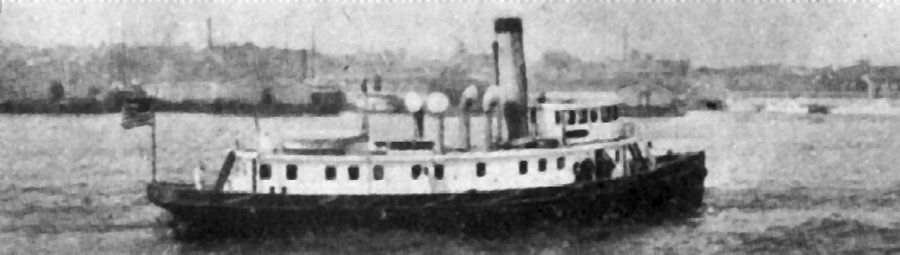
- USRC Wissahickon

History

United States
- Namesake: Wissahickon Creek
- Builder: Spedden Company, Baltimore, Maryland
- Cost: $69,800
- Launched: 11 June 1904
- Commissioned: 3 December 1904
- Decommissioned: 8 May 1935
- Fate: Sold
- Notes: As USCGC Wissahickon after 30 January 1915

General characteristics
- Class & type: Winnisimmet-class
- Type: harbor tug
- Displacement: 194 tons
- Length: 96 ft 6 in (29.41 m)
- Beam: 20 ft 6 in (6.25 m)
- Draft: 9 ft (2.7 m)
- Installed power: Babcock & Wilcox water boiler, steam engine, 500 SHP
- Propulsion: 1 screw
- Speed: 12 knots (max)
- Complement: 11
- Armament: none

USRC Wissahickon was one of two Winnisimmet-class harbor tugs constructed by Spedden Company for the Revenue Cutter Service. She was initially stationed at Philadelphia, Pennsylvania. Ellsworth P. Bertholf served as captain of her from 9 November 1906 to 20 September 1907 in his first tour as a commanding officer. Bertholf would later serve as the Commandant of the Coast Guard. After the U.S. Coast Guard was formed in 1915, she was known as USCGC Wissahickon. In 1916, she was transferred to Baltimore, Maryland. The Navy assumed control of her from 6 April 1917 to 28 August 1919 during World War I. On 1 January 1923 she was transferred from Baltimore to New York City, where she remained in service until being decommissioned on 8 May 1935. On 8 May 1935 Wissahickon was decommissioned and later sold.

== References used ==
- "Record of Movements, Vessels of the United States Coast Guard, 1790–December 31, 1933" (PDF). Historic Documents. U.S. Coast Guard Historian's Office.
- Canney, Donald L. (1995). U.S. Coast Guard and Revenue Cutters, 1790–1935. Naval Institute Press, Annapolis, Maryland. ISBN 978-1-55750-101-1.
- King, Irving H. (1996). The Coast Guard Expands, 1865–1915: New Roles, New Frontiers. Naval Institute Press, Annapolis, Maryland. ISBN 978-1-55750-458-6.
- Kroll, C. Douglas (2002). Commodore Ellsworth P. Bertholf: First Commandant of the Coast Guard. Naval Institute Press, Annapolis, Maryland. ISBN 978-1-55750-474-6.
