= Integrated Support Command Alameda =

US Coast Guard base in Alameda, California

Coordinates: 37.782553°N 122.249207°W

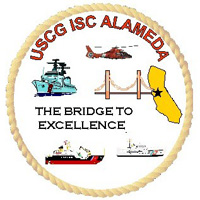
ISC Alameda logo

Integrated Support Command Alameda (ISC Alameda) is a large operating base of the United States Coast Guard, located on Coast Guard Island in Alameda, California Now known as Base Alameda

ISC Alameda provides a wide variety of services in direct support of Coast Guard activities throughout the west coast of the United States of America. Among these are the management of approximately 1200 Coast Guard owned housing units, warehousing, health care services, work-life services, transportation of household goods, and personnel support services. Facilities maintenance is provided to all tenant commands on Coast Guard Island and industrial support is provided throughout the West Coast.

ISC Alameda is home to a variety of tenant commands including:

- Commander, Pacific Area
- Commander, Maintenance & Logistics Command Pacific
- District 11
- Sector San Francisco
- Training Team One
- Naval Engineering Support Unit Alameda
- Electronics Support Unit Alameda
- Coast Guard Island, where ISC Alameda is located, is also homeport for three National Security Cutters.
  - USCGC Bertholf (WMSL-750)
  - USCGC Waesche (WMSL-751)
  - USCGC Stratton (WMSL-752)

== History ==
When opened in 1913 it was known as Government Island. The island was an artificially made by dredging the Oakland Estuary and place the mud into San Leandro Bay. The Coast Guard opened the base in 1926. In 1933 major improvements were added to the base. In 1939 a lighthouse was added to the island. For training men for World War II a training center for 900 men was built in 1940 for a total of 67 acres. Training Center was closed in 1982 and training moved to e Cape May, New Jersey. Government Island was renamed Coast Guard Island in 1982 and Pacific Area Command, Twelfth Coast Guard District, and Marine Safety Office San Francisco Bay moved on to the Island. The Maintenance & Logistics Command Pacific started operation on the Island is 1987. The base was renamed Integrated Support Command Alameda on March 15, 1996.
