= Mint River =

Coordinates: 65.742°N 167.500°W

Mint River (Inupiaq: Kurgam aġua) is a waterway in the U.S. state of Alaska. It rises in the York Mountains, north of the source of the Anikovik River. It reaches the ocean through Lopp Lagoon that extends about 20 miles (32 km) to the east from Cape Prince of Wales. In its upper course, it has a narrow valley. Near the sea, it winds for about 10 miles (16 km) across the tundra.
