= USRC Forward (1882) =

Ship of the U.S. Revenue Cutter Service

History

United States
- Name: USRC Forward
- Namesake: Walter Forward, 15th United States Secretary of the Treasury
- Operator: U.S. Revenue Cutter Service
- Awarded: 17 November 1881
- Builder: Pusey & Jones, Wilmington, Delaware
- Cost: US$72,750
- Commissioned: 1 November 1882
- Decommissioned: 19 August 1912
- Out of service: 2 July 1888–19 June 1890, repairs; 14 November 1905–17 August 1907, repairs
- Fate: Sold for US$4,151, 24 October 1912

General characteristics
- Class & type: Topsail schooner/ Brigantine steamer
- Displacement: 267 tons
- Length: 155 ft (47 m)
- Beam: 25 ft (7.6 m)
- Draft: 7 ft 6 in (2.29 m)
- Propulsion: 2-cylinder steam engine, 24 in (0.61 m) diameter x 28 in (0.71 m) stroke, 2 screws
- Complement: 7 officers, 31 enlisted
- Armament: 2 guns of unknown type and caliber

USRC Forward (Note: The cutter was actually commissioned as USRC Walter Forward but in usage was referred to as USRC Forward by the RCS and by ship history researchers since her commission.)was a revenue cutter constructed for the U.S. Revenue Cutter Service in 1882 by Pusey & Jones shipyard in Wilmington, Delaware. She was the second Revenue Cutter Service vessel named Forward and was named for Walter Forward, the fifteenth United States Secretary of the Treasury. The iron-hulled vessel originally cost US$72,750 and was powered by a two-cylinder steam engine with a topsail schooner brigantine sail pattern. Although Forward was considered a model ship at the time of its construction, it was severely underpowered and had unreliable machinery. The cost of repairs in the first fifteen years of operation was US$52,000.

== History ==
Her homeport from her commissioning on 1 November 1882 to 1904 was Mobile, Alabama where she patrolled the Gulf of Mexico enforcing customs laws and assisting mariners in distress. During this period she was temporarily assigned to several other areas along the Atlantic coast and the Gulf of Mexico. (Note: Future Commandant of the Coast Guard, Ellsworth P. Bertholf was an officer assigned to Forward from May 1891 to June 1893, during which time he was promoted to second lieutenant.) After undergoing repairs in Baltimore, Maryland from 1888 to 1890 her homeport was at Key West, Florida and she gained the mission of preventing smuggling of men, guns and ammunition into Cuba. In 1895 Secretary of the Treasury John G. Carlisle assigned Forward and seven other cutters to enforce United States neutrality in Cuba's revolt against Spain. The cutters were responsible for patrolling the Florida Strait and prevent attempts to smuggle arms into Cuba from the United States. On 5 December 1895, Forward and USRC Winona discovered a recently abandoned camp at Middle Cape Sable, Florida that had enough army and medical supplies to indicate that about fifty men had been training there. In 1898, Charleston, South Carolina was homeport until she returned to Key West in 1904. On 27 May 1902 she was involved in a minor collision with SS Martha Helen in Winyah Bay, South Carolina receiving minor damage. On 2 June 1905 she was assigned to convoy Marine Hospital Service barge Senator from Havana, Cuba to Key West, Florida. On 14 November 1905 Forward was placed out of commission at the Revenue Service Yard at Baltimore for repairs and the crew was transferred to other cutters. The crew of USRC Fessenden reported aboard Forward on 7 August 1907 and she was recommissioned 17 August. On 12 October 1907 Forward received orders to report to Chesapeake Bay for joint drills and inspections with other cutters of the service. In September 1908, Forward was ordered to report to the Collector of Customs at Tampa, Florida to investigate sponge smuggling. In 1909, she was tasked with towing Marine Hospital Service Steamer McAdam from Knights Bay to Key West and Marine Hospital Service barge Senator from Key West to Knights Bay. She searched for the missing schooner Albert B. Mills and assisted her before reporting to Mobile. On 20 June 1910 Forward was ordered to "enforce law among sponge fishermen" near Tampa, Florida On 19 October 1910 she was involved in the search for the overdue tug Jones off the Florida coast. On 27 July 1912 Forward was ordered to the Revenue Service Yard at Baltimore and her crew was transferred to USRC Miami and she was decommissioned on 19 August 1912. Forward was sold on 24 October to Boston Iron and Metal Co. for US$4,151.

== Notes ==
Footnotes

Citations

References used

- This article incorporates text from the public domain Dictionary of American Naval Fighting Ships.
- "Annual report of the Supervising Inspector-general Steamboat-inspection Service, Year ending June 30, 1903". Washington, D.C.: Government Printing Office. 1903.
- "Record of Movements, Vessels of the United States Coast Guard, 1790–December 31, 1933 (1989 reprint)" (PDF). U.S. Coast Guard Historian's Office.
- Canney, Donald L. (1995). U.S. Coast Guard and Revenue Cutters, 1790–1935. Naval Institute Press, Annapolis, Maryland. ISBN 978-1-55750-101-1.
- King, Irving H. (1996). The Coast Guard Expands, 1865–1915: New Roles, New Frontiers. Naval Institute Press, Annapolis, Maryland. ISBN 978-1-55750-458-6.
- Kroll, C. Douglas (2002). Commodore Ellsworth P. Bertholf: First Commandant of the Coast Guard. Naval Institute Press, Annapolis, Maryland. ISBN 978-1-55750-474-6.
