= USCGC Bertholf =

Legend-class U.S. Coast Guard cutter

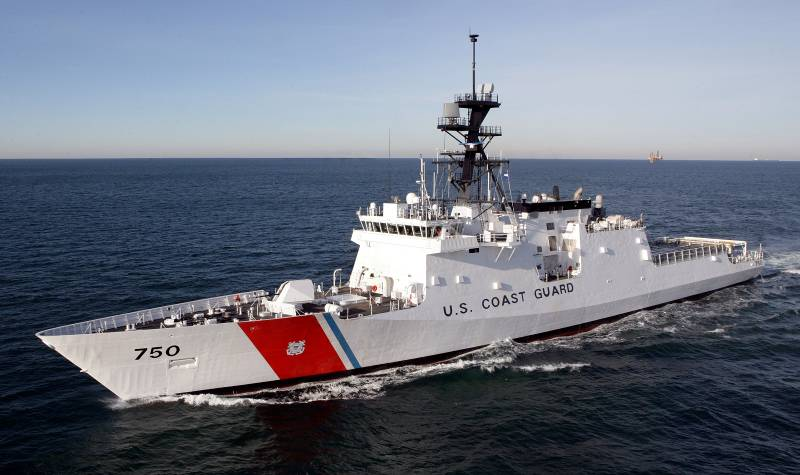
- USCGC Bertholf (WMSL-750)

History

United States
- Namesake: Commodore Ellsworth P. Bertholf, USCG
- Ordered: January 2001
- Builder: Northrop Grumman Ship Systems, Pascagoula, Mississippi, U.S.
- Cost: US$641 million
- Laid down: March 29, 2005
- Launched: September 29, 2006
- Christened: November 11, 2006
- Commissioned: August 4, 2008
- Home port: Integrated Support Command Alameda
- Identification: MMSI number: 369980000; Callsign: NBCQ
- Motto: "Legends Begin Here"
- Status: In active service
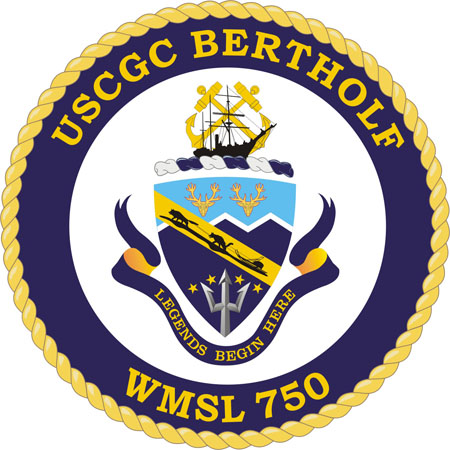
- Badge

General characteristics
- Displacement: 4500 LT
- Length: 418 feet (127 meters)
- Beam: 54 feet (16 meters)
- Draft: 22.5 feet (6.9 meters)
- Propulsion: Combined diesel and gas; 2 × 7.400 kW diesel engines; 1 × 22.000 kW gas turbine engine
- Speed: 28+ knots
- Range: 12,000 nm
- Complement: 113 (14 officers + 99 enlisted) and can carry up to 167 depending on mission
- Sensors & processing systems: EADS 3D TRS-16 AN/SPS-75 Air Search Radar; SPQ-9B Fire Control Radar; AN/SPS-73 Surface Search Radar; AN/SLQ-32
- Electronic warfare & decoys: AN/SLQ-32 Electronic Warfare System; 2 SRBOC/ 2 x NULKA countermeasures chaff/rapid decoy launcher
- Armament: 1 x MK 110 57mm gun a variant of the Bofors 57 mm gun and Gunfire Control System; 1 × 20 mm Block 1B Phalanx Close-In Weapons System; 4 × .50 caliber machine guns; 2 × M240B 7.62 mm machine guns
- Armor: Ballistic protection for main gun
- Aircraft carried: 2 x MH-65C Dolphin MCH, or 4 x VUAV or 1 x MH-65C Dolphin MCH and 2 x VUAV
- Aviation facilities: 50-by-80-foot (15 m × 24 m) flight deck, hangar for all aircraft

USCGC Bertholf (WMSL-750) is the first Legend-class maritime security cutter of the United States Coast Guard. She is named for Commodore Ellsworth P. Bertholf, fourth commandant of both the Revenue Cutter Service and Coast Guard.

In 2005, construction began at Northrop Grumman's Ship Systems Ingalls Shipyard in Pascagoula, Mississippi. She was launched on September 29, 2006, christened November 11, 2006, and commissioned on August 4, 2008. The cutter's home port is Alameda, California. Bertholf was the first to fire the Bofors 57 mm gun aboard a U.S. vessel on 11 February 2008.

== Operational history ==
On March 3, 2016, Bertholf responded to a sighting off the Pacific Coast of Panama of a semi-submersible narco-submarine, reported by a P-3 Orion. The semi-submersible surrendered to a boarding party launched from Bertholf, and four suspects were captured along with 6 tons of cocaine. The boarding party then sank the semi-submersible. During the 2012 RIMPAC exercises Bertholf detected and tracked missile threats and also provided naval gunfire support for troops ashore during the training exercise, demonstrating the capability of moving with other naval forces and being able to perform other defense operations.

On 25 March 2019, USS Curtis Wilbur (DDG-54), in concert with Bertholf transited the contested Taiwan Strait. On 15 April of same year, the ship visited Hong Kong, the first Coast Guard vessel to do so in seventeen years.

== Legend-class cutter ==
Bertholf is the lead ship of the Legend-class cutter design and the first large ship to be built under the Coast Guard's multi-year Deepwater acquisitions project. The NSCs replaced the fleet's aging 1960s-era 378-foot Hamilton-class cutters.

== Features ==
- Automated weapon systems
- Medium-caliber deck gun (57 mm) capable of stopping rogue merchant vessels far from shore
- Helicopter launch and recovery pad with rail-based aircraft retrieval system and two aircraft hangars
- Stern launching ramp for small boat launch and recovery
- Bow thruster
- State-of-the-art C4ISR improving interoperability between Coast Guard and Department of Defense assets
- Detection and defense capabilities against chemical, biological, or radiological attack
- Advanced sensors for intelligence collection and sharing
- Real-time tracking and seamless common operational picture/maritime domain awareness via integration with Rescue 21
- Advanced state-of-the-art Ships Integrated Control System (machinery control, steering, navigation) for reduced manpower requirements and improved automation
- Cassidian (EADS) TRS-3D/16-ES air search radar for area surveillance
- The cutter can have an anti-terrorism/force protection suite that will include underwater sonar that will allow the cutter to scan ports, approaches, facilities and high-value assets for underwater mines and mine-like devices and detect swimmers.

== Gallery ==
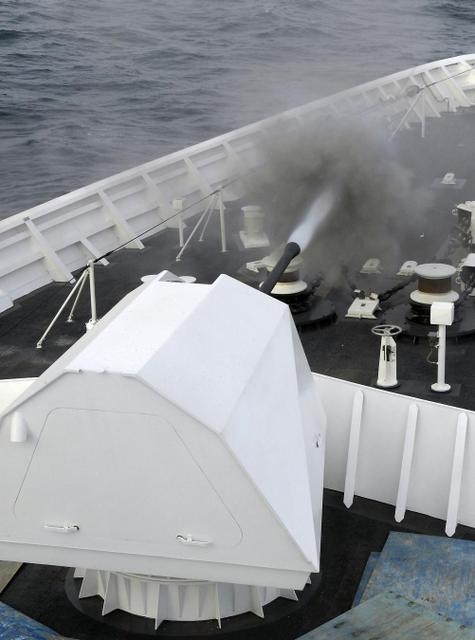
Test firing of the MK110 57mm gun aboard USCGC Bertholf.

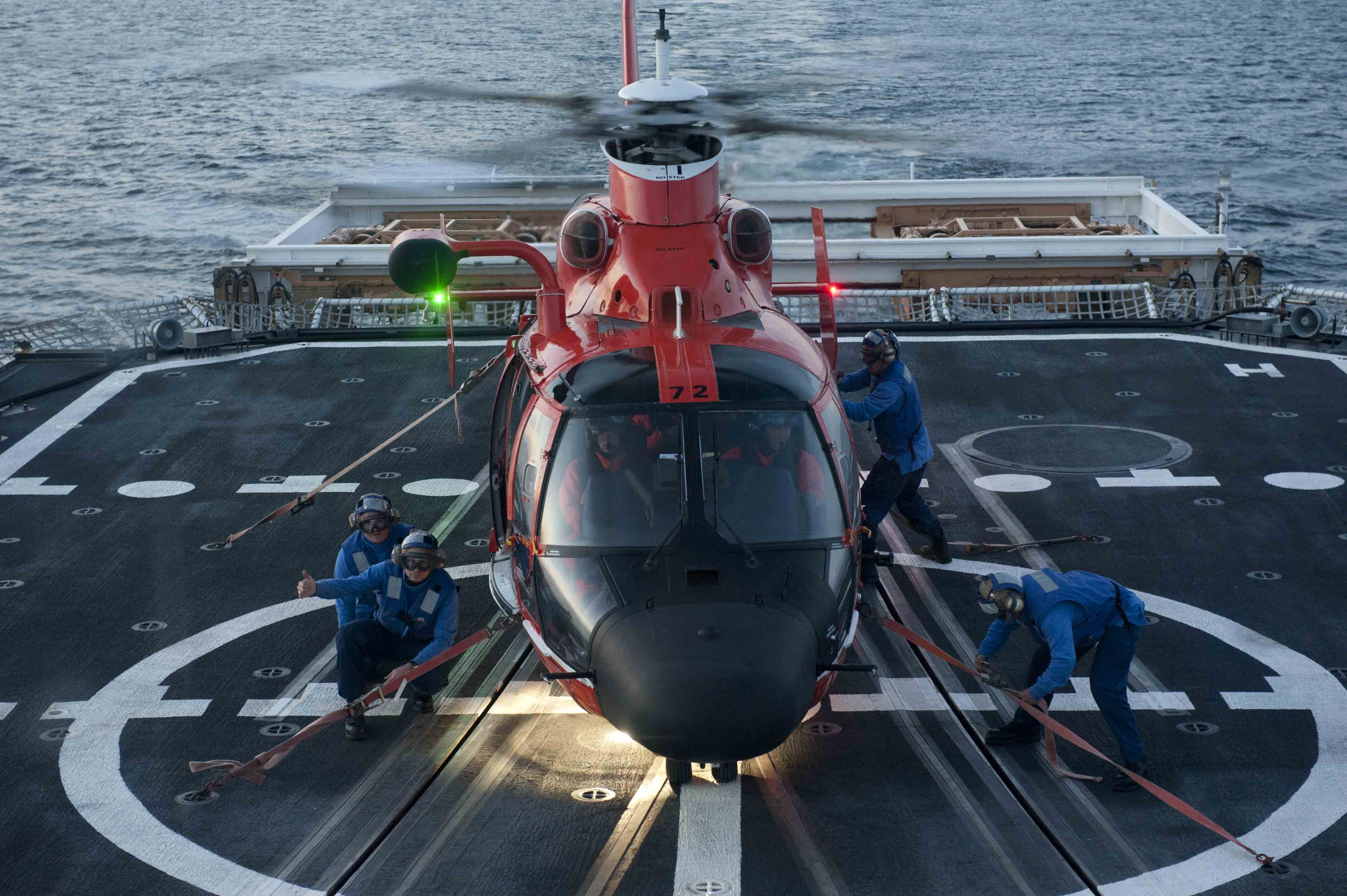
Flight deck crew members aboard Bertholf tie down an MH-65 Dolphin helicopter.

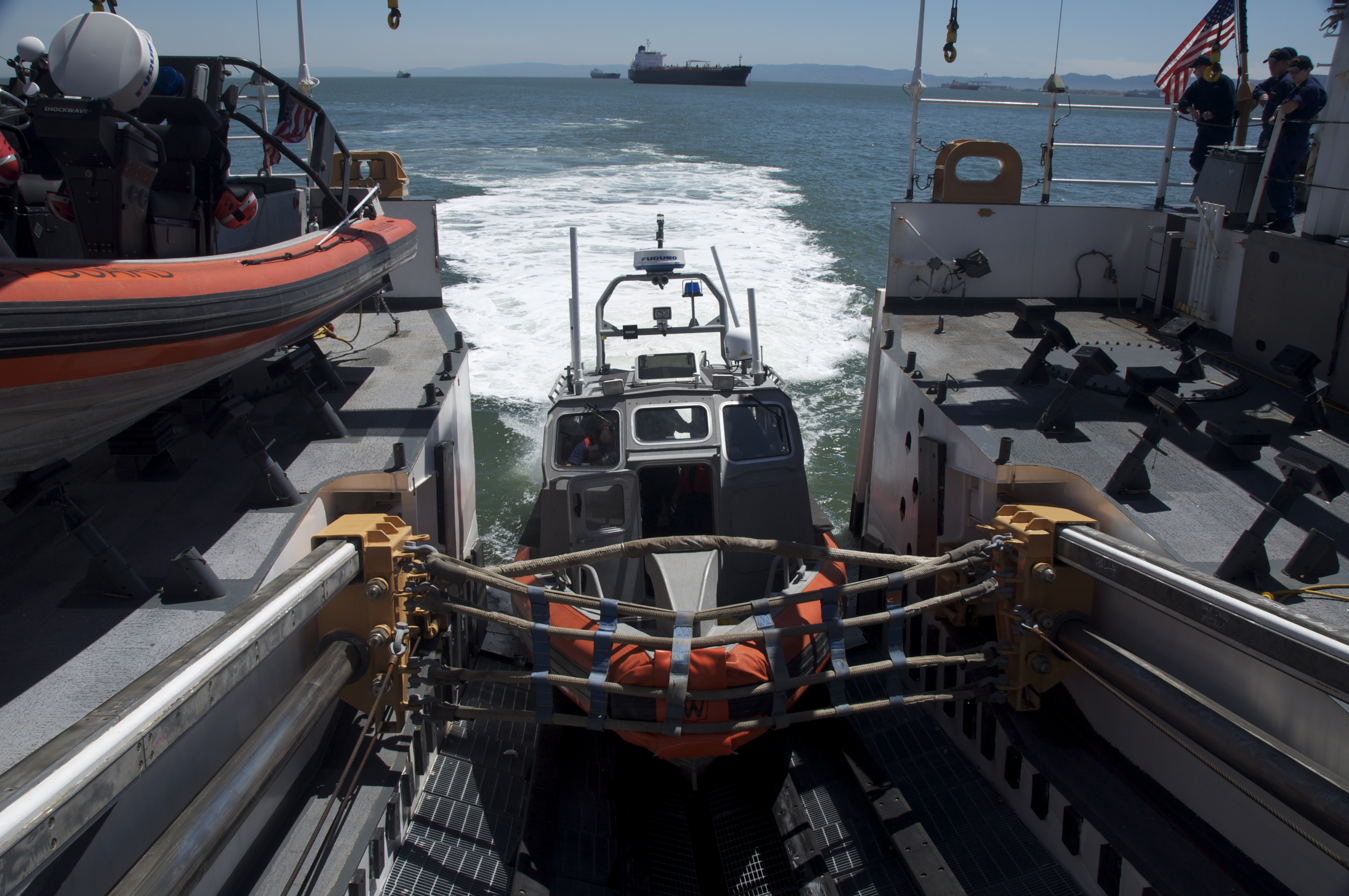
USCG long range interceptor using the stern launching ramp of the USCGC Bertholf.

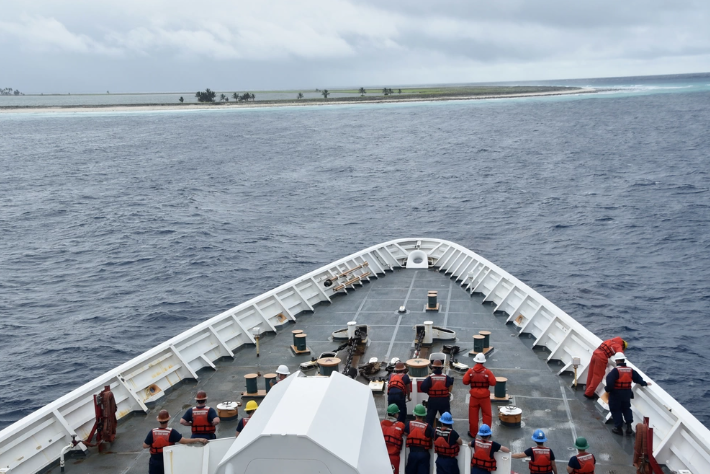
Approaching Clipperton Island
