= Valley City, Indiana =

Unincorporated community in Indiana, United States

- Unincorporated community
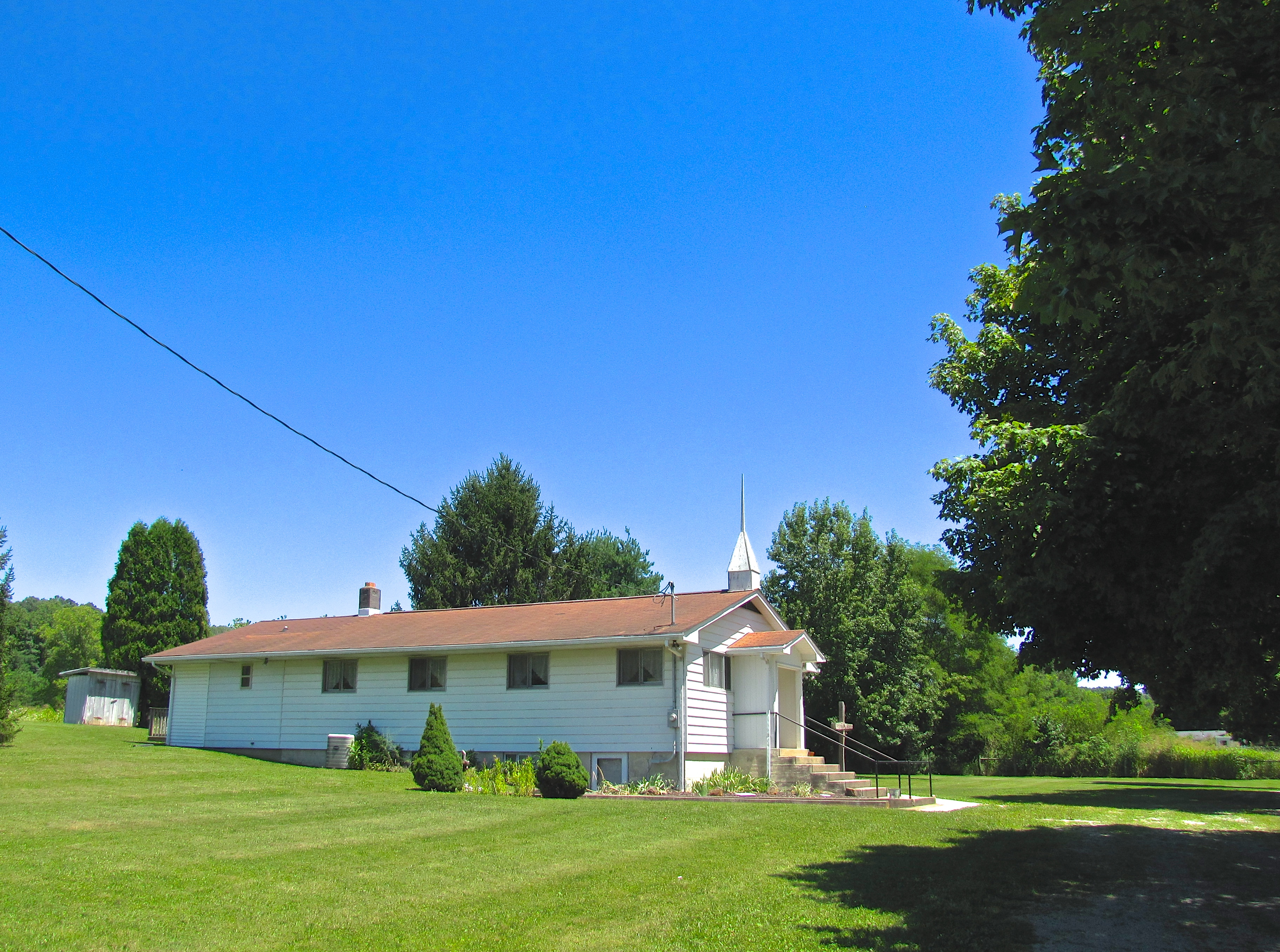
- Valley City Presbyterian Church

- Harrison County's location in Indiana

- Valley City's location in Harrison County
- Coordinates: 38°05′38″N 86°13′22″W
- Country: United States
- State: Indiana
- County: Harrison
- Township: Washington
- Elevation: 577 ft (176 m)
- ZIP code: 47142
- FIPS code: 18-78236
- GNIS feature ID: 445195

Valley City is an unincorporated community in Washington Township, Harrison County, Indiana.

== History ==
Valley City was platted in 1859. It was named for the valley in which it situated. A post office was established at Valley City in 1863, and remained in operation until it was discontinued in 1911.

== Geography ==
The community is situated near the head of Blue Spring Hollow, east of New Amsterdam and north of Mauckport.
