= Seal Islands (Aleutians East) =

Islands in Alaska, United States

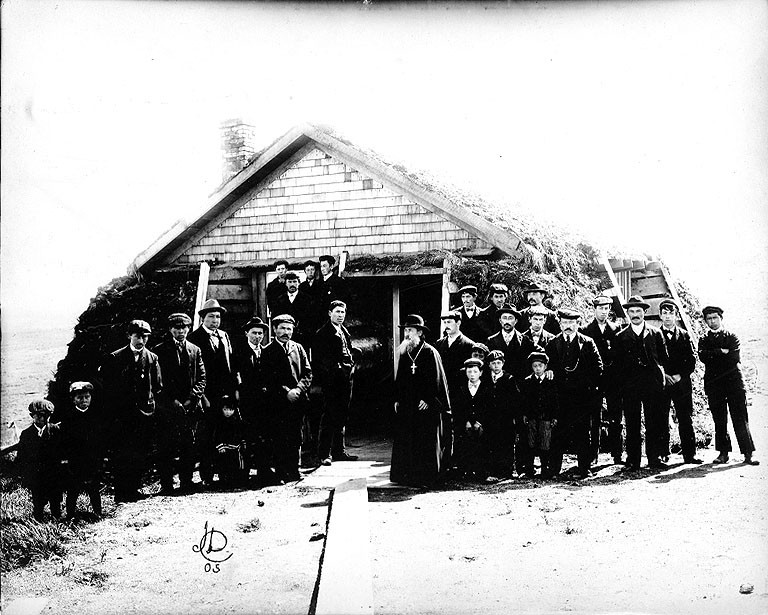
- Russian Orthodox priest and members of his congregation, ca. 1905

- Location within Alaska

Geography
- Location: Bering Sea
- Coordinates: 56°40′39″N 159°24′35″W
- Length: 7 mi (11 km)

Administration
- United States
- State: Alaska
- Borough: Aleutians East

Additional information
- Time zone: AKST (UTC-9)
  - Summer (DST): AKDT (UTC-8)
- ZIP code: 99...
- Area code: +1 907

The Seal Islands are a group of 12/+ islands in the Bering Sea, trending northeast 7 miles (11 km), close to the shores of Bristol Bay, Alaska, 33 miles (53 km) southwest of Port Heiden, Alaska Airfield; Bristol Bay Low.

== Etymology ==
The Seal Islands appear as "Ostrova Nerpichoi," meaning "Seal Islands" on Russian maps. They were given their name by Captain Mikhail Dmitrievich Tebenkov, who charted the Northwest Coasts of America (1852, map 24), IRN. They appeared for the first time as "Seal Islands" on an USBF chart in 1888.
