= USCGC Waesche =

Legend-class U.S. Coast Guard cutter

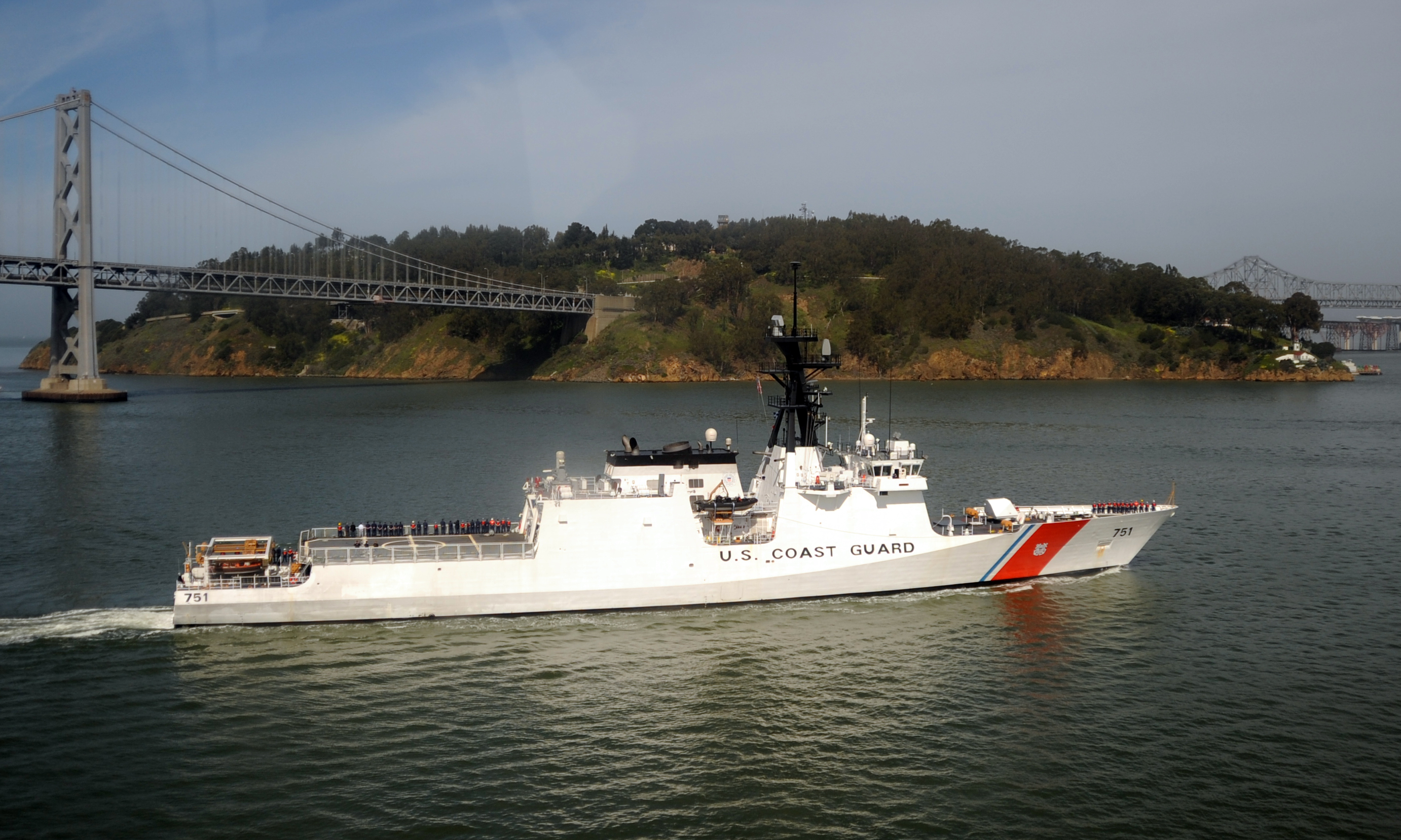
- Waesche arriving in San Francisco Bay, February 28, 2010

History

United States
- Namesake: Admiral Russell R. Waesche
- Ordered: January 2001
- Builder: Northrop Grumman Shipbuilding, Pascagoula, Mississippi
- Laid down: September 11, 2006
- Launched: July 12, 2008
- Sponsored by: Marilla Waesche Pivonka
- Commissioned: May 7, 2010
- Identification: MMSI number: 338850000; Callsign: NBGN
- Motto: "Strength Endurance Service"
- Status: In service
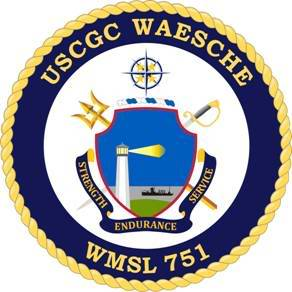
- Badge

General characteristics
- Displacement: 4,306 long tons (4,375 t)
- Length: 418 ft (127 m)
- Beam: 54 ft (16 m)
- Draft: 21 ft (6.4 m)
- Propulsion: Combined diesel and gas
- Speed: 28+ knots
- Range: 12,000 nm
- Endurance: 60 days
- Sensors & processing systems: EADS 3D TRS-16 AN/SPS-75 Air Search Radar; SPQ-9B Fire Control Radar; AN/SPS-73 Surface Search Radar; AN/SLQ-32
- Electronic warfare & decoys: AN/SLQ-32 Electronic Warfare System; 2 SRBOC/ 2 x NULKA countermeasures chaff/rapid decoy launcher
- Armament: 1 x MK 110 57mm gun a variant of the Bofors 57 mm gun and Gunfire Control System; 1 × 20 mm Block 1B Phalanx Close-In Weapons System; 4 × .50 caliber machine guns; 2 × M240B 7.62 mm machine guns
- Armor: Ballistic protection for main gun
- Aircraft carried: 2 x MH-65C Dolphin MCH, or 4 x VUAV or 1 x MH-65C Dolphin MCH and 2 x VUAV
- Aviation facilities: 50-by-80-foot (15 m × 24 m) flight deck, hangar for all aircraft

USCGC Waesche (WMSL-751) is the second Legend-class cutter of the United States Coast Guard.

== Namesake ==
Waesche is named for Coast Guard Admiral Russell R. Waesche (1886–1946). Waesche graduated from the United States Revenue Cutter Service School of Instruction in 1906, was commissioned an ensign, and then served with distinction in a succession of diverse and increasingly responsible Coast Guard assignments at sea and ashore. He served as Commandant of the Coast Guard from 1936 to 1945 during a tumultuous and eventful period in the life of the service, and was the first Coast Guardsman to achieve the rank of admiral.

== History ==
Construction began in 2006 by Northrop Grumman's Ship System Ingalls Shipyard in Pascagoula, Mississippi.

On November 6, 2009 the Coast Guard took delivery of the Waesche. She arrived at her homeport at Coast Guard Island, Alameda, California on February 28, 2010 and was commissioned on May 7, 2010. In 2012 Waesche became the 2nd U.S. surface combatant and the first Coast Guard cutter to use the Phalanx CIWS to defeat an unmanned aerial vehicle with a low, slow flying aircraft profile.

On 19 September 2020, the cutter was in the western Pacific where she suffered a stack fire. The blaze was controlled in ninety minutes. Five crewmen reported minor injuries and the vessel went to Yokosuka for inspection and repair at U.S. Naval Ship Repair Facility and Japan Regional Maintenance Center (SRF-JRMC). Repairs were completed in January 2021.

In the period between November 7, 2023 and November 20, 2023 the crew of USCGC Waesche offloaded approximately 18,219 lb (8,264 kg) of cocaine, with an estimated street value of more than US$239 million.

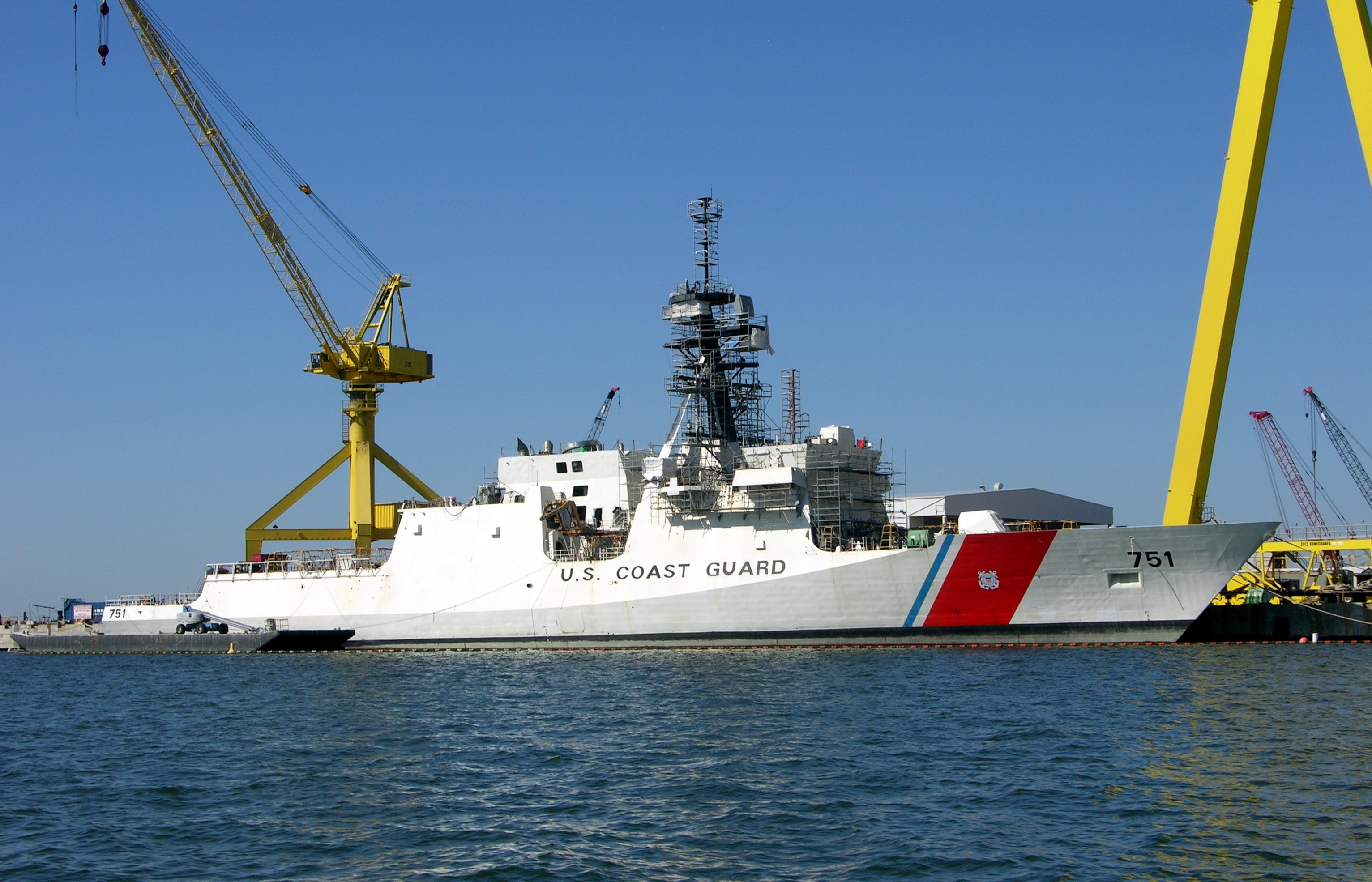
Waesche under construction at Northrop Grumman Ship Systems Ingalls Operations in Pascagoula, Mississippi

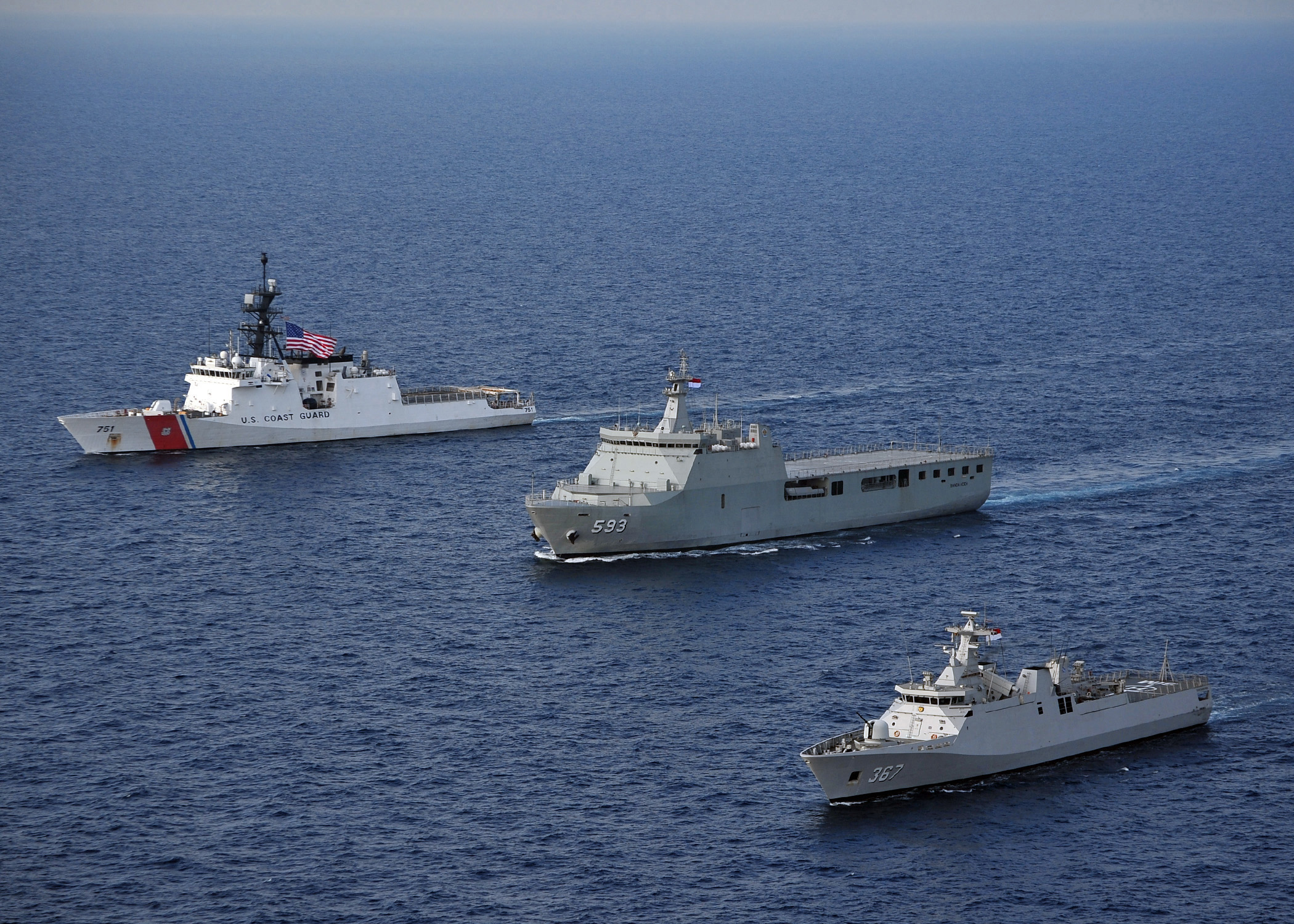
KRI Iskandar Muda, KRI Banda Aceh, and USCGC Waesche in Java Sea on 6 Jun 2012.

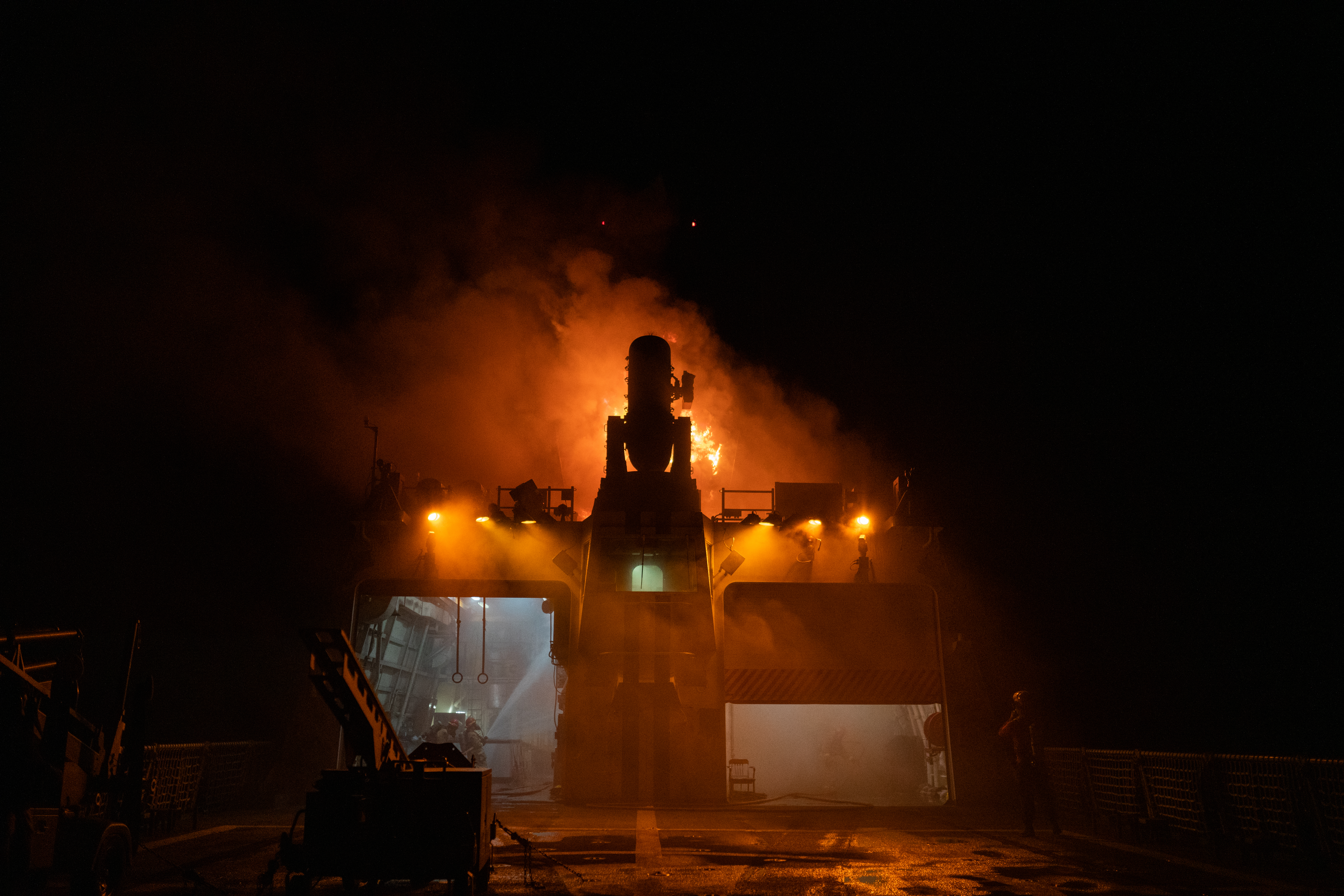
Members of Waesche's crew fighting the September 2020 fire

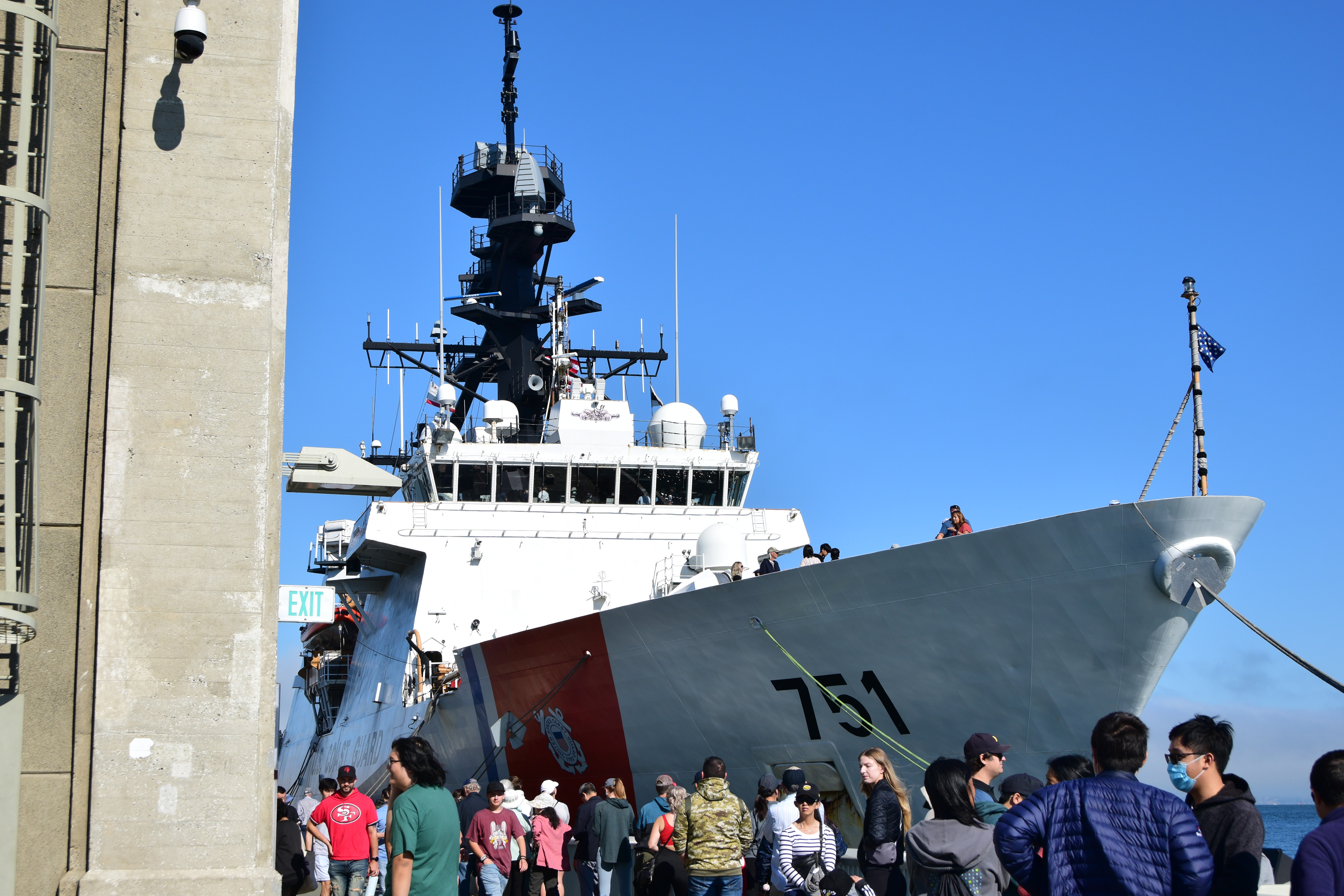
USCGC Waesche moored in San Francisco during Fleet Week 2023

== See also ==
- Integrated Deepwater System Program
- Legend-class United States Coast Guard Cutter
