= USRC Manhattan =

Tugboat of the U.S. Revenue Cutter Service

History

United States
- Name: USRC Manhattan, USCGC Manhattan (after 1915)
- Namesake: Borough of Manhattan, New York City, New York
- Builder: Charles Weidener; Chester, Pennsylvania
- Completed: 1873
- Decommissioned: 19 December 1917
- Renamed: Arundel after decommissioning
- Reclassified: station vessel at Baltimore, Maryland

General characteristics
- Type: Harbor tug
- Displacement: 147 tons
- Length: 102 ft (31 m)
- Beam: 20 ft 5 in (6.22 m)
- Draft: 8 ft 6 in (2.59 m)
- Depth: 11 ft (3.4 m)
- Propulsion: Compound-expansion steam, 19.5" and 30" diameter x 26" stroke
- Complement: 2 officers, 14 enlisted
- Armament: 1 gun, unknown caliber

USRC Manhattan was an iron-hulled harbor tug that served as a Revenue Cutter and was originally assigned to New York City harbor and Long Island Sound, but in 1875 she was moved to the Great Lakes with stations at Ogdensburg and Oswego, New York. After 1885 she was advertised for sale but was withdrawn and reassigned to the Hudson River and Long Island Sound. After decommissioning in 1917, she was moved to Baltimore, Maryland and renamed Arundel because a new Manhattan was being built. Although no longer in commission, she served as a station vessel until sold in 1927.
