= Frederick Albert Cleveland =

American economist

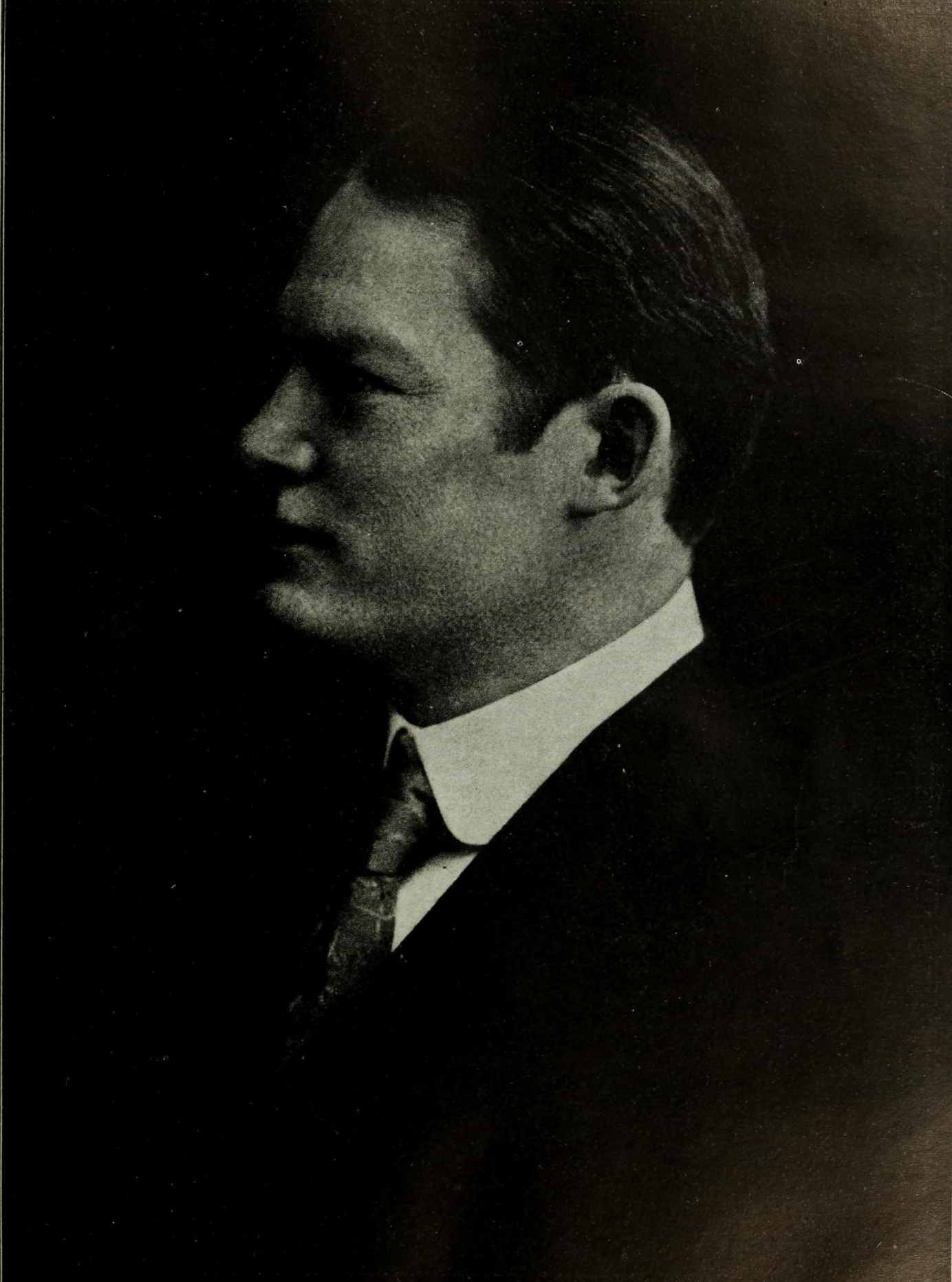

Frederick Albert Cleveland (17 March 1865, Sterling, Illinois – 1946) was a United States economist.

== Biography ==
He graduated from DePauw University in 1890. He studied for the bar, but gave up practice in 1896 and thereafter gave his entire attention to economics, pursuing special studies in economics first at the University of Chicago and then at the University of Pennsylvania (UPenn).

He was instructor in finance at UPenn from 1900 to 1903, and from 1903 to 1905 was professor of finance at the School of Commerce, New York University. He served as accounting expert on several commissions, including that on the finances of New York City (1905) and President Taft's commission on economy and efficiency (1911) which recommended a national budget. He was appointed director of the Bureau of Municipal Research in 1907.

In 1919 he joined the faculty of Boston University as professor of U.S. citizenship. He retired in 1939.

== Works ==
- Growth of Democracy in the United States (1898)
- Funds and their Uses (1902; revised 1922; school edition as First Lessons in Finance, 1903)
- The Bank and the Treasury (1905)
- Chapters on Municipal Administration and Accounting (1909)
- Organized Democracy (1913)
- Railroad Capitalization and Promotion, with Fred Wilbur Powell (1908)
- Railroad Finance, with Fred Wilbur Powell (1912)
- American Citizenship (1927)
- Modern Scientific Knowledge (1929)

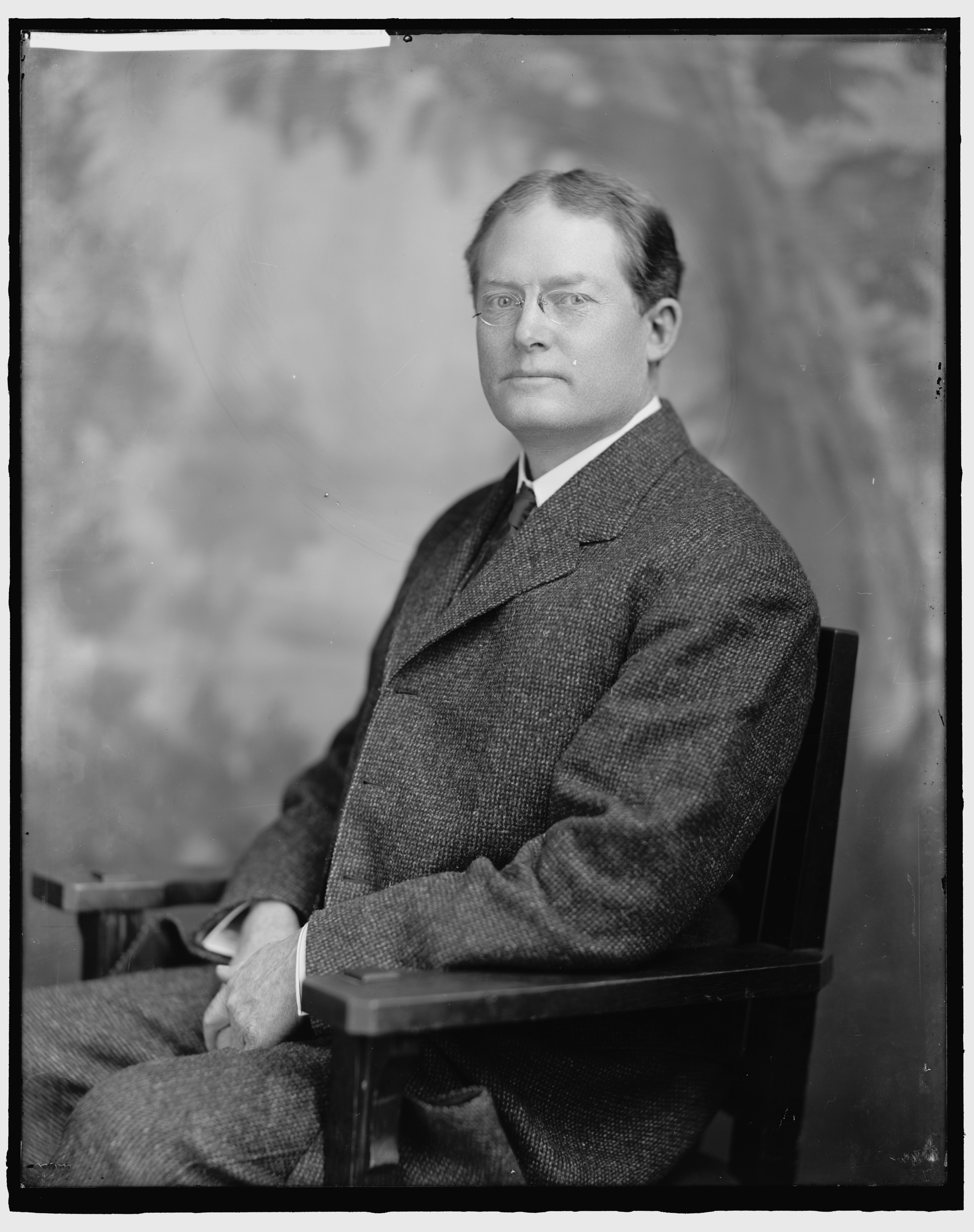
