= USRC Hamilton (1871) =

U.S. Revenue Cutter Service cutter

History

United States
- Namesake: Alexander Hamilton
- Builder: David Bell Co., Buffalo, New York
- Cost: $65,000
- Laid down: 1871
- Commissioned: 18 October 1871
- Decommissioned: 31 January 1906
- Fate: Sold 6 March 1906 for $2100

General characteristics
- Class & type: Gallatin Class
- Type: topsail schooner
- Displacement: 250 tons
- Length: 137 ft (42 m)
- Beam: 23 ft 6 in (7.16 m)
- Draft: 8 ft (2.4 m)
- Depth: 9 ft 4 in (2.84 m)
- Propulsion: 37" diameter x 32" stroke (1875), compound steam 23.5"; and 37" diameter x 32" stroke (1895)
- Complement: 7 officers, 33 enlisted
- Armament: 1 gun, unknown caliber

USRC Hamilton was a Revenue Cutter topsail schooner of the Gallatin class. She was named for Alexander Hamilton, first Secretary of the Treasury. An iron-hulled cutter with steam propulsion, she was constructed at Buffalo, New York by David Bell Co. in 1871 at a cost of US$65,000. The Gallatin class consisted of two ships, USRC Gallatin and Hamilton, however they differed in the propulsion machinery used. Hamilton was the first revenue cutter to use a compound steam engine for propulsion.

Between 1871 and 1898, the cutter operated along the eastern seaboard of the United States between Virginia and Massachusetts. During that service, she operated from various bases including Boston, Massachusetts, Philadelphia, Pennsylvania and Norfolk, Virginia. During the Spanish–American War Hamilton assisted with the blockading of Havana harbor. After the war she was assigned duties out of Savannah, Georgia until 1903, when she was assigned duties along the Gulf Coast. That area remained her zone of operations for the remainder of her career and on 31 January 1906, Hamilton was placed out of commission at Mobile, Alabama. She was sold to Lee Kimball, of Mobile, on 6 March 1906 for $2,100 and was delivered to him on 26 March.

== References used ==
- "Hamilton, 1871". U.S. Coast Guard Cutter History. U.S. Coast Guard Historian's Office.
- "Record of Movements, Vessels of the United States Coast Guard, 1790–December 31, 1933" (PDF). Historic Documents. U.S. Coast Guard Historian's Office.
- Canney, Donald L. (1995). U.S. Coast Guard and Revenue Cutters, 1790–1935. Naval Institute Press, Annapolis, Maryland. ISBN 978-1-55750-101-1.
- Evans, Stephen H. (1949). The United States Coast Guard 1790–1915: A Definitive History. Naval Institute Press, Annapolis, Maryland. No ISBN
