= W. T. Lopp =

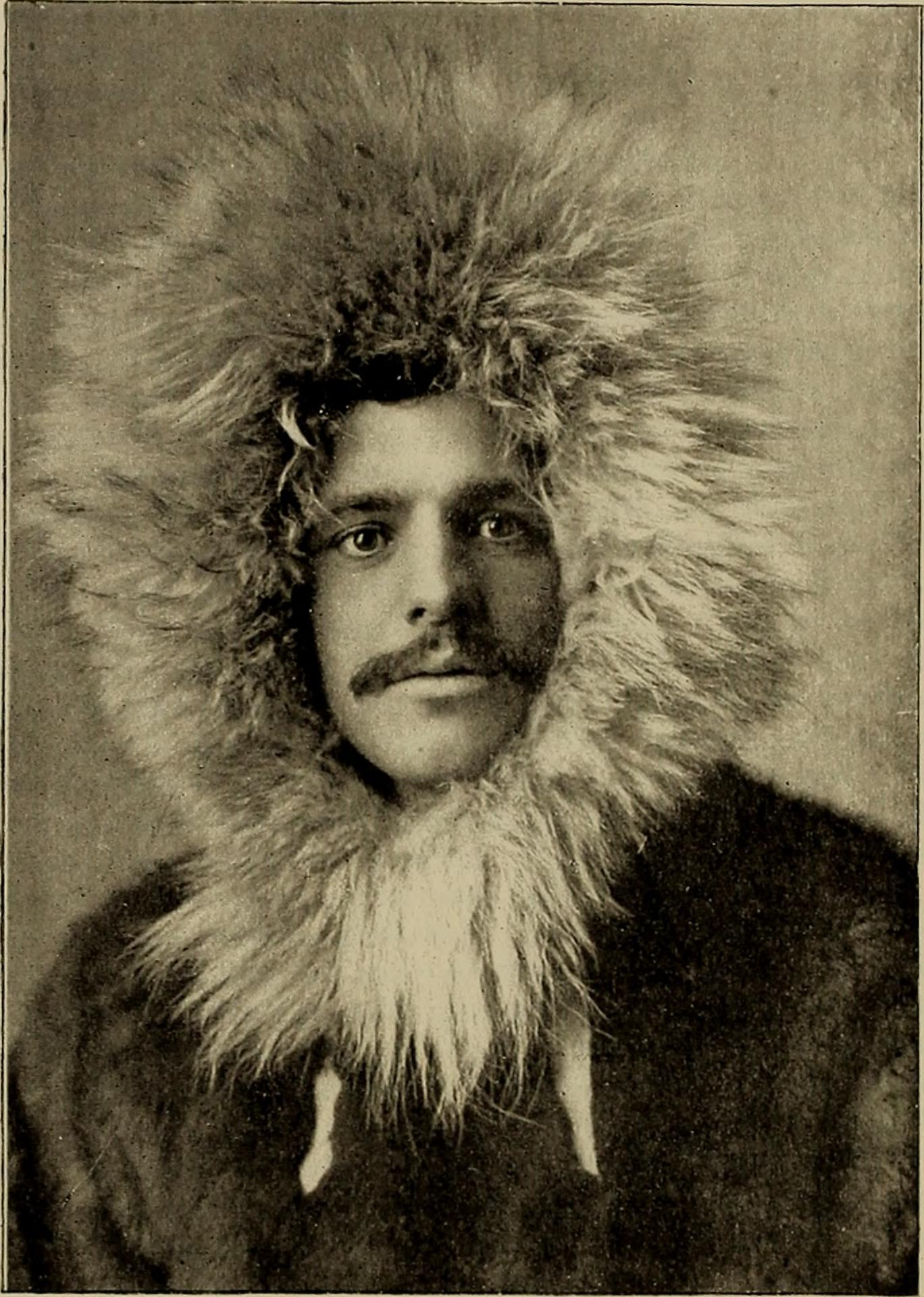
- Lopp in 1899
- Born: William Thomas Lopp; June 21, 1864; Valley City, Indiana
- Died: April 10, 1939 (aged 74)
- Education: Hanover College
- Occupation: Missionary
- Known for: Overland Relief Expedition, Lopp Lagoon

William Thomas Lopp (June 21, 1864 – April 10, 1939), known better professionally as W. T. Lopp, and to his family as Tom Lopp, was a member of the Overland Relief Expedition in Alaska, then a U.S. territory. He was a missionary and advocate of turning native hunters into self-sufficient reindeer herders. Lopp Lagoon, an 18 mi (29 km) long bay near where Lopp lived in Alaska, is named after him.

William Thomas Lopp was born June 21, 1864, to Jacob C. and Lucinda Trotter Lopp at Valley City, Indiana.

He earned a B.A. at Indiana's Hanover College in 1888.

== Alaska ==
In 1890, Lopp moved to Cape Prince of Wales, Alaska to teach at a mission school. After marrying Ellen Louise Kittredge in 1892, he and his wife continued to teach and learn Eskimo languages and Eskimo lifestyles. Seeing that Eskimo food sources were endangered by the encroachments of the burgeoning American and Canadian fishing industry, Lopp promoted reindeer herding among the native Alaskans as an alternative means of subsistence. In 1892 reindeer were brought over from Siberia and a "reindeer station" was established, with Lopp as superintendent.

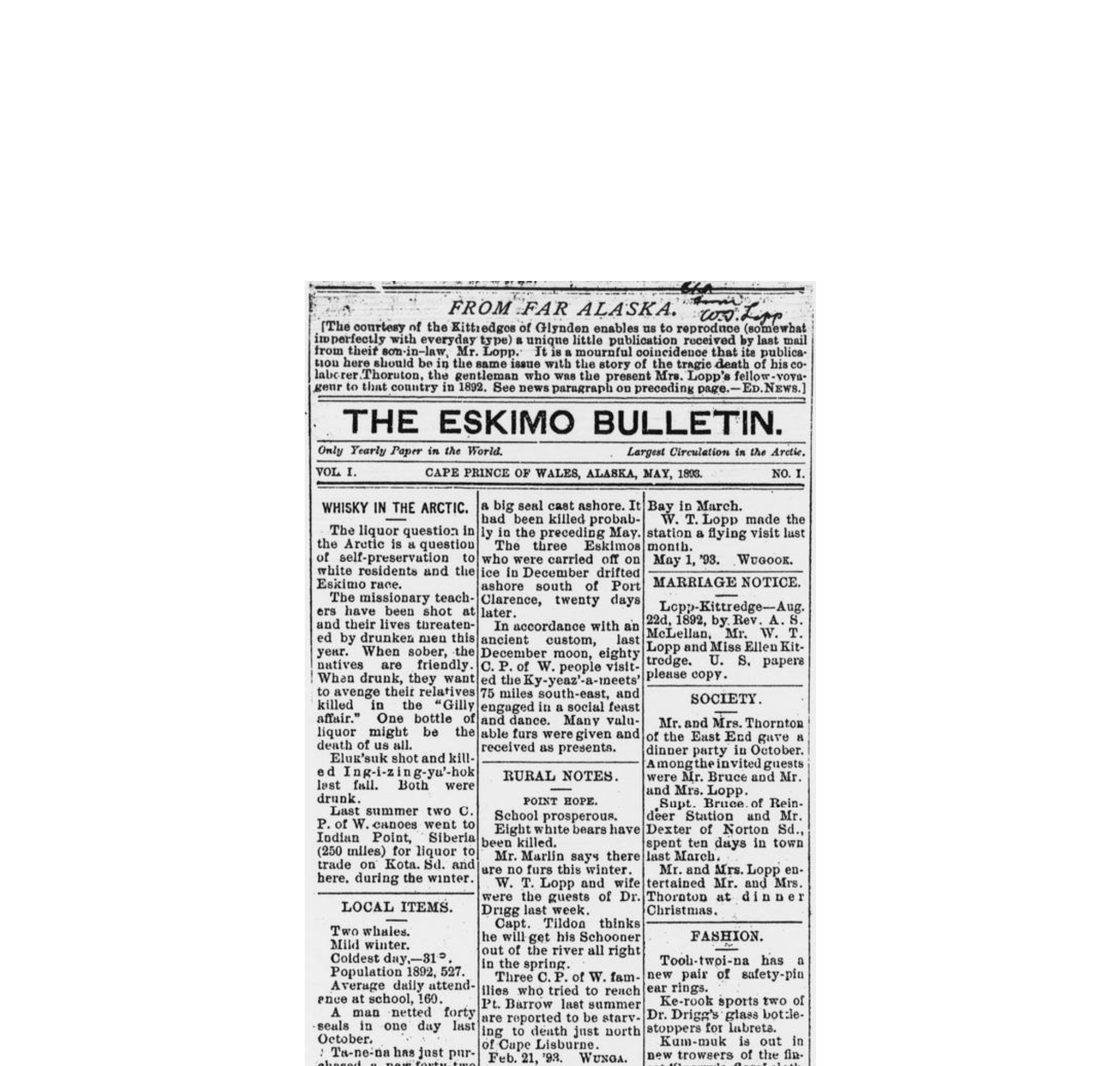
A printed version of The Eskimo Bulletin's first front page, the original having been written by hand

During this time, he also established a local newspaper, The Eskimo Bulletin. He did so with the help of fellow missionary Harrison R. Thornton, who was killed by a group of young Eskimo men shortly before the publication of the first issue in 1893. The newspaper, claimed to be "the only yearly newspaper in the world", was illustrated and printed by Eskimo employees as part of the broader mission of educating the local population in the English language. It focused almost entirely on local news, and ran sporadically until its final issue in 1902.

== Seattle, Washington ==
Lopp moved his family to Seattle, Washington, USA in 1902, but continued involvement in Alaskan native education and reindeer herding for 34 more years, holding a variety of government and private industry positions.

During his career Lopp established sixty-six schools, five hospitals and sanitation systems, and increased prosperity in the coastal villages of northern Alaska. Lopp died on April 10, 1939, survived by his wife Ellen and their seven surviving children.

== Appointments ==
- 1904–1909 Superintendent of government schools (Native) and reindeer, northern district, of Alaska.
- 1910–1923 Chief of the Alaska division of the U.S. Bureau of Education.
- 1923–1925 Superintendent of education of Natives of Alaska.
- 1925–? Reindeer expert for Hudson's Bay Company.

== Books about Lopp ==
- In a Far Country: The True Story of a Mission, a Marriage, a Murder, and the Remarkable Reindeer Rescue of 1898. by John Taliaferro. PublicAffairs (November 30, 2006)
- Ice Window: Letters from a Bering Strait Village 1898-1902. by Kathleen Lopp-Smith. University of Alaska Press (February 1, 2002)

== Books by Lopp ==
- White Sox: the story of the reindeer in Alaska. by William Thomas Lopp; H Boylston Dummer. Publisher: Yonkers-on-Hudson, N.Y. : World Book, 1924.
- Schools conducted by the United States government. by Douglas MacArthur; William Thomas Lopp; United States. Navy Dept.; United States. Indian School Service. Publisher: [S.l. : s.n.], 1913.
