= Overland Relief Expedition =

1890s American rescue mission

- Country: United States
- Leader: David H. Jarvis
- Start: Port Townsend, Washington; 1897
- End: Point Barrow, Alaska; 1898

The Overland Relief Expedition, also called the Alaska Relief Expedition or Point Barrow-Overland Relief Expedition, was an expedition in the winter of 1897–1898 by officers of the United States Revenue Cutter Service to save the lives of 265 whalers trapped in the Arctic Ocean by ice around their ships near Point Barrow, Alaska.

== Background ==
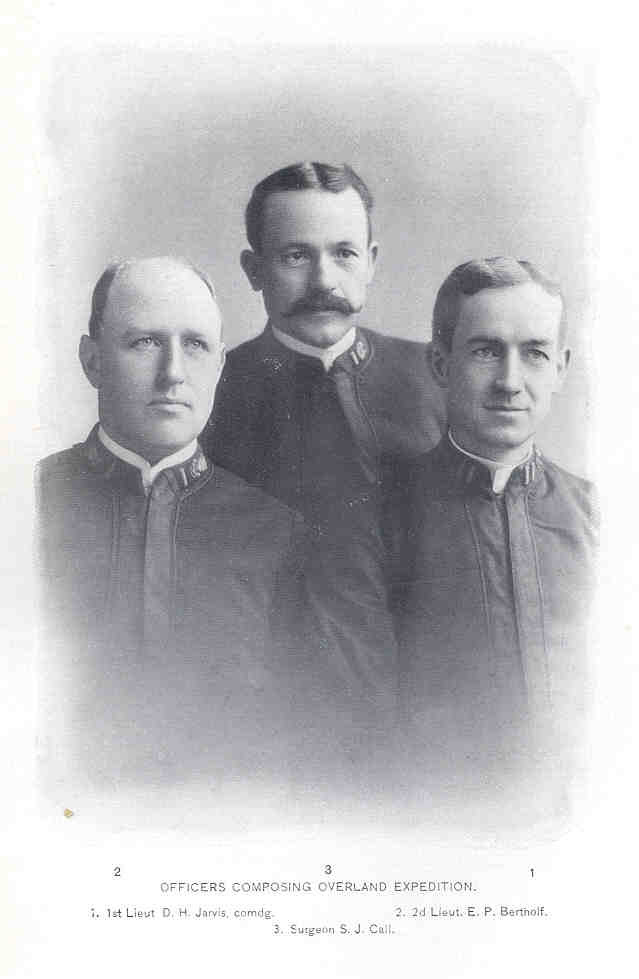
Members of the Overland Relief Expedition

In 1892, the government began a project of importing reindeer from Siberia to Alaska, and teaching the natives how to raise the animals in order to have a steady and dependable food supply. The reindeer were obtained by Captain Michael Healy, who was known and trusted by the Siberian natives. Sheldon Jackson, the General Superintendent of Alaska, used his influence in the United States Congress to raise funds to purchase and care for the animals, and was placed in overall charge of training the herders.

The project started with seventeen reindeer. From 1892 to 1906, cutters would cruise up the Siberian coast and barter with Chukchi for reindeer, which were then transported to a station at Port Clarence, near Nome, Alaska. In 1897, eight whaling ships were trapped in an Arctic ice field surrounding Point Barrow, the northernmost point of Alaska. The owners of the ships were concerned that the 265 men of the ships' crews would starve during the winter. They appealed to President William McKinley to send a relief expedition. McKinley asked the United States Treasury Department to organize an expedition, and they sent the USRC Bear, returned from Bering Sea Patrol, to undertake the expedition.

== Expedition ==
In November 1897, the Bear, commanded by Captain Francis Tuttle, sailed from Port Townsend, Washington. It was too late in the year for the cutter to push through the ice, so it was decided the party must go overland, enlisting the help of natives, stopping by a reindeer station to purchase a herd of reindeer.

The overland trek left from Cape Vancouver, Alaska on December 16, 1897. The expedition was led by First Lieutenant David H. Jarvis, the executive officer of the Bear; the second-in-command was Second Lieutenant Ellsworth P. Bertholf. They were accompanied by Samuel J. Call, the ship's surgeon of the Bear, and for part of the way by the enlisted man F. Koltchoff. They were also assisted by William Thomas Lopp, the Superintendent of the Teller Reindeer Station, and Charlie Antisarlook, a native reindeer herder. They traveled and carried the provisions using dog sleds, sleds pulled by reindeer, snowshoes, and skis.

After 1,500 miles (2,400 km), the group reached Point Barrow on March 29, 1898. The expedition brought 382 reindeer to the whalers, having lost only 66. The following summer, the Bear reached Point Barrow and the expedition officers could rejoin their ship.

== Recognition ==
President McKinley recognized the achievements of the rescue in a letter dated January 17, 1899 to the United States Congress, in which he asked Congress to award the three officers "gold medals of honor" "commemorative of their heroic struggles in aid of suffering fellow-men." He also recommended $2,500 to be disbursed by the United States Secretary of the Treasury to W.T. Lopp, Artisarlook, and the native herders who helped.

In recognition of their work, Jarvis, Bertholf, and Call received Congressional Gold Medals in 1902. The statute reads as follows:

Be it enacted by the Senate and House of Representatives of the United States of America in Congress assembled, That the Secretary of the Treasury is hereby directed to bestow a gold medal of honor, of such design as he may approve, upon First Lieutenant David H. Jarvis, Second Lieutenant Ellsworth P. Bertholf, and Doctor Samuel J. Call, surgeon, all of the Revenue-Cutter Service and members of the overland expedition of eighteen hundred and ninety-seven and eighteen hundred and ninety-eight for the relief of the whaling fleet in the arctic regions, in recognition of the heroic service rendered by them in connection with said expedition.

== See also ==
- Whaling disaster of 1871
