= USRC Miami =

Ship of the U.S. Revenue Cutter Service

History

United States
- Operator: United States Revenue Marine
- Cost: 25,000US$
- Launched: 1853 as Lady Le Marchant
- Acquired: 28 January 1862
- Commissioned: 28 January 1862
- Decommissioned: 19 April 1871
- Fate: Sold to Mason, Hobbs & Co.; Philadelphia for 2,149 US$
- Notes: Former British yacht, Lady Le Marchant

General characteristics
- Type: Schooner
- Displacement: 213 tons
- Length: 115 ft (35 m)
- Propulsion: 2-cylinder steam engine, 1 screw
- Complement: unknown
- Armament: 1 × 24-pounder; 1 × 12-pounder

The USRC Miami was purchased by the Revenue Cutter Service from Arthur Leary for $25,000 and was formerly the Lady Le Marchant, a 115-foot schooner-rigged steamer with a hull of teak planks over oak frames. After outfitting she was stationed briefly in Washington, D.C.

In April, 1862 she transported President Abraham Lincoln and others to Hampton Roads, Virginia, soon after the Battle of Hampton Roads between the ironclads CSS Virginia (ex-USS Merrimac) and the USS Monitor. After a transfer to New York City, she was tasked with escorting the captured Confederate steamer Chesapeake from Halifax, Nova Scotia, to New York City on 15 March 1864. The Miami underwent repairs at Newport, Rhode Island, after being transferred there in November, 1864. Additional repairs were done during 1867 at Staten Island and then she saw service out of Wilmington, Delaware, until being sold to Mason, Hobbs & Co., Philadelphia, Pennsylvania, for $2,149 on 19 April 1871.

== Notes ==
=== References used ===
- This article incorporates text from the public domain Dictionary of American Naval Fighting Ships.
- Canney, Donald L. (1995). U.S. Coast Guard and Revenue Cutters, 1790–1935. Naval Institute Press, Annapolis, Maryland. ISBN 978-1-55750-101-1.
- "Record of Movements, Vessels of the United States Coast Guard, 1790–December 31, 1933" (PDF). Historic Documents. U.S. Coast Guard Historian's Office. Archived (PDF) from the original on 21 October 2022.
