= History of the United States Coast Guard =

The history of the United States Coast Guard goes back to the United States Revenue Cutter Service, which was founded on 4 August 1790 as part of the Department of the Treasury. The Revenue Cutter Service and the United States Life-Saving Service were merged to become the Coast Guard per 14 U.S.C. § 101 which states: "The Coast Guard as established January 28, 1915, shall be a military service and a branch of the armed forces of the United States at all times." In 1939 the United States Lighthouse Service was merged into the Coast Guard. The Coast Guard itself was moved to the Department of Transportation in 1967, and on 1 March 2003 it became part of the Department of Homeland Security. However, under 14 U.S.C. § 3 as amended by section 211 of the Coast Guard and Maritime Transportation Act of 2006, upon the declaration of war and when Congress so directs in the declaration, or when the president directs, the Coast Guard operates as a service in the Department of the Navy.

== Early history ==
=== The Revenue-Marine ===
The modern Coast Guard was created in 1915 by the merger of the United States Revenue Cutter Service and the United States Lifesaving Service, but its roots go back to the early days of the Republic. Secretary of the Treasury Alexander Hamilton lobbied Congress to authorize a "system of cutters" to enforce tariffs, which were a major source of revenue for the new nation. On 4 August 1790 (now recognized as the Coast Guard's official birthday), Congress passed the Tariff Act, permitting the construction of ten cutters and the recruitment of 40 revenue officers. Each cutter was assigned one master and three mates who were commissioned officers. In addition, each cutter was allowed four mariners and two boys. The cutters were collectively referred to as the "Revenue-Marine," but were not part of an organized service or agency. Each revenue cutter operated independently, with each assigned to patrol a section of the east coast and reporting directly to the Customs House in a major port. From 1790, when the Continental Navy was disbanded, to 1798, when the United States Navy was created, these "revenue cutters" were the country's only naval force. As such, the cutters and their crews took on a wide variety of duties beyond the enforcement of tariffs, including combating piracy, rescuing mariners in distress, ferrying government officials, and even carrying mail. In 1794, the Revenue-Marine was given the mission of preventing trading in slaves from Africa to the United States. Between 1794 and 1865, the Revenue-Marine captured approximately 500 slave ships. In 1808, the Revenue-Marine was responsible for enforcing President Thomas Jefferson's embargo closing U.S. ports to European trade. The 1822 Timber Act tasked the Revenue Cutter Service with protecting government timber from poachers (this is viewed as the beginning of the Coast Guard's environmental protection mission). During times of war or crisis, the revenue cutters and their crews were put at the disposal of the Navy. The Revenue-Marine was involved in the Quasi-War with France from 1798 to 1799, the War of 1812, West Indies Anti-Piracy Operation, the Second Seminole War, and the Mexican–American War.

=== United States Revenue Cutter Service ===
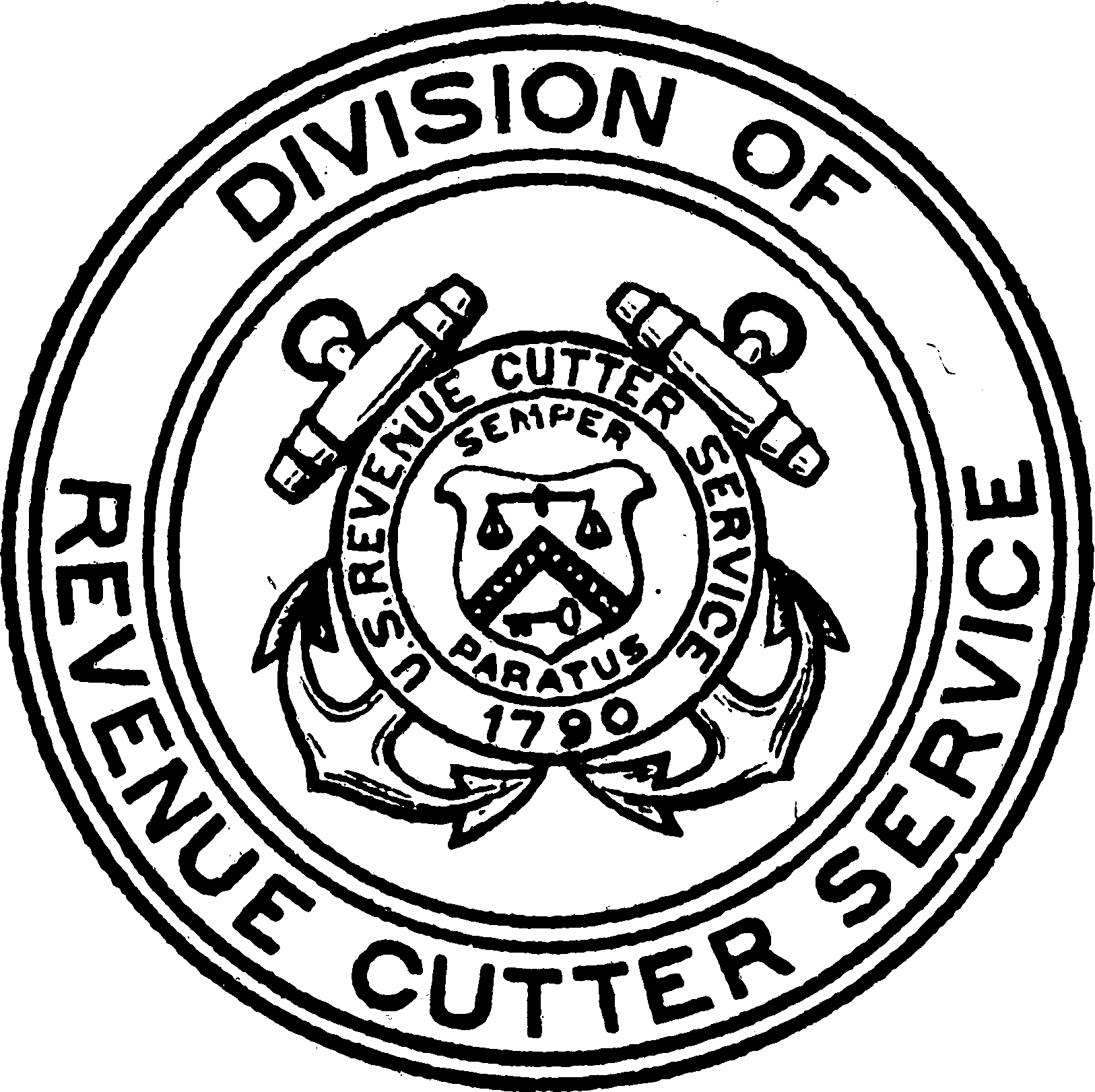
Seal of the United States Revenue Cutter Service

The service was first officially referred to as the Revenue Cutter Service in a law passed by Congress in 1863 but the service was also known interchangeably with the Revenue-Marine until about 1890. During the American Civil War, USRC Harriet Lane fired the first naval shots of the war, engaging the steamer Nashville during the siege of Fort Sumter. President Lincoln invoked "Act of March 2, 1799" which allowed him to order the revenue cutters to combat duty with the Navy. Lincoln directed the Secretary of the Treasury on 14 June 1863, to assign the revenue cutters to the North Atlantic Blockading Squadron Revenue cutter officers who left the Revenue Cutter Service and joined the Confederacy retained their commissions and on 24 December 1861 the Confederate Congress authorized the president to employ the officers in any naval or military capacity. Some joined the army and navy, but some continued as revenue cutter officers serving the Confederacy.

After the purchase of Alaska in 1867, USRC Lincoln, with First Lieutenant George W. Moore aboard was dispatched to Sitka to establish United States sovereignty as agent of the U.S. Collector of Customs in San Francisco. Lincoln was directed to make a reconnaissance of the coastline. In the 1880s through the 1890s, the Revenue Cutter Service was instrumental in the development of Alaska. Captain "Hell Roaring" Michael A. Healy, captain of the USRC Bear, greatly assisted a program that brought reindeer to Alaska to provide a steady food source for native Eskimos. During the winter of 1897–1898, First Lieutenant David H. Jarvis, Second Lieutenant Ellsworth P. Bertholf of the Revenue Cutter Service and Surgeon Samuel J. Call, Public Health Service drove a reindeer herd across 1,500 miles in the Overland Relief Expedition to help starving whalers trapped by ice near Point Barrow. Congress awarded the three men Congressional Gold Medals for "heroic service rendered" on 28 June 1902. During the Spanish–American War USRC Hudson assisted the U.S. Navy during the Second Battle of Cárdenas by towing the disabled USS Winslow out of range from Spanish artillery. Three sailors aboard Winslow received the Navy Medal of Honor for their actions during the battle but because at the time members of the Revenue Cutter Service were not eligible for the Medal of Honor, Congress approved a special medal struck for them. First Lieutenant Frank Newcomb, the commanding officer of Hudson, received the medal in gold, his officers received it in silver, and the enlisted crewmen in bronze.

=== United States Lifesaving Service ===
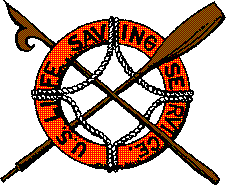
Seal of the United States Life-Saving Service

A number of voluntary organizations had formed in coastal communities in the 1700s and early 1800s to assist shipwrecked mariners by means of small boats at shore-based stations, notably the Massachusetts Humane Society, which was established in 1786. These stations were normally unoccupied – essentially storehouses for boats and equipment to be used by volunteers. With the signing of the Newell Act on 14 August 1848, Congress appropriated $10,000 to fund lifesaving stations along the east coast. These were loosely administered by the Revenue-Marine, but still dependent on volunteers.

This system continued until 1 February 1871 when Sumner Kimball was appointed Chief of the Revenue Marine Division of the Treasury Department by Secretary of the Treasury George S. Boutwell. (Note: Kimball preferred to use the term "Revenue Marine Bureau" and various references use either Division or Bureau to identify the entity.) Congress finally formalized the organization of the division on 3 March 1875. Kimball convinced Congress to appropriate $200,000 to construct new stations, repair old ones, and provide full-time crews. Shortly thereafter, in 1878, the U.S. Lifesaving Service was officially organized and Kimball volunteered to lead the service. Kimball held the position of superintendent until the merger of the service with the Revenue Cutter Service in 1915.

Although the Revenue Cutter Service is perhaps more recognized as the predecessor of the Coast Guard, the Lifesaving Service's legacy is apparent in many ways, not the least of which is the prominence of the Coast Guard's search and rescue mission in the eyes of the public. The Coast Guard takes its unofficial search and rescue motto, "You have to go out, but you don't have to come back," from the 1899 regulations of the United States Life Saving Service, which stated:

In attempting a rescue the keeper will select either the boat, breeches buoy, or life car, as in his judgment is best suited to effectively cope with the existing conditions. If the device first selected fails after such trial as satisfies him that no further attempt with it is feasible, he will resort to one of the others, and if that fails, then to the remaining one, and he will not desist from his efforts until by actual trial the impossibility of effecting a rescue is demonstrated. The statement of the keeper that he did not try to use the boat because the sea or surf was too heavy will not be accepted unless attempts to launch it were actually made and failed [underlining added], or unless the conformation of the coast—as bluffs, precipitous banks, etc.—is such as to unquestionably preclude the use of a boat.

A number of Coast Guard traditions survive from, or pay homage to, the Lifesaving Service as well. For example, members of the Lifesaving Service were referred to as "surfmen," and today the Surfman Badge it awarded to coxswains who qualify to operate motor lifeboats in heavy surf conditions. The badge's design is similar to the Lifesaving Service's seal.

=== Coast Guard Academy ===
The School of Instruction of the Revenue Cutter Service was established on 31 July 1876 near New Bedford, Massachusetts. It used USRC James C. Dobbin for its training exercises. Dobbin was replaced in 1878 with USRC Salmon P. Chase, which was specially designed for the assignment as a training cutter. The School of Instruction moved to Curtis Bay, Maryland in 1900 and then again in 1910 to Fort Trumbull, near New London, Connecticut. The school provided a two-year premise to ship supplemented by some class work and tutoring in technical subjects. In 1903, the third year of instruction was added. The school was oriented to line officers, as engineers were hired directly from civilian life. In 1906 an engineering program for cadets began. Nevertheless, the school remained small, with 5 to 10 cadets per class. In 1914 the School became the Revenue Cutter Academy and with the merger of the Revenue Cutter Service and the Life Saving Service in 1915, it became the United States Coast Guard Academy. In February 1929, Congress appropriated $1,750,000 for construction of buildings to be used for the academy. The city of New London purchased the land on the Thames River and donated it to the government for use as a Coast Guard facility. Construction began in 1931 and the first cadets began occupying the new facilities in 1932. A fourth year of classes was added in 1932.

=== Creation of the modern Coast Guard ===
On 28 January 1915, the United States Revenue Cutter Service and the United States Lifesaving Service were merged by act of Congress to form the United States Coast Guard. On the day of its creation, the Coast Guard had approximately 255 officers, 3900 warrant officers and enlisted men manning a headquarters, 17 regional commands, 4 depots, an academy, 25 cruising cutters, 20 harbor cutters and 280 lifeboat stations.

== World War I ==
=== Preparation ===
The Coast Guard's preparations for the coming war actually started before the Declaration of War on 6 April 1917. In late 1916, the Interdepartmental Board on Coast Communications recommended that telephone communications be improved and brought to a high state of readiness all along the U.S. coastline to include lighthouses and lifesaving stations as well as other government coastal facilities. Sensing a need for aviation, the Coast Guard sent Third Lieutenant Elmer Stone to Naval Flight Training on 21 March 1916. On 22 March 1917 the Commandant issued a twelve-page manual titled Confidential Order No. 2, Mobilization of the U.S. Coast Guard When Required to Operate as a Part of the U.S. Navy. Germany had already announced a policy of unrestricted submarine warfare on 30 January 1917, on all ships trading with its enemies and included neutral shipping as targets. U.S. merchant ships sunk before a declaration of war included Housatonic, Vigilancia, Healdton, Aztec and others, with the loss of 36 U.S. lives.

=== Declaration of war ===
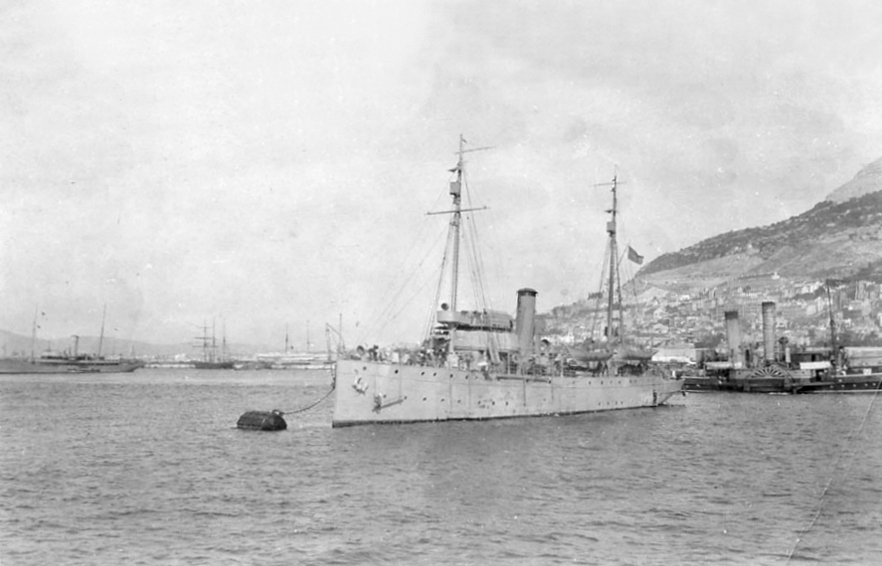
USCGC Tampa in port

On 6 April 1917, with a formal declaration of war, the Coast Guard was transferred to the operational control of the Navy. All cutters were to report to the nearest Naval District commander and stand by for further orders. All normal operations were suspended with the exception of rescues pending orders from the Navy. Secretary of the Navy Josephus Daniels directed that although the Coast Guard was then a part of the Navy, that most of the administrative details handled by Coast Guard Headquarters would not be changed. At the outset of the war the Coast Guard consisted of less than 4000 officers and men, had 23 cruising cutters, 21 harbor cutters, 272 rescue stations and 21 cadets at the Coast Guard Academy. The Coast Guard was still in a formative stage of development from the merger of the U.S. Revenue Cutter Service and the U.S. Lifesaving Service. Because of this fact, there was not much interaction between the two former entities during the war. A qualified Lifesaving Service surfman who wished to transfer to a cutter had to be reduced to ordinary seaman upon reporting because of a lack of shipboard skills. Because of this transfers were infrequent. There were no chief petty officers in the Coast Guard at this time and Coast Guard petty officers assigned to Navy ships often served under less experienced supervisors for less pay. Coast Guard cutters were seen by the Navy as ready assets and were used to fill in for a rapidly expanding Navy. The Navy recognized Coast Guard officers and petty officers as the experienced mariners that they were and often put them on Navy ships to fill in for crew shortages and lack of experience. In January 1918, Myrtle Hazard enlisted in the Coast Guard, served as a telegraph operator, and was discharged as an Electrician 1st Class. She was the only woman to serve in the Coast Guard during the war and she is the namesake of USCGC Myrtle Hazard. Wartime newspapers erroneously reported that twin sisters Genevieve and Lucille Baker were the first women to serve in the Coast Guard. While they tried to enlist, they were not accepted.

=== Sinking of USCGC Tampa ===
During the late afternoon of 26 September 1918, USCGC Tampa parted company with convoy HG 107, which she had just escorted into the Irish Sea from Gibraltar. Ordered to put into Milford Haven, Wales, she proceeded independently toward her destination. At 1930 that evening, as she transited the Bristol Channel, the warship was spotted by UB-91. According to the submarine war diary entry, the U-boat dived and maneuvered into an attack position, firing one torpedo out of the stern tube at 2015 from a range of about 550 meters. Minutes later, the torpedo hit Tampa and exploded portside amidships, throwing up a huge, luminous column of water. The cutter sank with all hands: 111 Coast Guardsmen, 4 U.S. Navy sailors, and 16 passengers consisting of 11 Royal Navy sailors and 5 Maritime Service Merchant Marines. The sinking of Tampa was the largest single loss of Coast Guard personnel in the war. She sank in the Bristol Channel at roughly 50°40′N 6°19′W.

== The 1920s ==
=== Post-war struggle to remain a separate armed service ===
In 1920 the House Committee on Interstate and Foreign Commerce held hearings on merging the recently created Coast Guard into the United States Navy.

=== Prohibition ===
In the 1920s the Coast Guard was given several former U.S. Navy four-stack destroyers to help enforce Prohibition. The effort was not entirely successful, due to the slowness of the destroyers. However, the mission provided many Coast Guard officers and petty officers with operational experience which proved invaluable in World War II. The Navy's epithet of "Hooligan Navy" dates from this era, due to the Coast Guard's flexibility in enlisting men discharged from other services to rapidly expand; it has endured due to the high proportion of prior-other-service enlisteds, and become a term of pride within the service. Commandant Billard utilized intelligence operatives, cryptology, counterintelligence campaigns and the first signals intercept vessel to support headquarters operations.

=== 1927 Mississippi River flood ===
During the disastrous 1927 Mississippi River flood, the Coast Guard rescued a total of 43,853 people who they "removed from perilous positions to places of safety". Also, they saved 11,313 head of livestock and furnished transportation for 72 persons in need of hospitalization. In all 674 coast guardsmen and 128 Coast Guard vessels and boats served in the relief operations.

== The 1930s ==
=== Regulation of merchant shipping ===
The Steamboat Inspection Service was merged with the Bureau of Navigation, created in 1884, to oversee the regulation of merchant seamen, on 30 June 1932. In 1934, the passenger liner Morro Castle suffered a serious fire off the coast of New Jersey, which ultimately claimed the lives of 124 passenger and crew. The casualty prompted new fire protection standards for vessels and paved the way for the "Act of May 27, 1936", which reorganized and changed the name of the Bureau of Navigation and Steamboat Inspection Service to the Bureau of Marine Inspection and Navigation. Marine inspection and navigation duties under the Bureau of Marine Inspection and Navigation were temporarily transferred to the Coast Guard by executive order on 28 February 1942. This transfer of duties fit well with the Coast Guard's port safety and security missions, and was made permanent in 1946.

=== Carl von Paulsen rescue ===
Lieutenant Commander Carl von Paulsen set down the seaplane Arcturus in a heavy sea in January 1933 off Cape Canaveral and rescued a boy adrift in a skiff. The aircraft sustained so much damage during the open water landing that it could not take off. Ultimately, Arcturus washed onto the beach and all including the boy were saved. Commander Paulsen was awarded the Gold Lifesaving Medal for this rescue.

=== Formation of the Coast Guard Auxiliary ===
On June 23, 1939, the United States Congress passed the Coast Guard Reserve Act of 1939, creating a volunteer reserve force for the United States Coast Guard. Initially, the Coast Guard Reserve was a civilian volunteer force, and was the predecessor of the Coast Guard Auxiliary. The split between the Reserve and the Auxiliary would not occur until 1941.

=== Absorption of the United States Lighthouse Service ===
The United States Lighthouse Service which was the oldest government agency, dating from 7 August 1789, was absorbed by the Coast Guard on 1 July 1939.

== The 1940s ==
=== World War II ===
Before the American entry into World War II, cutters of the Coast Guard patrolled the North Atlantic. In January 1940 President Roosevelt directed the establishment of the Atlantic Weather Observation Service using Coast Guard cutters and U.S. Weather Bureau observers.

After the invasion of Denmark by Germany on 9 April 1940, President Roosevelt ordered the International Ice Patrol to continue as a legal pretext to patrol Greenland, whose cryolite mines were vital to refining aluminum and whose geographic location allowed accurate weather forecasts to be made for Europe. The Greenland Patrol was maintained by the Coast Guard for the duration of the war.

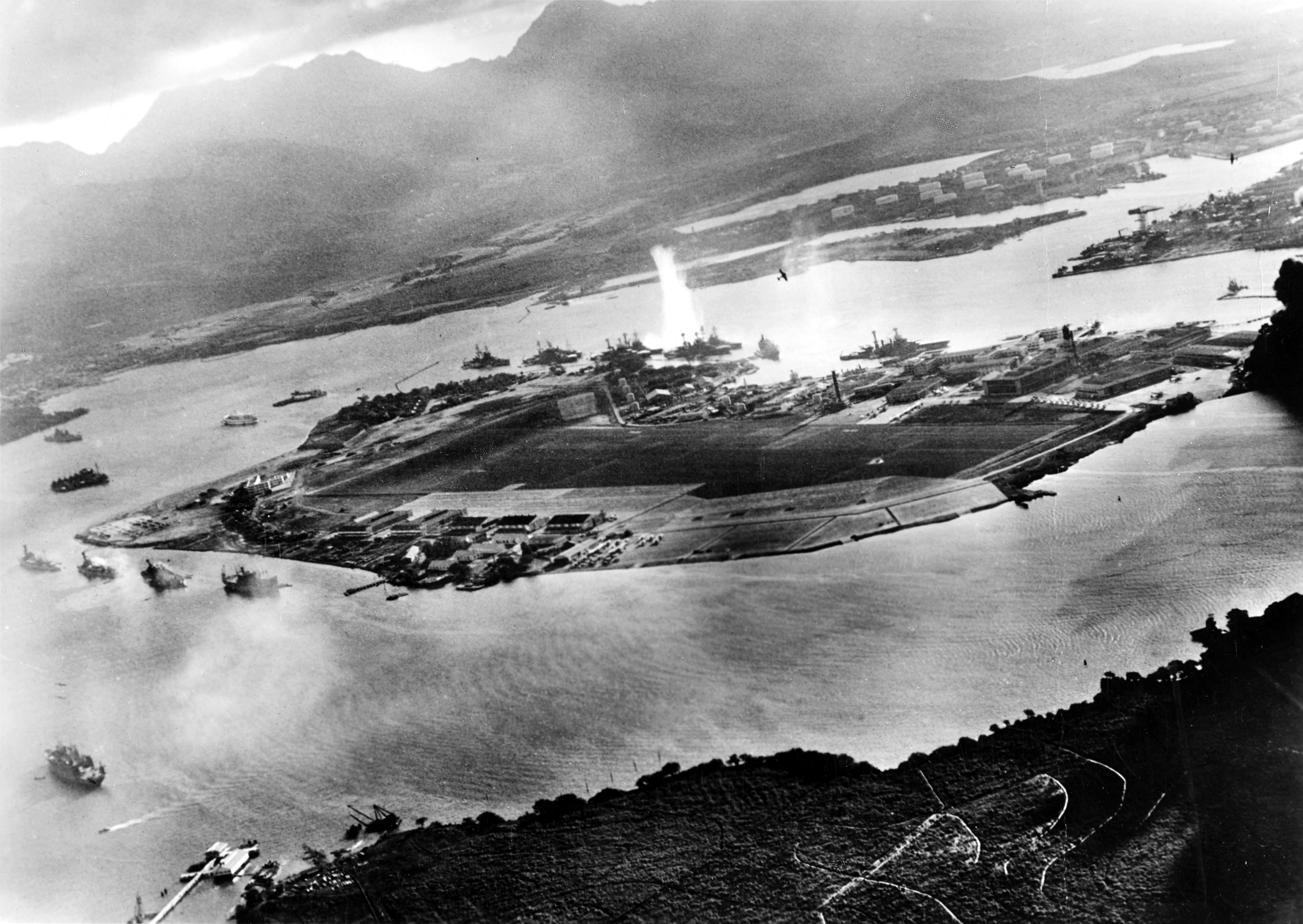
Attack on Pearl Harbor Japanese planes view

The Coast Guard became directly involved in the first World War II attack on America in the 1941 Attack on Pearl Harbor. Supporting U.S. naval forces on 7 December, were the Coast Guard cutters, patrol boats, bases, stations, lighthouses and personnel assigned to the 14th Naval District. These units included USCGC Taney and patrol cutters Tiger and Reliance; buoy tenders Kukui and Walnut; patrol boats CG-400, CG-403, CG-27, and CG-8; a buoy boat and the former Lighthouse Service launch Lehua all participated in the battle shooting at several aircraft.

USCGC Taney, a notable World War II era high endurance cutter, is the only warship still afloat today (as a museum ship in Baltimore) that was present for the attack on Pearl Harbor in 1941, although she was actually stationed in nearby Honolulu. Coast Guard aviator, Lieutenant Frank Erickson, who later pioneered search and rescue helicopter flight, although assigned to Taney was standing watch at Ford Island before the attack then took command of an anti-aircraft battery to fight off multiple enemy aircraft.

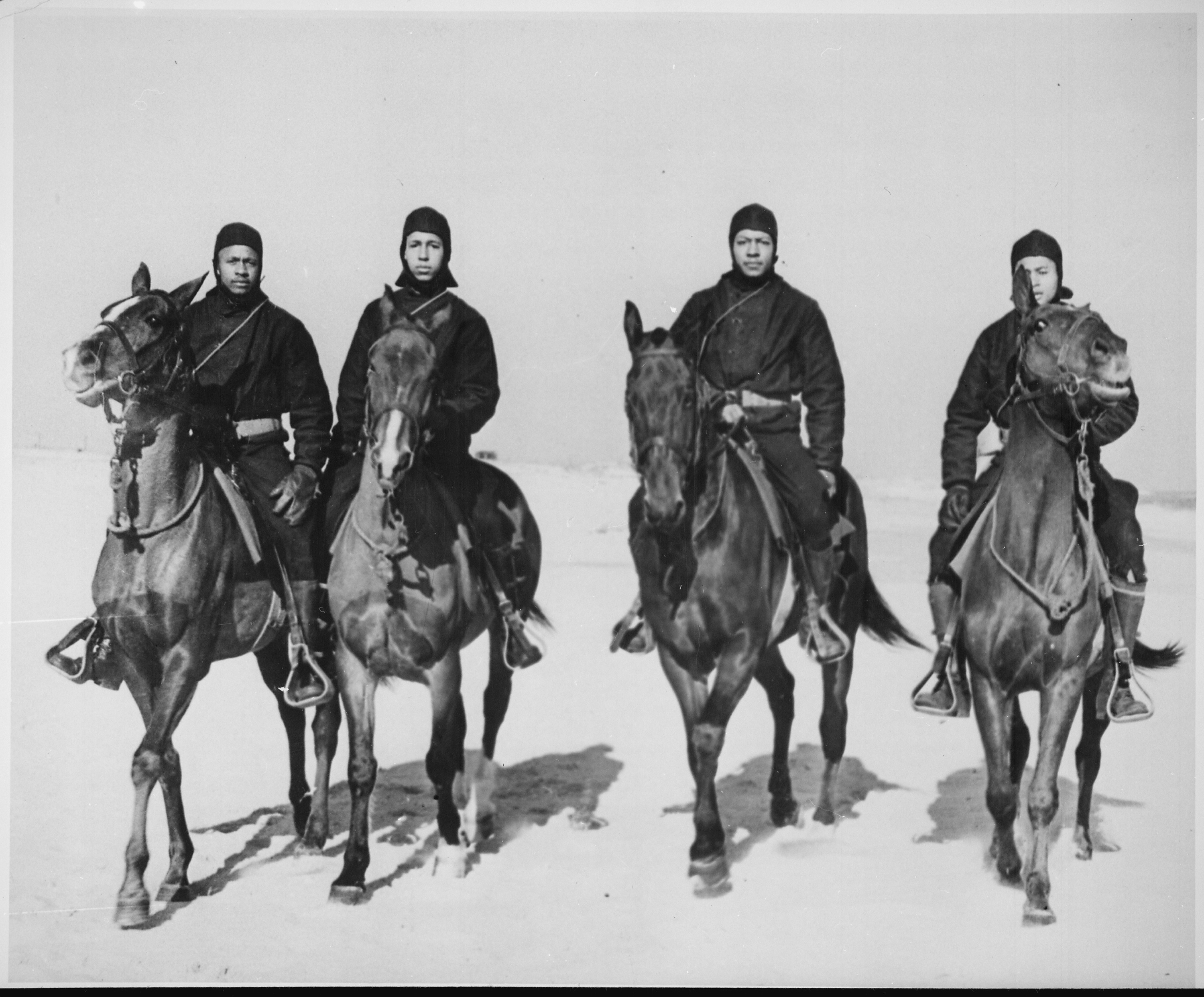
U.S. Coast Guard Horse Patrol, circa 1941-45

During World War II, there was great concern about enemy vessels nearing U.S. shores, allowing adversarial forces to invade the nation. Beach patrols manned by Coast Guardsmen gained increased importance as security forces with three basic functions: to look for and report on any suspicious vessels operating in the area; to report and prevent attempts of landings by the enemy; and to prevent communication between persons on shore and the enemy at sea. Patrolled the shores of the United States during the war. On 13 June 1942 Seaman 2nd Class John Cullen, patrolling the beach in Amagansett, New York, discovered the first landing of German saboteurs in Operation Pastorius. Cullen was the first American who actually came in contact with the enemy on the shores of the United States during the war and his report led to the capture of the German sabotage team. For this, Cullen received the Legion of Merit.

USCGC Modoc was peripherally involved in the chase and sinking of the German battleship Bismarck.

In response to growing tensions due to the Second World War, the Coast Guard Reserve was established by the passage of the Coast Guard reserve and Auxiliary Act of February 19, 1941, separating the Auxiliary from the Reserve.

Shortly after Germany declared war on the United States, German submarines began Operation Drumbeat ("Paukenschlag"), sinking ships off the American coast and in the Caribbean. On 15 March 1942, USCGC Acacia, while en route from Curaçao to Antigua, was sunk by U-161 about 150 miles south of Port au Prince, all hands were rescued with no loss of life.

Many Coast Guard cutters were involved in rescue operations following German attacks on American shipping. USCGC Icarus, a 165-foot (50 m) cutter that previously had been a rumrunner chaser during Prohibition, sank U-352 on 9 May 1942, off the coast of Cape Lookout, North Carolina, and took 33 prisoners, the first Germans taken in combat by any U.S. force.

USCGC Thetis sank U-157 on 10 June 1942. During the war, Coast Guard units sank 12 German and two Japanese submarines and captured two German surface vessels.

When USCGC Campbell rammed and sank U-606, her enlisted mascot Sinbad became a public hero at home and brought attention to the role of the Coast Guard in convoy protection.

The Coast Guard had 30 Edsall class destroyer escorts under its command that were used primarily for convoy escort duty in the Atlantic. Other United States Navy ships under Coast Guard command included:

- 75 patrol frigates
- 8 Flower-class corvettes
- 22 Troopships
- 20 Amphibious cargo ships
- 9 Attack transports
- 76 Landing Ship, Tank
- 28 Landing Craft Infantry
- 18 gasoline tankers
- 10 Submarine chasers
- 40 Yard patrol boats

In addition to antisubmarine operations, the Coast Guard worked closely with the U.S. Navy and Marine Corps. Many of the coxswains of Coast Guard operated American landing craft, such as the Higgins boat (LCVP), used in amphibious invasions were Coast Guardsmen who had received amphibious training with the cooperation of the U.S. Marine Corps. Coast Guard cutters and ships partially crewed by Coast Guardsmen were used in the North African invasion of November 1942 (Operation Torch) and the invasion of Sicily in 1943 (Operation Husky). Coast Guard crews staffed 22 tankers, 51 large tugs, 6 marine repair ships, and 209 freight and supply vessels for the United States Army.

On 9 September 1942 German submarine U-755 sank USS Muskeget, killing 116 of her crew, one Public Health Service physician, and four civilian Weather Service personnel while on North Atlantic weather patrol.

In November 1942, legislation was passed creating the Coast Guard Women's Reserve, also known as the SPARS. Led by Captain Dorothy C. Stratton, around 11,000 women served in various stateside positions, freeing men for overseas duty.

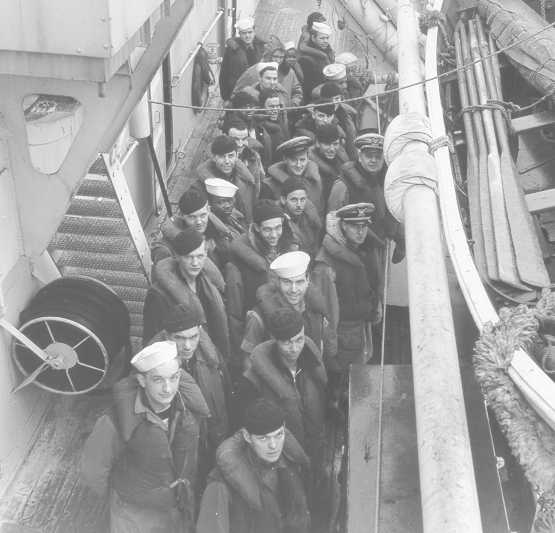
USCGC Escanaba crewmembers on deck early in World War II

On 3 February 1943 the torpedoing of the transport SS Dorchester off the coast of Greenland saw cutters Comanche and Escanaba respond. The frigid water gave the survivors only minutes to live in the cold North Atlantic. With this in mind, the crew of Escanaba used a new rescue technique when pulling survivors from the water. This "retriever" technique used swimmers clad in wet suits to swim to victims in the water and secure a line to them so they could be hauled onto the ship. Escanaba saved 133 men and Comanche saved 97. Escanaba herself was lost to a torpedo or mine a few months later, along with 103 of her 105-man crew.

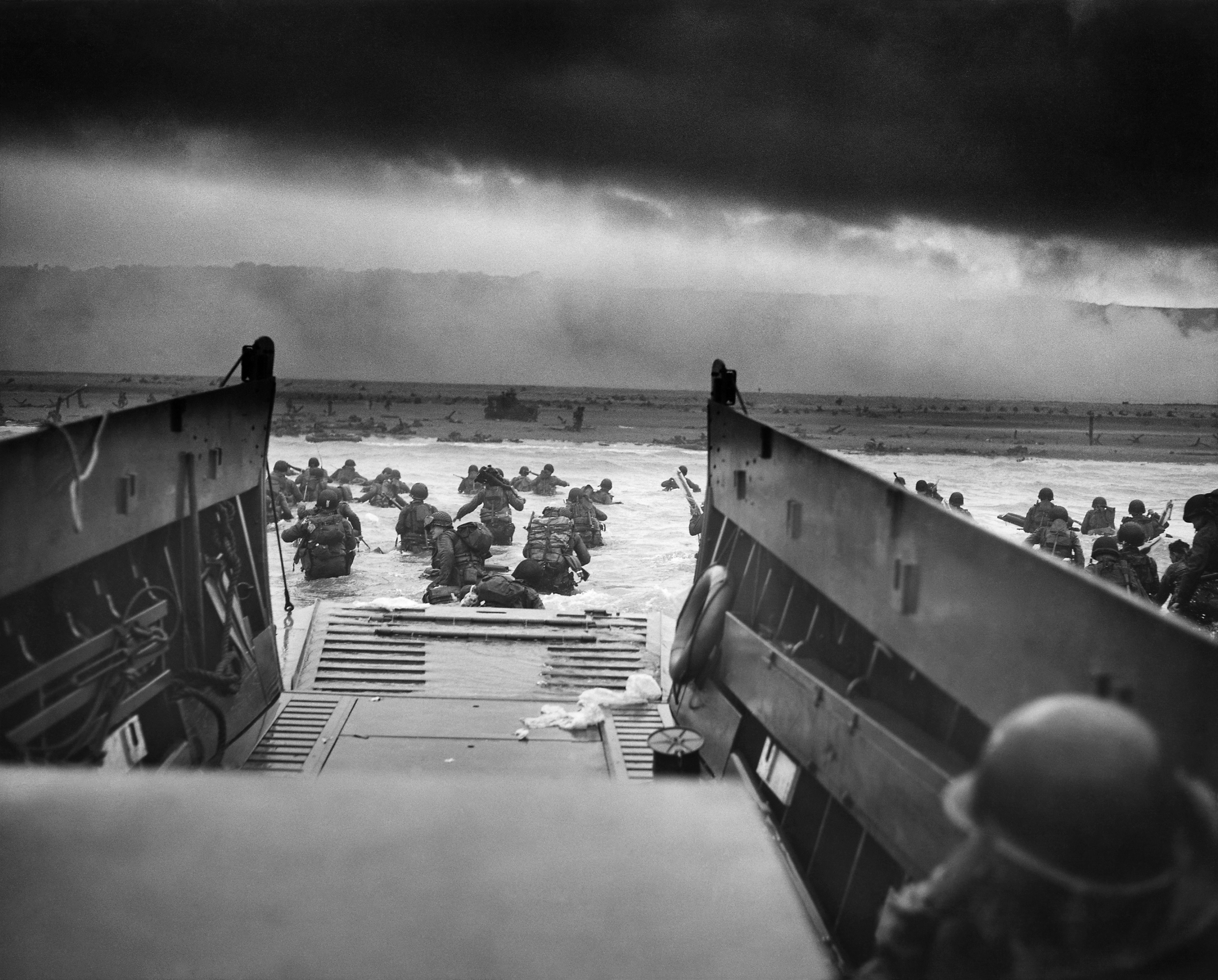
Into the Jaws of Death taken by Coast Guard Chief Photographer's Mate Robert F. Sargent and manned by Coast Guard crew

During the Normandy invasion of 6 June 1944, a 60-cutter flotilla of wooden 83-foot (25 m) Coast Guard cutters, nicknamed the "Matchbox Fleet", cruised off all five landing beaches as combat search-and-rescue boats, saving 400 Allied airmen and sailors. Division O-1, including the Coast Guard-crewed USS Samuel Chase, landed the U.S. Army's 1st Infantry Division on Omaha Beach. Off Utah Beach, the Coast Guard crewed the command ship USS Bayfield. Several Coast Guard-crewed landing craft were lost during D-Day to enemy fire and heavy seas. In addition, a cutter was beached during the storms off the Normandy coast which destroyed the U.S.-operated Mulberry harbor.

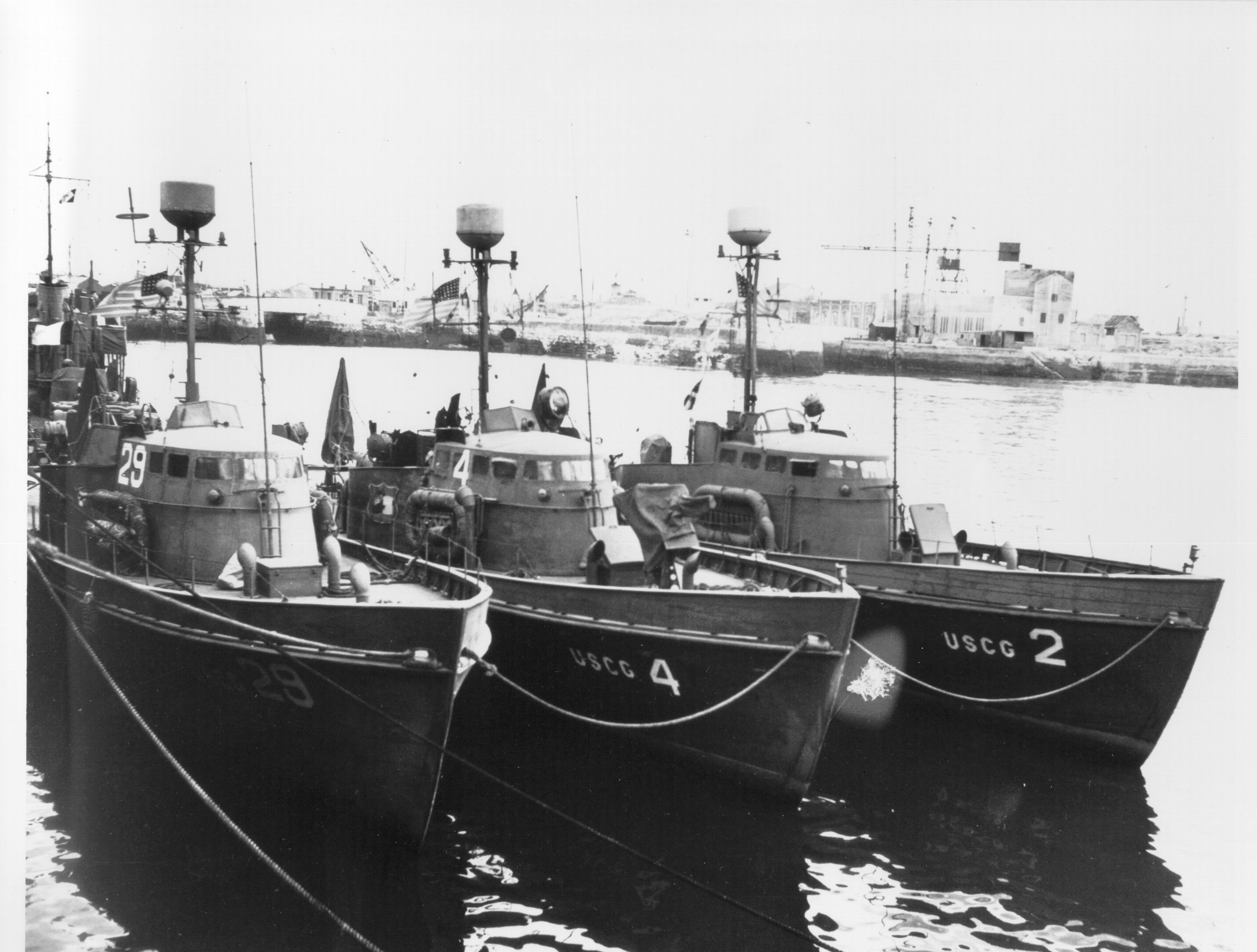
A number of the 60 cutters based in Poole as part of Rescue Flotilla One.

On 27 August 1944, the all Coast Guard-crewed USS LST-327 struck an enemy mine while crossing the English Channel. 22 Coast Guardsmen were killed.

On 12 September 1944, SS George Ade, a Liberty ship, was torpedoed by a German U-boat off Cape Hatteras, North Carolina. USCGC Jackson and USCGC Bedloe, heading to assist the crew of George Ade, were caught in the Great Atlantic Hurricane of 1944 the day after, sinking both cutters and killing 47 Coast Guardsmen. (Note: The Coast Guard's official 1947 history, Lost Cutters, reports a combined total of 47 deaths on the two cutters. However, Silverstein (2006) reports 48 deaths.) A U.S. Navy seaplane rescued the survivors.

On 29 January 1945, USS Serpens, a Coast Guard-crewed Liberty ship, exploded off Guadalcanal, Solomon Islands, while loading depth charges. 193 Coast Guardsmen, 56 Army stevedores, and one U.S. Public Health Service officer were killed in the explosion. This was the biggest single disaster to befall the Coast Guard during the war.

As was common during this period, many of Hollywood's able-bodied screen stars became enlistees and left their film careers on hiatus in order to support the national defense. Specifically, actors Gig Young, Cesar Romero, and Richard Cromwell all served admirably in various capacities in the USCG in the Pacific for several years. The A&P heir Huntington Hartford also served in the Pacific as a commander.

=== Douglas Munro ===
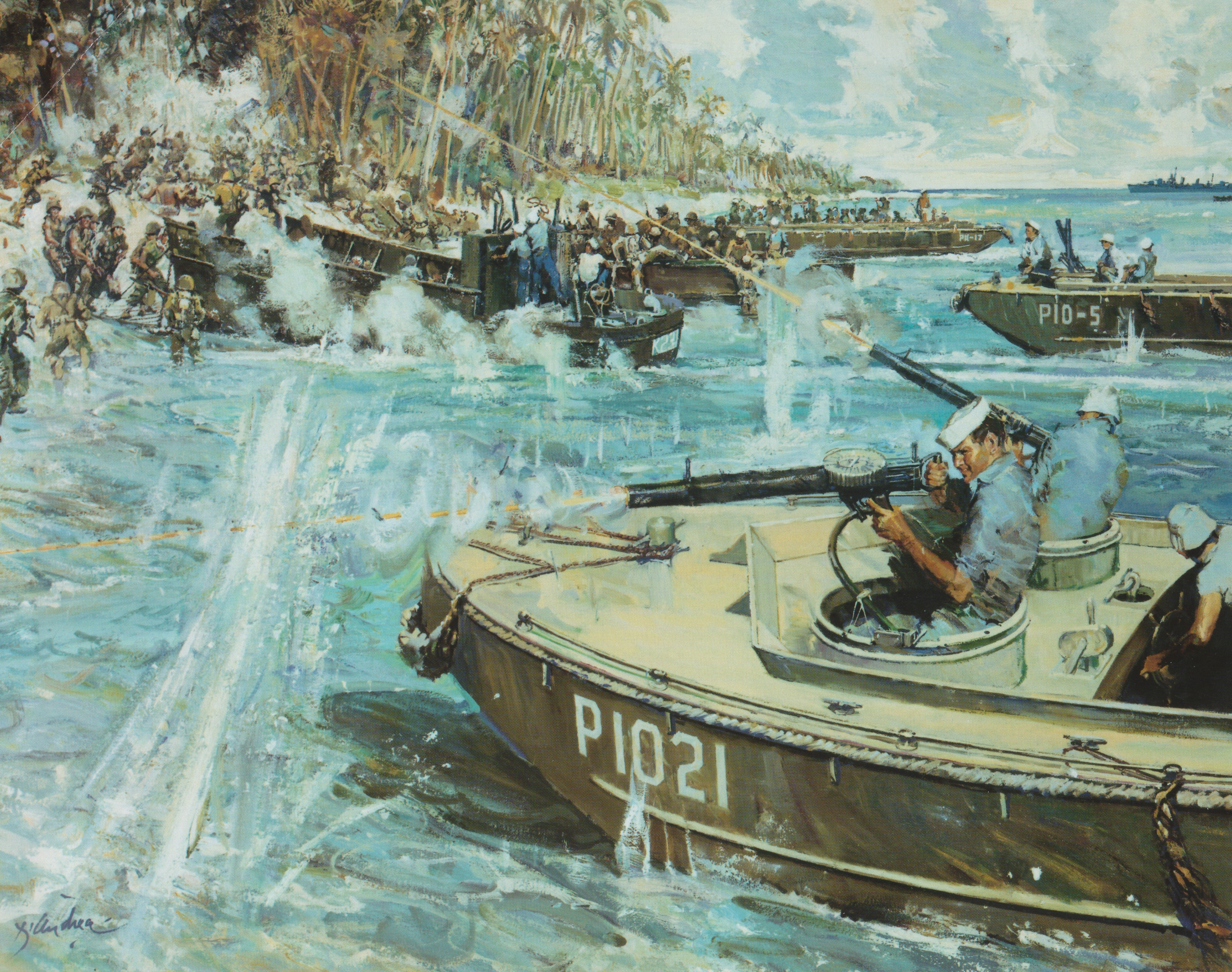
U.S. Coast Guard personnel evacuating U.S. Marines from near Point Cruz on Guadalcanal under fire during Second Battle of the Matanikau River

Signalman 1st Class Douglas Munro (1919–1942), the only Coast Guardsman to receive the Medal of Honor, earned the decoration posthumously during World War II as a small boat coxswain during the Battle of Guadalcanal in 1942. A Navy destroyer escort, USS Douglas A. Munro (DE-422), was named in his honor in 1944. The cutter USCGC Douglas Munro (WHEC-724) was commissioned in 1971 and decommissioned in 2021. The cutter USCGC Munro (WMSL-755) was commissioned in 2017 and is in active service.

=== Bermuda Sky Queen rescue ===
On 14 October 1947, the American-owned Boeing 314 Clipper Bermuda Sky Queen, flew with sixty-nine passengers from Foynes, Ireland to Gander, Newfoundland. Gale-force winds had slowed her progress and she was running low on fuel. Too far from Newfoundland and unable to make it back to Ireland, the captain, twenty-six-year-old ex-Navy pilot Charles Martin, decided to fly toward the cutter USCGC Bibb which was at Ocean Station Charlie in the North Atlantic. Martin decided to ditch and have his passengers and crew picked up by Bibb. In 30-foot (9.1 m) seas, the transfer was both difficult and dangerous. Initially Bibb's captain, Capt. Paul B. Cronk, tried to pass a line to the plane which taxied to the lee side of the cutter. A collision ended this attempt to save the passengers, and with worsening weather, a fifteen-man rubber raft and a small boat were deployed from the ship.

The raft was guided to the escape door of the aircraft. Passengers jumped into the raft which was then pulled to the boat. After rescuing 47 of the passengers, worsening conditions and the approach of darkness forced the rescue's suspension. By dawn, improved weather allowed the rescue to resume and the remaining passengers and crew were transferred to Bibb. The rescue made headlines throughout the country and upon their arrival in Boston, Bibb and her crew received a hero's welcome for having saved all those aboard the ditched Bermuda Sky Queen. This event spurred ratification of the International Civil Aviation Organization (ICAO) treaty establishing a network of ocean weather stations in 1947. A second conference in 1949 reduced the number of Atlantic stations to ten but provided for three Pacific stations.

=== Enlisted training center ===
An enlisted training center was established in Cape May in 1948 and all recruit training functions were consolidated in this facility in 1982, when the West Coast recruit center at Government Island (Alameda), California was closed, the facility repurposed and the island renamed. (See Coast Guard Island).

== The 1950s ==
=== Coast Guard Reserve ===
By 1950, funds were earmarked by Congress for the establishment of a paid drilling Reserve in support of the Coast Guard's recently expanded port security responsibilities. The first organized Coast Guard Reserve unit was formed in Boston in October 1950, setting the framework of today’s Coast Guard Reserve.

=== Korean War ===
During the Korean War, Coast Guard officers helped arrange the evacuation of the Korean Peninsula during the initial North Korean attack. On 9 August 1950, Congress enacted Public Law 679, known as the Magnuson Act. This act charged the Coast Guard with ensuring the security of the United States' ports and harbors on a permanent basis. In addition, the Coast Guard established a series of weather ships in the north Pacific Ocean and assisted civilian and military aircraft and ships in distress, and established a string of LORAN stations in Japan and Korea that assisted the United Nations forces.

=== Pendleton rescue ===
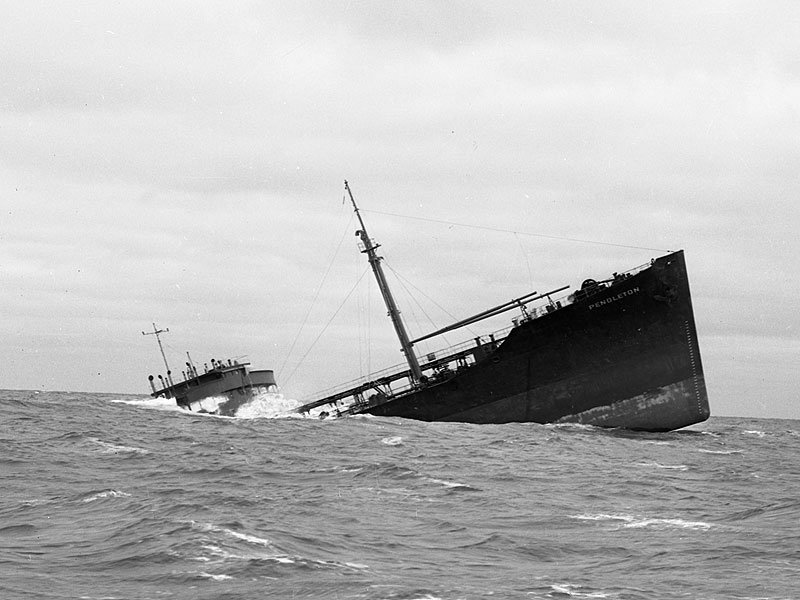
Bow section of Pendleton, 19 February 1952

On 18 February 1952, during a severe "nor'easter" off the New England coast, the T2 tankers Fort Mercer and Pendleton broke in half. Pendleton was unable to make any distress call; she was discovered on the unusual shore radar with which the Chatham, Massachusetts, Lifeboat Station was equipped, during the search for Fort Mercer.

Boatswain's Mate First Class Bernard C. Webber, coxswain of Coast Guard Motor Lifeboat CG 36500 from Station Chatham, and his crew, consisting of Engineman Third Class Andrew Fitzgerald, Seaman Richard Livesey, and Seaman Ervin Maske, rescued the crew from Pendleton's stern section, with Pendleton broken in half. Webber maneuvered the 36-footer under Pendleton's stern as the tanker's crew, trapped in the stern section, abandoned the remains of their ship on a Jacob's ladder. One by one, the men jumped into the water and then were pulled into the lifeboat. Webber and his crew saved 32 of the 41 Pendleton crewmen. Webber, Fitzgerald, Livesey, and Maske were awarded the Gold Lifesaving Medal for their actions.

In all, U.S. Coast Guard vessels, aircraft, and lifeboat stations, working under severe winter conditions, rescued 62 persons from the foundering ships or from the water. Five Coast Guardsmen earned the Gold Lifesaving Medal, four earned the Silver Lifesaving Medal, and 15 earned the Coast Guard Commendation Medal.

The U.S. Coast Guard also conducted a rescue of men from the bow of Fort Mercer, though often overshadowed by the Pendleton rescue. Nine officers and crew were trapped on the bow of Fort Mercer, of whom four were successfully rescued using rafts and a Monomoy surfboat. All the men of the stern were also rescued, and the Fort Mercer stern was eventually towed back to shore and rebuilt, with a new bow, as San Jacinto.

The first of the Coast Guard's Sentinel-class cutters, USCGC Bernard C. Webber, was named in BM1 Webber's honor.

The rescues are portrayed in the 2016 motion picture The Finest Hours, based on the 2009 book by Casey Sherman and Michael J. Tougias.

== The 1960s ==
U.S. Coast Guard Enlisted Personnel 1961-70
Fiscal Year	Totals	Officers	Cadets	Enlisted
1961				
1962				
1963				
1964				
1965	31,776	4,476	440	26,860
1966	35,289	4,783	770	29,736
1967	36,548	5,124	804	30,620
1968	37,392	5,360	830	31,202
1969	39,304	5,638	963	32,703
1970	37,733	5,513	653	31,567

=== Transfer to the Department of Transportation ===
On 1 April 1967 the Coast Guard was transferred from the Department of the Treasury to the newly formed Department of Transportation under the authority of PL 89-670 which was signed into law on 15 October 1966.

=== The Racing Stripe ===
In 1967, the Coast Guard adopted the red and blue "racing stripe" as part of the regular insignia for cutters, boats, and aircraft. It was recommended by the industrial design firm of Raymond Loewy/William Snaith, Inc. to give Coast Guard units and vessels a distinctive appearance, as well as clearer recognition from a distance. This "racing stripe" was in turn adopted (in modified forms) by several other coast guards, in particular the Canadian Coast Guard.

=== Vietnam War ===
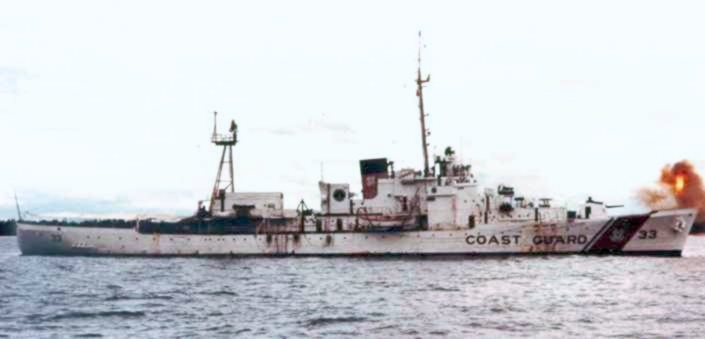
USCGC Duane shelling targets in Vietnam, circa 1967

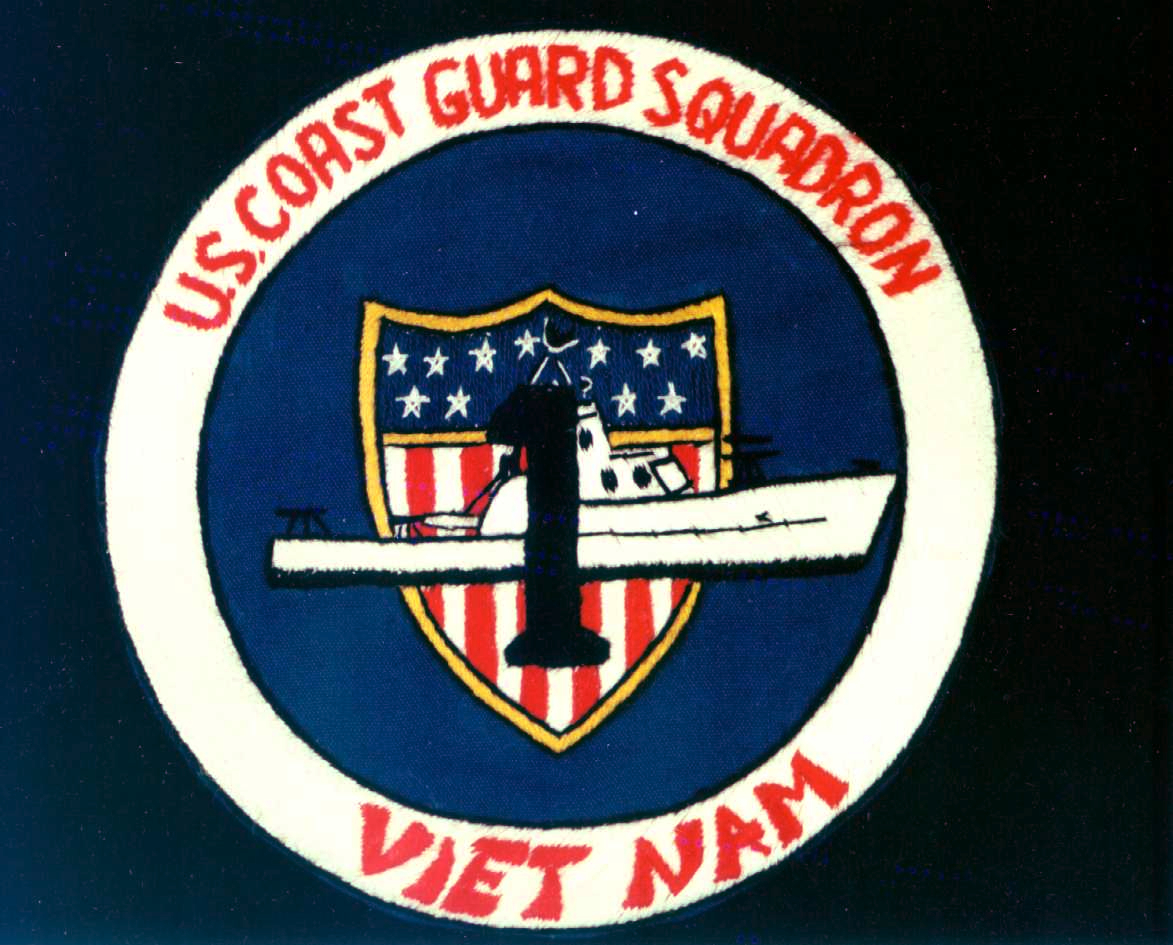
Squadron One unit patch

The Coast Guard was active in the Vietnam War beginning 27 May 1965 with the formation of Coast Guard Squadron One consisting of Divisions 11 and 12. Squadron One assisted in Operation Market Time by interdicting resupply by sea of Viet Cong and North Vietnamese forces. The Coast Guard developed a "piggyback" weapon that proved highly useful; an M2 Browning machine gun placed over a 81mm mortar. Seventeen Point class 82-foot WPB cutters were transferred to coastal waters off Vietnam with their Coast Guard crews under the operational control of the U.S. Navy Seventh Fleet. The first eight Squadron One cutters arrived at Danang on 20 July and were designated Division 12. Division 11 consisting of the remaining nine cutters arrived at An Thoi on 1 August. Division 13, consisting of nine additional WPB's arrived for duty at Cat Lo on 22 February 1966. Squadron One cutters were awarded the Navy Presidential Unit Citation for their assistance provided the Navy during Operation Sealords.

Coast Guard Squadron Three was established on 24 April 1967 in support of Operation Market Time and consisted initially of five high endurance cutters (WHEC) tasked to the Seventh Fleet for used in coastal interdiction and naval gunfire support for shore operations in South Vietnam. The first five cutters arrived on 4 May

Several Coast Guard aviators served with the U.S. Air Force 37th Aerospace Rescue and Recovery Squadron and 40th Aerospace Rescue and Recovery Squadron in Southeast Asia from 1968 to 1972. They were involved in combat search and rescue operations in both Vietnam and Laos.

The Coast Guard provided Explosive Loading Detachments (ELD) to the United States Army 1st Logistics Command in several locations in Vietnam. The ELD's were responsible for the supervision of Army stevedores in the unloading of explosives and ammunition from U.S. Merchant Marine ships. The ELD's were also responsible for assisting the Army in port security operations at each port and eventually were made a part of a Port Security and Waterways Detail (PS&WD) reporting to the Commanding General, United States Army, Vietnam (USARV). They earned the Army Meritorious Unit Commendation for their efforts.

On 13 December 1965 Secretary of Defense Robert McNamara requested Coast Guard assistance in constructing a chain of LORAN-C stations for use by naval vessels and combat aircraft for operations in Southeast Asia. Construction started almost immediately at five locations in Thailand and Vietnam and they were fully operational on 28 October 1966.

On 22 April 1966, USCGC Planetree (WLB-307) arrived in Cam Ranh Bay to commence Aids to Navigation (ATON) operations in the coastal waters of South Vietnam. She was responsible for the marking of freshly cut channels and harbors with buoys and daymarks so that merchant and naval ships could safely navigate the waters. This direct support mission ended on 17 May 1971 with the departure of the last buoy tender, USCGC Blackhaw. The buoy tender crews were tasked with training South Vietnamese crews in the ATON effort prior to the departure of Blackhaw as a part of the 'Vietnamization' policy of the Nixon Administration. After May 1971 ATON was serviced on a 'as needed' basis by USCGC Basswood (WLB-388) homeported in Guam.

In August 1970 the Coast Guard finished turning over to the South Vietnamese Navy the patrol boats of Squadron One. The training of South Vietnamese crews had started in February 1969 and continued through to the end of operations for Squadron One. USCGC Yakutat (WHEC-380) and USCGC Bering Strait (WHEC-382) were turned over to the South Vietnamese Navy on 1 January 1971. Eventually three other WHECs were turned over to the South Vietnamese Navy. The Coast Guard's involvement in the Vietnam War ended at 1246 local time 29 April 1975 when LORAN Station Con Son went off the air for good. Its signal was necessary for the safe evacuation of Saigon by U.S. Embassy personnel in the final days before the fall of the South Vietnamese government and it was kept on the air as long as possible. On 3 October 1975 the Coast Guard disestablished the remaining LORAN-C stations in Thailand.

Seven Coast Guardsmen were killed during the war in combat and search and rescue operations. Additionally, the U.S. Department of Veterans Affairs has determined that Coast Guard veterans who served aboard designated vessels while deployed to Vietnam during the war are "eligible for the presumption of Agent Orange herbicide exposure". The vessels include U.S. Coast Guard Patrol Boats (WPBs), High Endurance Cutters (WHECs), Buoy Tenders (WLBs), and Cargo Vessels (WAKs).

== The 1970s ==
=== The "New Guard" ===
In the mid-70s the Coast Guard adopted the blue uniforms seen today, replacing Navy-style uniforms worn prior to the Vietnam War. Known jocularly as "Bender's Blues," they were implemented as part of the postwar transition to an all-volunteer force. It is noteworthy that the enlisted's and officer's uniforms differed only in rank insignia and cap devices, reflecting the value the service placed on its enlisted members (although it caused saluting confusion among members of other services). The stylish new women's uniform was created by Hollywood costume designer Edith Head, upon the request of Capt. Eleanor L'Ecuyer. Enlisted uniform buttons were gold while officer's buttons were silver. This was the opposite of most military services. In 1973 women were integrated into the active-duty Coast Guard and the Coast Guard Reserve. The SPARS ended and those in it were sent to the Coast Guard Reserve. The modification of 378's for mixed-gender crews began in 1977, and the opening of all ratings to women occurred in 1978. These stages of integration preceded the DOD military by roughly a year or so, as separate legislation restricted their deployment of women.

Altogether, the shift from Treasury to the DOT in 1967, the uniform change, the end of Ocean Station service, growth of the shore-side establishment by newly added missions, the steady if belated retirement of venerable but aging World War II cutters, and gender integration marked the end of the "Old Guard" ("wooden ships and men of steel").

The Ancient Order of the Pterodactyl was founded in 1977 in order to preserve the history of Coast Guard aviation, as the service's last amphibious seaplane, the Grumman Albatross or "Goat," was nearing retirement, as was also the service's last enlisted pilot, John P. Greathouse.

=== End of ocean stations, beginning of the 200 nautical miles (370 km) limit ===
One major mission of the service, maintaining Ocean Stations, came to an end as improvements in oceanic aviation (turbojet airliners and improved radionavigation) obviated the need. However, the Magnuson–Stevens Fisheries Conservation and Management Act of 1976 brought an increase in offshore fisheries patrols, to which the newer WHECs (the 378s) were redeployed, as the aging boiler-powered World War II-vintage wooden-deckers were gradually retired.

=== The Kudirka incident ===
On 23 November 1970, Simonas "Simas" Kudirka leapt from the Soviet mother ship Sovetskaya Litva onto USCGC Vigilant. The 400-foot (120 m) Sovetskaya Litva was anchored in U.S. waters near Martha's Vineyard Island. Kudirka was a Soviet seaman of Lithuanian nationality. The Soviets accused Kudirka of theft of 3,000 rubles from the ship's safe. Ten hours passed; communications difficulties contributed to the delay, as the ship was unfortunately in a "blind spot" of Boston Radio's (Marshfield) receivers, resulting in an awkward resort to using the public marine operator.

After attempts to get the U.S. State Department to provide guidance failed, Rear Admiral William B. Ellis, commander of the First Coast Guard District, ordered Commander Ralph W. Eustis to permit a KGB detachment to board Vigilant to return Kudirka to the Soviet ship. This led to a change in asylum policy by the U.S. Coast Guard. Admiral Ellis and his chief of staff were given administrative punishment under Article 15 of the UCMJ. Commander Eustis was given a non-punitive letter of reprimand and assigned to shore duty. Kudirka himself was tried for treason by the Soviet Union and given a ten-year sentence in prison. Subsequent investigations revealed that Kudirka could claim American citizenship through his mother and he was allowed to go to the United States in 1974.

The incident, known for several years as the Coast Guard's "Day of Shame," was portrayed in a 1978 television movie The Defection of Simas Kudirka, with Alan Arkin playing Kudirka and Donald Pleasence playing the captain of the Soviet ship, and USCGC Decisive serving as the USCGC Vigilant. It was also the subject of the 1973 book Day of Shame: The truth about the murderous happenings aboard the Cutter Vigilant during the Russian-American confrontation off Martha's Vineyard by Algis Ruksenas. The incident is the premise of Giedrė Žickytė's 2020 documentary film The Jump (Šuolis), which screened as part of the 2020 online edition of DOC NYC.

=== The Rescue of AF586 ===
At 1430 on 26 October 1978, "Alfa Foxtrot 586", a Navy P-3C flying with a crew of fifteen on a reconnaissance mission from the VP-9 detachment at Naval Station Adak, Alaska, ditched near position 52°39′N 167°24′E (approximately 290 miles west of Shemya Island in the Aleutians) following a propeller malfunction and succession of engine fires in its number one engine. VP 9's Aircraft Accident Report recorded conditions at the time of ditching as "1500 foot ceiling, one and one-half to three miles visibility in rain showers, wave height 12-20 feet, winds 223 degrees at 43 knots." Water temperature was approximately 40 degrees. The aircraft sank within 90 seconds.

The crew of Coast Guard HC-130H CGNR 1500 were instrumental in saving the lives of ten crew members from Navy P3C PD-2 "Alfa Foxtrot 586" (Bureau No. 159892) after that aircraft ditched in the North Pacific Ocean west of Shemya Island on 26 October 1978. Arriving on scene after dark in turbulent weather, CG 1500 marked the reported position of the survivors' rafts with a buoy and smoke floats, proceeded to and established communications with a Soviet fishing vessel, Mys Sinyavin, located approximately 25 miles west of datum, and then directed that vessel to both rafts, ultimately resulting in the rescue of ten survivors and the recovery of three dead crewmembers from AF 586. The latter died from exposure after approximately ten - twelve hours in the water-laden rafts, and it is unlikely that the other ten crewmembers could have survived in their rafts much longer as they were all in the advanced stages of hypothermia when rescued by Mys Sinyavin.

== The 1980s ==
U.S. Coast Guard Enlisted Personnel 1981-90
Fiscal Year	Totals	Officers	Cadets	Enlisted
1981	39,760	6,519	981	32,269
1982	38,248	6,431	902	30,915
1983	39,708	6,535	811	32,362
1984	38,705	6,790	759	31,156
1985	38,595	6,775	733	31,087
1986	37,284	6,577	754	29,953
1987	38,576	6,644	859	31,073
1988	37,723	6,530	887	30,306
1989	37,453	6,614	867	29,972
1990				

=== The Blackthorn Tragedy ===
On 28 January 1980, the 180-foot buoy tender USCGC Blackthorn collided with the 605-foot (184 m) oil tanker Capricorn and capsized when Capricorn's anchor entangled the cutter. Twenty-three Coast Guardsmen were drowned. Coming shortly after the loss of 11 men in the collision/sinking of the OCS training ship USCGC Cuyahoga, the impact of this disaster upon morale in the close-knit service was magnified.

=== Prinsendam rescue ===
On 4 October 1980, the Coast Guard and Canadian Coast Guard were involved in the rescue of the passengers and crew of the Dutch cruise ship Prinsendam in the Gulf of Alaska.

A fire broke out on Prinsendam off Yakutat, Alaska on 4 October 1980. Prinsendam was 130 miles (210 km) from the nearest air strip. The cruise ship's captain ordered the ship abandoned and the passengers, many elderly, left the ship in the lifeboats. Coast Guard and Canadian helicopters and the cutters USCGC Boutwell, USCGC Mellon, and USCGC Woodrush responded in concert with other vessels in the area. The passenger vessel later capsized and sank. The rescue is particularly important because of the distance traveled by the rescuers, the coordination of independent organizations and the fact that all 520 passengers and crew were rescued without loss of life or serious injury.

=== Marine Electric sinking ===
On 12 February 1983, the cargo ship Marine Electric sank in a storm off the coast of Virginia. Despite efforts by multiple Coast Guard and Navy vessels, most of the crew were lost. As a result of this, the Coast Guard undertook massive review of its rescue procedures, its ship inspection procedures, and its requirements for safety equipment aboard ships.

Some of the reforms that resulted included the items below.

- greater attention to inspection of deck hatch covers during ship inspections.
- requirement for all ships to provide equipment for survival in cold water for all ship's crew personnel.
- the establishment of the Coast Guard rescue swimmer program in 1984, in order to greatly improve readiness and training for all rescue swimmers.

=== The Mariel boatlift ===
In April 1980, the government of Cuba began to allow any person who wanted to leave Cuba to assemble in Mariel Harbor and take their own transport. The U.S. Coast Guard, working out of Seventh District Headquarters in Miami, Florida, rescued boats in difficulty, inspected vessels for adequate safety equipment, and processed refugees. This task was made even more difficult by a hurricane which swamped many vessels in mid-ocean and by the lack of cooperation by Cuban Border Guard officials. By May, 600 reservists had been called up, the U.S. Navy provided assistance between Cuba and Key West, and the Auxiliary was heavily involved. 125,000 refugees were processed between April and May 1980. (See Mariel boatlift.)

=== The end of the lightships ===
The number of lightships steadily decreased during the 20th century, some replaced by "Texas Tower" type structures (e.g., Chesapeake, Buzzards Bay, both now automated) , and others by buoys. However, the Columbia River and Nantucket Shoals Lightships were not replaced by large navigational buoys (LNBs) until 1979 and 1983, respectively, due to the difficulty of anchoring buoys securely at their heavy-weather locations. .

The technology of all aids to navigation evolved dramatically during this era, reducing manning and maintenance requirements. The Coast Guard also managed the worldwide VLF OMEGA Navigation System and operated two of its stations from the early 1970s until its termination in 1997 (having been superseded, though not truly obsoleted, by GPS).

=== Drug War at sea escalates ===
During the 1980s, Coast Guard cutters and aircraft were increasingly deployed to intervene drugs far offshore. While the service has interdicted contraband since its inception, the "Drug War" was the biggest effort since Prohibition. Though the Drug War began before the 1980s and continues to this day, it was during the 1980s that the Coast Guard, working with the Drug Enforcement Administration and other law enforcement agencies, used a blend of new and old laws to interdict far from the shores of the United States. Formerly, it was more difficult to prosecute cases involving seizures made beyond 24 nautical miles from shore. President Ronald Reagan's efforts to secure funding for federal agencies and courts to prosecute cases got the Coast Guard's attention. The Coast Guard instituted a "no tolerance" policy toward drugs, began testing its own employees for drug use, and required that all boardings be carried out by trained and armed boarding officers and petty officers. The Caribbean was the focus of efforts in the 1980s, but in recent years the major drug busts at sea have been occurring more in the waters of the Pacific Ocean between California and Peru.

=== Libyan attack on LORAN Station Lampedusa ===
On 15 April 1986, Libya fired two Scuds at the U.S. Coast Guard radio navigation station on the Italian island of Lampedusa, in retaliation for the American bombing of Tripoli and Benghazi. However, the missiles passed over the island, landing in the sea, and caused no damage. As a result of the attack, the Coast Guard station was commissioned as a NATO base, including security hardening and an armory, as well as an Italian security detail stationed nearby.

=== Exxon Valdez oil spill ===
In March 1989, the oil tanker Exxon Valdez struck Prince William Sound's Bligh Reef and spilled 260,000 to 750,000 barrels (41,000 to 119,000 m3) of crude oil. Because the incident took place in navigational waters, the Coast Guard had authority for all activities relating to the cleanup effort. The Coast Guard largely served as the Federal On-Scene Coordinator between Exxon Mobil and all of these organizations, acting within authority under the Clean Water Act.

Coast Guard cutters were one of the first to respond to the spill, quickly establishing a safety zone around the stricken Exxon Valdez. At least eleven cutters were present in April 1989, the majority of them overseeing booming and skimming operations. Early that month, Coast Guard vessel activity went through a rapid buildup phase. The Coast Guard maintained a heavy cutter presence for two weeks in mid-April and then reduced it towards the end of the month. Four or five cutters were on hand in early May and that number was reduced to two or three by the end of the month. Three cutters were assigned to cleanup operations by the beginning of June, but only one remained two weeks later – and it stayed that way for the remainder of the 1989 response.

Several C-130s from Coast Guard Air Station Kodiak airlifted more than 11 1/4 tons of cleanup equipment by 10 April 1989. HU-25 Falcon jets from Coast Guard Air Station Cape Cod flew twice a day tracking oil with side-looking radar equipment. Five Coast Guard helicopters also assisted thirty-nine skimmers working in Prince William Sound.

== The 1990s ==
U.S. Coast Guard Enlisted Personnel 1991-2000
Fiscal Year	Total	Officers	Cadets	Enlisted
1991	38,377	7,192	900	30,285
1992	39,388	7,507	919	30,962
1993	39,234	7,628	907	30,699
1994	37,802	7,656	881	29,265
1995	36,731	7,462	841	28,401
1996	35,229	7,270	830	27,129
1997	34,890	7,100	845	26,945
1998	35,293	7,119	811	27,363
1999				
2000				

=== '90 Operation Desert Shield ===
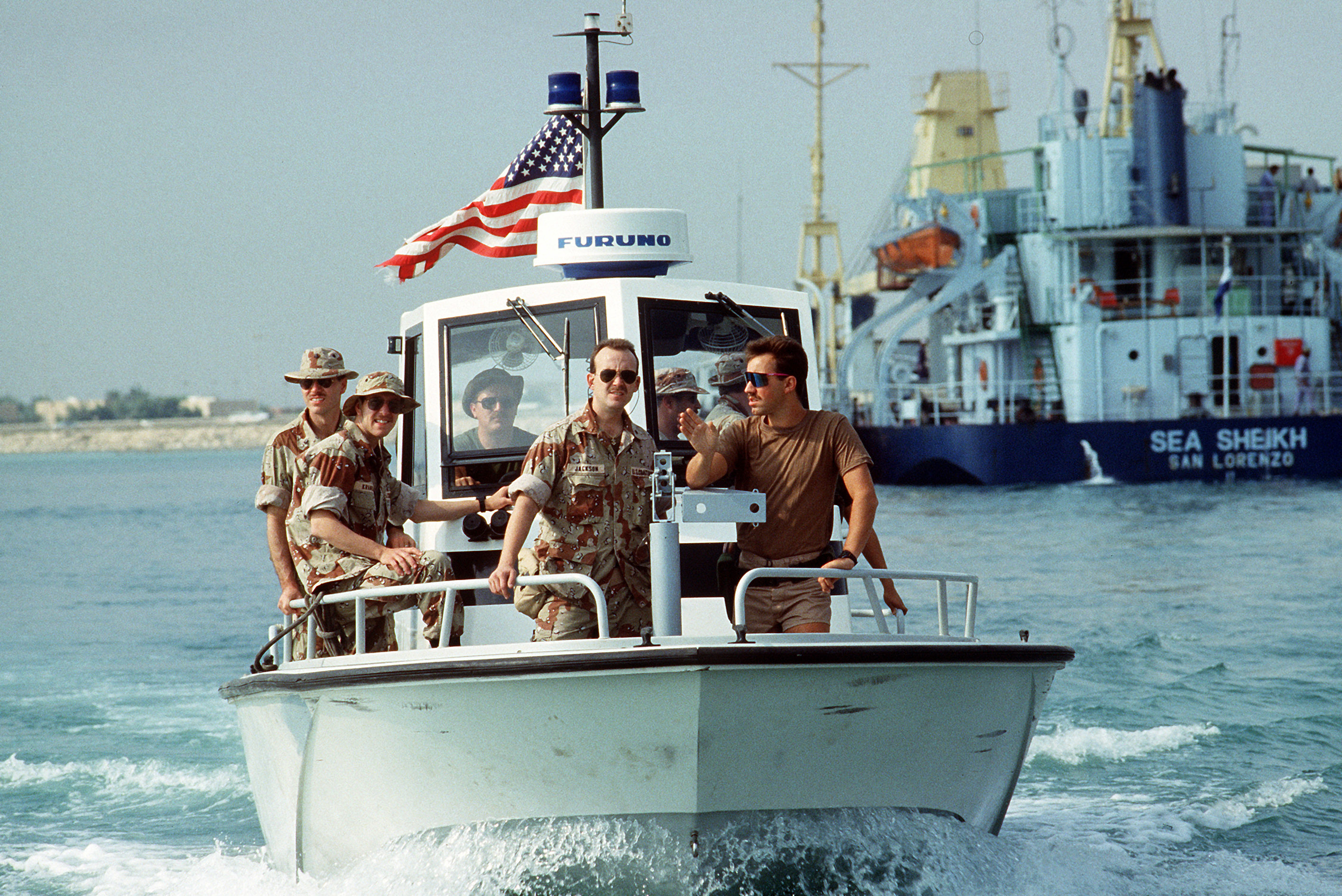
Members of Port Security Unit 302 patrol the harbor aboard a Navy harbor patrol boat during Operation Desert Shield.

On 17 August 1990, at the request of the Joint Chiefs of Staff; the Secretary of Transportation and the Commandant of the Coast Guard committed Coast Guard Law Enforcement Detachments (LEDET) to Operation Desert Shield. A total of 10 four-person teams served in-theater to support the enforcement of UN sanctions by the Maritime Interdiction Forces. About 60 percent of the 600 boardings carried out by U.S. forces were either led by or supported with the LEDETs. Additionally, a 7-man liaison staff was designated by the Commandant as Operational Commander for the Coast Guard forces deployed in theater. The first boarding of an Iraqi vessel in the theater of operations conducted by a LEDET occurred on 30 August 1990. President George H. W. Bush, on 22 August 1990, authorized the call up of members of the selected reserve to active duty in support of Operation Desert Shield. Three Port Security Units (PSU), consisting of 550 Coast Guard reservists are ordered to the Persian Gulf in support of Operation Desert Shield. This was the first involuntary overseas mobilization of Coast Guard Reserve PSUs in the Coast Guard Reserve's 50-year history. A total of 950 Coast Guard reservists were called to active duty.

=== '91 Operation Desert Storm ===
Prior to the launch of Operation Desert Storm, Coast Guard LEDET personnel aboard the USS Nicholas (FFG-47) assisted when the frigate cleared eleven Iraqi oil platforms and took 23 prisoners on 18 January 1991. On 21 April 1991, a Tactical Port Security Boat (TPSB) of PSU 301, stationed in Al Jubayl, Saudi Arabia, was the first boat in the newly reopened harbor of Mina Ash Shuwaikh in Kuwait City. Because of certain security concerns, a determination was made to send one of the 22-foot Raider boats belonging to PSU 301 and armed with M2 and M60 machine guns, to lead the procession into the harbor and provide security for the operation.

During the war, Saddam Hussein's Iraqi army was seeking to pollute the Persian Gulf by pouring oil into in an effort only partly stymied when Air Force F-111F Aardvarks bombed the source of the deliberate spill. A giant slick was spreading rapidly, wreaking environmental havoc and threatening Saudi desalinization plants that supplied potable water for coalition troops. Two HU-25B Guardians from Coast Guard Air Station Cape Cod, Mass., were dispatched 13 Feb 1991, supported by two HC-130H Hercules from CGAS Clearwater Florida, Operating from Saudi and Bahraini airfields. The HC-130s brought in supplies and returned to the United States 25 Feb.. The HU-25Bs flew over the oil spill to monitor dispersion, rate of flow, the effects of weather and currents, and other data essential for preparing a response plan.

=== Operation Buckshot, "The Great Flood of '93" ===
During April and again in June 1993, Coast Guard Forces St. Louis (CGF)was activated for flooding on the Mississippi, Missouri and Illinois River basins. The '500 year' flooding closed over 1,250 miles (2,000 km) of river to navigation and claimed 47 lives. Historic levels of rainfall in the river tributaries caused many levee breaks along the Missouri and Mississippi Rivers displacing thousands of people from their homes and businesses. The commander of CGF St. Louis set into motion a preconceived operations plan to deal with the many requests for assistance from state and local governments for law enforcement assistance, help with sandbagging, water rescues, evacuation of flood victims, and aerial surveillance of levee conditions. The unprecedented duration of the flood also caused Coast Guard personnel to assume some humanitarian services not normally a part of flood operations. Food, water and sandbags were transported to work sites to assist sandbagging efforts by local governments. Red Cross and Salvation Army relief workers were given transportation assistance. Many homeless animals displaced by the flood waters were rescued and turned over to local animal shelters. Utility repair crews were assisted with transportation of personnel and repair parts. Disaster Response Units (DRU) were formed from active duty and reserve units throughout the Second Coast Guard District and consisted of eight members equipped with three 16-foot flood punts powered by 25 horsepower outboard motors. The DRU's accounted for 1517 boat sorties and 3342 hours of underway operations. Coast Guard helicopters from CG Air Stations in Traverse City and Detroit, Michigan; Chicago, Illinois; Elizabeth City, North Carolina; and Mobile, Alabama provided search and rescue, logistical support and aerial survey intelligence. The Coast Guard Auxiliary provided three fixed wing aircraft. There were 473 aircraft sorties with 570 hours of aircraft operations. CGF St. Louis stood down from the alert phase of operations on 27 August. A total of 380 Active Duty, 352 Reserve, 179 Auxiliary, and 5 Coast Guard civilians were involved in the operation.

=== 1994 Cuban boat rescues ===
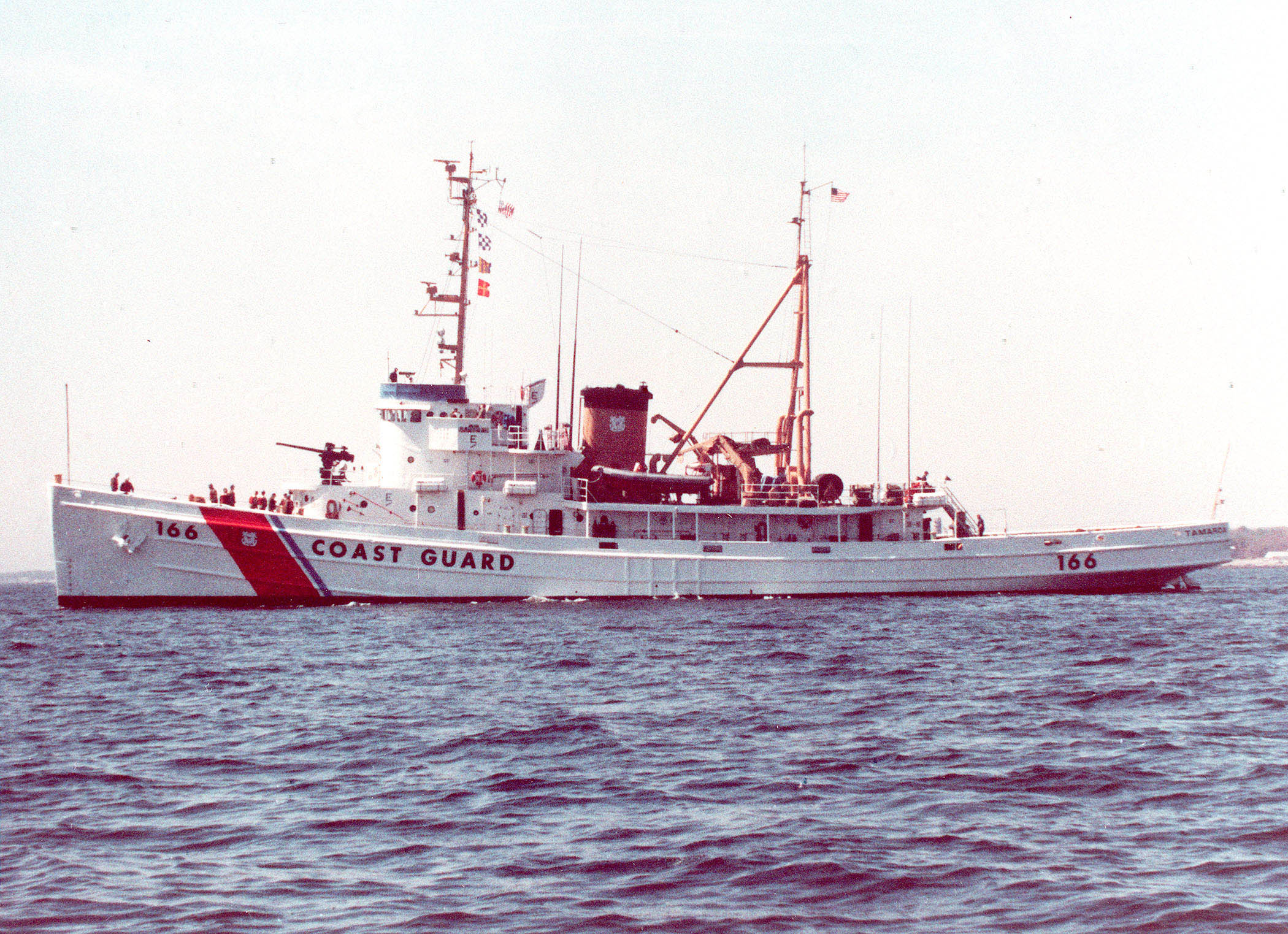
USCGC Tamaroa, best known for her rescues during the "Perfect Storm" of 1991.

In 1994, about 38,000 Cubans attempted to sail from Cuba to Florida, many on homemade rafts. The Coast Guard and Navy performed intensive search and rescue efforts to rescue rafters at sea. Sixteen 110-foot (34 m) cutters—half the complement of the Coast Guard—were involved in this operation, as well as buoy tenders not normally assigned to high seas duty. Due to a change in Presidential policy, rescued Cubans were sent to the U.S. Naval Station at Guantanamo Bay, Cuba.

=== 1999 Kosovo ===
In the summer of 1999, USCGC Bear (WMEC-901) deployed to the Adriatic Sea in support of Operation Allied Force and Operation Noble Anvil with the USS Theodore Roosevelt (CVN-71) Battle Group providing surface surveillance and SAR response for the Sea Combat Commander, and force protection for the Amphibious Ready Group operating near Albania. Bear also provided security to the US Army vessels transporting military cargo between Italy and Albania. This escort operation took Bear up to the Albanian coastline, well within enemy surface-to-surface missile range. Bear earned the Kosovo Campaign Medal and the NATO Kosovo Medal.

== The 2000s ==
=== Transfer to the Department of Homeland Security ===
The Coast Guard was transferred from the Department of Transportation to the Department of Homeland Security on 1 March 2003 under the Homeland Security Act (Public Law No. 107-296).

In 2002, the Coast Guard sent several 110-foot (34 m) cutters to the Persian Gulf to enforce the U.N. embargo on goods to and from Iraq. Port Security Units and Naval Coastal Warfare units also accompanied the U.S. military buildup.

=== Wars in Iraq and Afghanistan ===
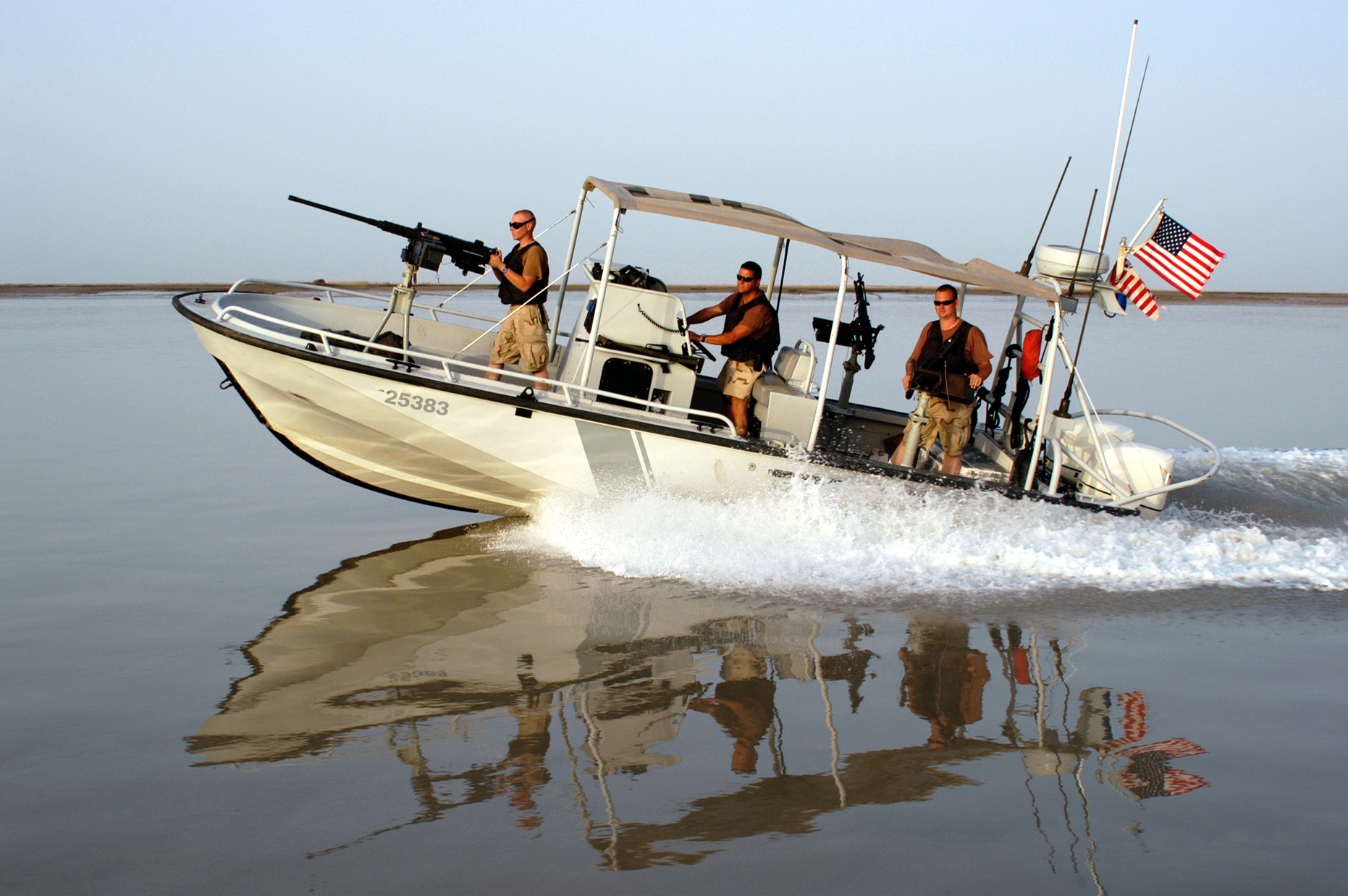
US Coast Guard Port Security Unit patrols Umm Qasr

During Operation Iraqi Freedom and Operation Enduring Freedom, the Coast Guard had deployed its largest contingent of Coast Guardsmen and assets overseas since the Vietnam War. Coast Guard cutters primarily assisted in force protection and search and seizures of suspected smugglers in Iraqi and international waters, often in close proximity to Iran. Military trainers improved the capabilities of the Iraqi Navy and other government forces in core competencies and maritime law enforcement. The Coast Guard also sent military advisors to Iraq to provide technical assistance to Iraqi officials on the implementation of international port security standards and requirements. The USCGC Walnut (WLB-205) conducted an assessment of Iraq's river and coastal navigational aids, such as buoys, and then replaced or corrected the aids in order to allow for the safe navigation of the Khor Abd Allah River flowing up to the port of Umm Qasr for military, humanitarian and commercial vessels.

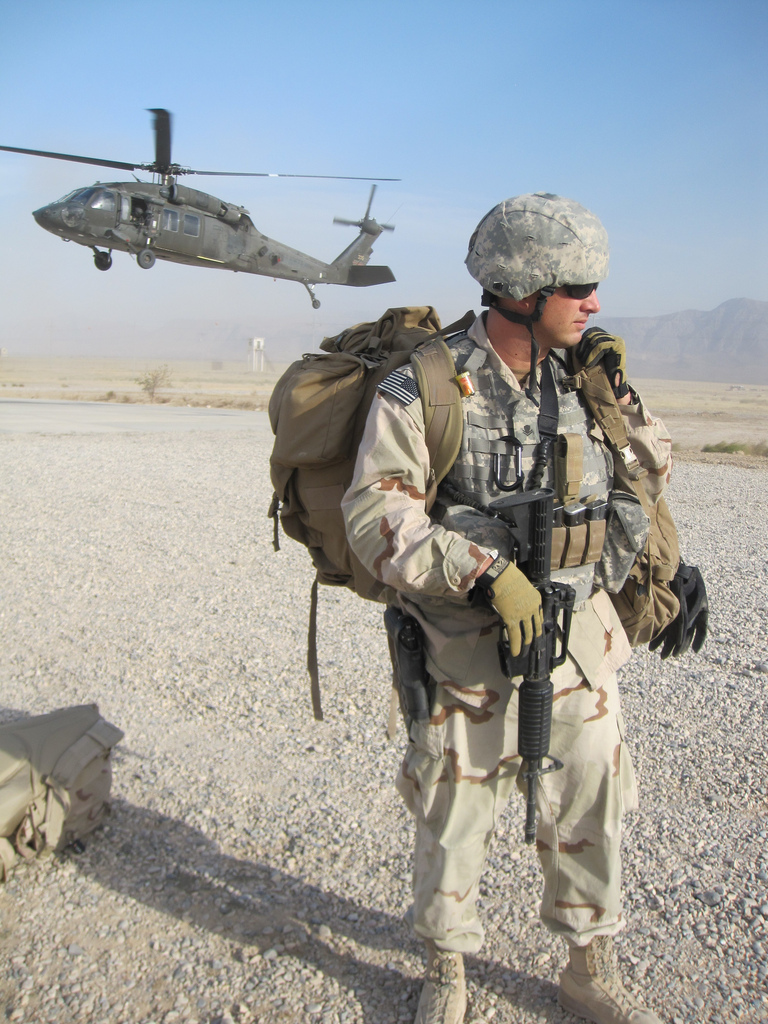
USCG RAID team member sent to inspect cargo containers for proper loading and labeling of hazardous materials.

The Coast Guard sent Redeployment Assistance and Inspection Detachment (RAID) teams to both Iraq and Afghanistan. The teams assisted the units of other services with the proper declaration, classification, labeling and packaging of container shipments as well as the inspection of containers for structural integrity to ensure each one is seaworthy to cut down on potential shipping problems. In addition, the Coast Guard provided multiple men and women as a part of intelligence and cyber detachments across Afghanistan.

On 24 April 2004, Petty Officer 3rd Class Nathan B. Bruckenthal, 24, from the USS Firebolt (PC-10), became the first Coast Guardsman to die in a combat zone since the Vietnam War. He was killed in a suicide boat attack on a Basra oil terminal off the coast of Iraq as the crew of Firebolt performed their maritime security mission.

At the height its involvement in both wars, the Coast Guard deployed over 1,200 men and women, including about 500 reservists, 11 ships (two large cutters, a buoy tender, and eight patrol boats), 4 port-security units, law enforcement detachments, and other specialized teams and support staff in order to perform a wide range of operations in Iraq, Afghanistan, Kuwait, and the Persian Gulf.

Coast Guard units and personnel – both active and reserve component – continue to deploy to the Middle East region even after the end of Operation Iraqi Freedom and Operation New Dawn. The Coast Guard is charged with providing harbor defense and security to ports, seaward approaches, and waterways within U.S. Central Command's area of responsibility and ensuring the free flow of personnel, equipment and commerce in the region.

=== Hurricane Katrina ===
After Hurricane Katrina in August 2005, the Coast Guard dispatched a number of helicopters, fixed-wing aircraft, small boats, and Auxiliary aircraft as well as 25 cutters to the Gulf Coast, rescuing 2,000 people in two days, and around 33,500 people in all. The crews also assessed storm damage to offshore oil platforms and refineries. More than 2,400 personnel from all districts conducted search, rescue, response, waterway reconstitution and environmental impact assessment operations. In total, the Coast Guard air and boat rescued more than 33,500 people and assisted with the joint-agency evacuation of an additional 9,400 patients and medical personnel from hospitals in the Gulf coast region.

In May 2006, at the Change of Command ceremony when Admiral Thad Allen took over as Commandant, President George W. Bush awarded the entire Coast Guard, including the Coast Guard Auxiliary, the Presidential Unit Citation for its efforts after Hurricane Katrina.

=== HC-130 #1705 crash ===
On 29 October 2009, Coast Guard HC-130 aircraft No. 1705 with seven crewmembers, based at Coast Guard Air Station Sacramento, collided with a United States Marine Corps (USMC) AH-1 Cobra helicopter with two crewmembers 15 miles (24 km) east of San Clemente Island. Both aircraft crashed into the ocean and all nine crewmembers in both aircraft are believed to have perished. The C-130 was searching for a missing boater while the USMC aircraft was heading towards a military training area in company with another Cobra and two CH-53 Sea Stallions from Marine Corps Air Station Miramar. An investigation found no one directly responsible for the crash.

== The 2010s ==
=== CG-6535 crash ===
A U.S. Coast Guard MH-65C Dolphin helicopter with 4 crew members on board crashed 28 Feb 2012 into Mobile Bay, Alabama.

The helicopter was on a training mission out of U.S. Coast Guard Aviation Training Center Mobile.

=== The anti-drug mission and the budget ===
Due to Budget sequestration in 2013, the USCG's ability to interdict drug shipments to the United States has been made more difficult due to a lack of resources, and interdictions are down 30 percent, while untracked shipments have increased. United States Southern Command's traditional support for the drug mission was cut back at the same time with no USN warships assigned to the theater.

=== Icebreakers ===
By 2015, due to lack of funding allocated to the billion-dollar class of craft, the United States was operating one medium and one heavy icebreaker, down from a fleet of eight. The Coast Guard estimated it needs three heavy and three medium icebreakers to fulfil its mission. With Russia operating about 27, China preparing to launch a second, and Canada, Finland and Sweden operating more than the United States, President Obama, various lawmakers, and the FY2017 Coast Guard budget request have called for funding at least one replacement for the Polar Star (which will reach end of life by 2020).

=== U.S. Navy sailors detained by Iran ===
USCGC Monomoy, a 110-foot Island-class patrol boat, received one of the first reports of the 2016 U.S.–Iran naval incident and assisted in the eventual rescue of ten American sailors, assigned to Riverine Squadron 1, who were detained by Iranian naval forces in January 2016. A Navy second class petty officer activated a radio beacon while at gunpoint. The signal was received by Monomoy, and information was passed to the group's parent unit, Task Force 56.7, aiding the search and rescue operation where eventually the cutter escorted the sailors to safety after they were released.

=== Franklin LoBiondo Coast Guard Authorization Act of 2018 ===
In December 2018, President Donald Trump signed Senate bill S. 140, also known as the Franklin LoBiando Coast Guard Authorization Act of 2018. This legislation was proposed to approve the budget of $7.9 billion which was allocated for operating expenses for the U.S. Coast Guard. An additional $2.6 was authorized for the overall improvement of its infrastructure. It also authorized the active duty of 43,000 employees for 2018 and 44,500 personnel for the following year.

== The 2020s ==
=== Western Pacific ===
In 2020 the U.S. Coast Guard announced that it would basing a fleet of Fast Response Cutters (FRC) in Guam as a response to "destabilizing" Chinese maritime activities in the Western Pacific.

=== Operation Fouled Anchor ===
In 2020 the Coast Guard produced a report summarizing the results of Operation Fouled Anchor, a five-year investigation of dozens of substantiated sexual assault incidents that occurred between 1988 and 2006 at the Coast Guard Academy. The report was not released outside the Coast Guard, and the U.S. Congress only learned of the report in 2023. In 2024, U.S. Senate subcommittee hearings were held on the matter, and some Senators alleged that Coast Guard leadership engaged in a cover up.

=== Titan submersible implosion ===
During the Titan submersible implosion, the U.S. Coast Guard spearheaded the search and rescue efforts to find the missing submersible alongside the Canadian Coast Guard. It was also the U.S. Coast Guard which later announced on June 22 that the submersible had imploded and that they had found its debris.

=== 2023 Hawaii wildfires ===
The U.S. Coast Guard was involved in extensive efforts to rescue those affected by the 2023 Hawaii wildfires, saving 17 lives as well as locating and assisting an additional 40 other survivors. 157 Coast Guardsmen were engaged with U.S. Pacific Command and FEMA to assist with the crisis.

=== Aleutian No. 1 tow ===
In December 2023, USCGC Alex Haley towed disabled F/V Aleutian No. 1 over 160 nautical miles (300 km) to safe harbor at Adak, Alaska. Aleutian No. 1 experienced a loss of propulsion when a line became entangled in its propeller approximately 500 nautical miles (930 km) west of Dutch Harbor, Alaska and it was unable to effect repairs. Alex Haley made best speed to the drifting vessel and executed a complicated towing evolution in heavy Bering Sea winter weather and limited visibility to establish the tow to assist 8 mariners in distress.

== Future ==
The Integrated Deepwater System Program is designed to meet future threats to the U.S. from the sea. Although the program involves obtaining new ships and aircraft, Deepwater also involves upgraded information technology for command, control, communications and computers, intelligence, surveillance, and reconnaissance (C4ISR).

A key part of the Deepwater system is the Maritime Security Cutter, Large (WMSL), which is designed to replace the 378-foot (115 m) high-endurance cutters currently on duty. This ship will have a length of 421 feet (128 m), be powered by a gas turbine engine with two auxiliary diesel engines, and be capable of 12,000 nautical mile (22,000 km) voyages lasting up to 60 days. The keel laying of the USCGC Bertholf (WMSL-750), the first ship in this class, took place in September 2004. The ship was delivered in 2008. The second keel, USCGC Waesche (WMSL-751), was laid in 2005.

Another key vessel is the Maritime Security Cutter, Medium (WMSM), which will be 341 ft (104 m) long, displace 2,921 long tons (2,968 metric tons), and be capable of 45-day patrols of up to 9,000 nautical miles (17,000 km). Both the WMSL and the WMSM cutters will be able to carry two helicopters or four VTOL Unmanned Air Vehicles (VUAVs), or a combination of these.

Billions in cost overruns have plagued the Deepwater program. The GAO and agency observers have offered several opinions for this, and some have questioned whether the USCG should invest in greater number of less sophisticated vessel and air assets rather than paying dearly for cutting-edge technology.

== Coast Guard Museums ==
- Coast Guard Museum Northwest
- Virginia Beach Surf & Rescue Museum
- Coast Guard Heritage Museum
- United States Coast Guard History and Heritage Sites, a listing of dozens of historic stations, cutters, lighthouses and more

== See also ==
- Defense of the cutter Eagle, 1814 battle with British Royal Navy
- History of homeland security in the United States
- Military history of the United States
  - History of the United States Army
  - History of the United States Navy
  - History of the United States Marine Corps
  - History of the United States Air Force

== Notes ==
=== References ===
- Evans, Stephen H. (1949). The United States Coast Guard 1790–1915: A Definitive History. Naval Institute Press, Annapolis, Maryland. (no ISBN)
- Johnson, Robert Irwin (1987). Guardians of the Sea, History of the United States Coast Guard, 1915 to the Present. Naval Institute Press, Annapolis, Maryland. ISBN 978-0-87021-720-3.
- King, Irving H. (1989). The Coast Guard Under Sail: The U.S. Revenue Cutter Service, 1789–1865. Naval Institute Press, Annapolis, Maryland. ISBN 978-0-87021-234-5.
- King, Irving H. (1996). The Coast Guard Expands, 1865–1915: New Roles, New Frontiers. Naval Institute Press, Annapolis, Maryland. ISBN 978-1-55750-458-6.
- Larzelere, Alex (1997). The Coast Guard at War, Vietnam, 1965–1975. Naval Institute Press, Annapolis, Maryland. ISBN 978-1-55750-529-3.
- Larzelere, Alex (2003). The Coast Guard in World War I: An Untold Story. Naval Institute Press, Annapolis, Maryland. ISBN 978-1-55750-476-0.
- Lovell, John P. (1979). Neither Athens nor Sparta?: The American Service Academies in Transition. Indiana University Press, Bloomington, Indiana. ISBN 978-0-253-12955-0.
- Noble, Dennis L. (1990). Historical Register U.S. Revenue Cutter Service Officers, 1790–1914. Coast Guard Historian's Office, U.S. Coast Guard Headquarters, Washington, DC. (no ISBN)
- Noble, Dennis L. (1994). That Others Might Live: The U.S. Life-Saving Service, 1878–1915. Naval Institute Press, Annapolis, Maryland. ISBN 978-1-55750-627-6.
- Strobridge, Truman R. and Dennis L. Noble (1999). Alaska and the U.S. Revenue Cutter Service 1867–1915. Naval Institute Press, Annapolis, Maryland. ISBN 978-1-55750-845-4.
- Tilley, John A. "A History of Women in the Coast Guard". Notable People. U.S. Coast Guard Historian's Office.
- Walling, Michael G. (2004). Bloodstained Sea: the U.S. Coast Guard in the Battle of the Atlantic, 1941–1944. International Marine/McGraw-Hill, Camden, Maine. ISBN 978-0-07-142401-1.
- Zuckoff, Mitchell (2013). Frozen in Time. New York, New York: HarperCollins. ISBN 978-0-06-213343-4.
