= USCGC Basswood =

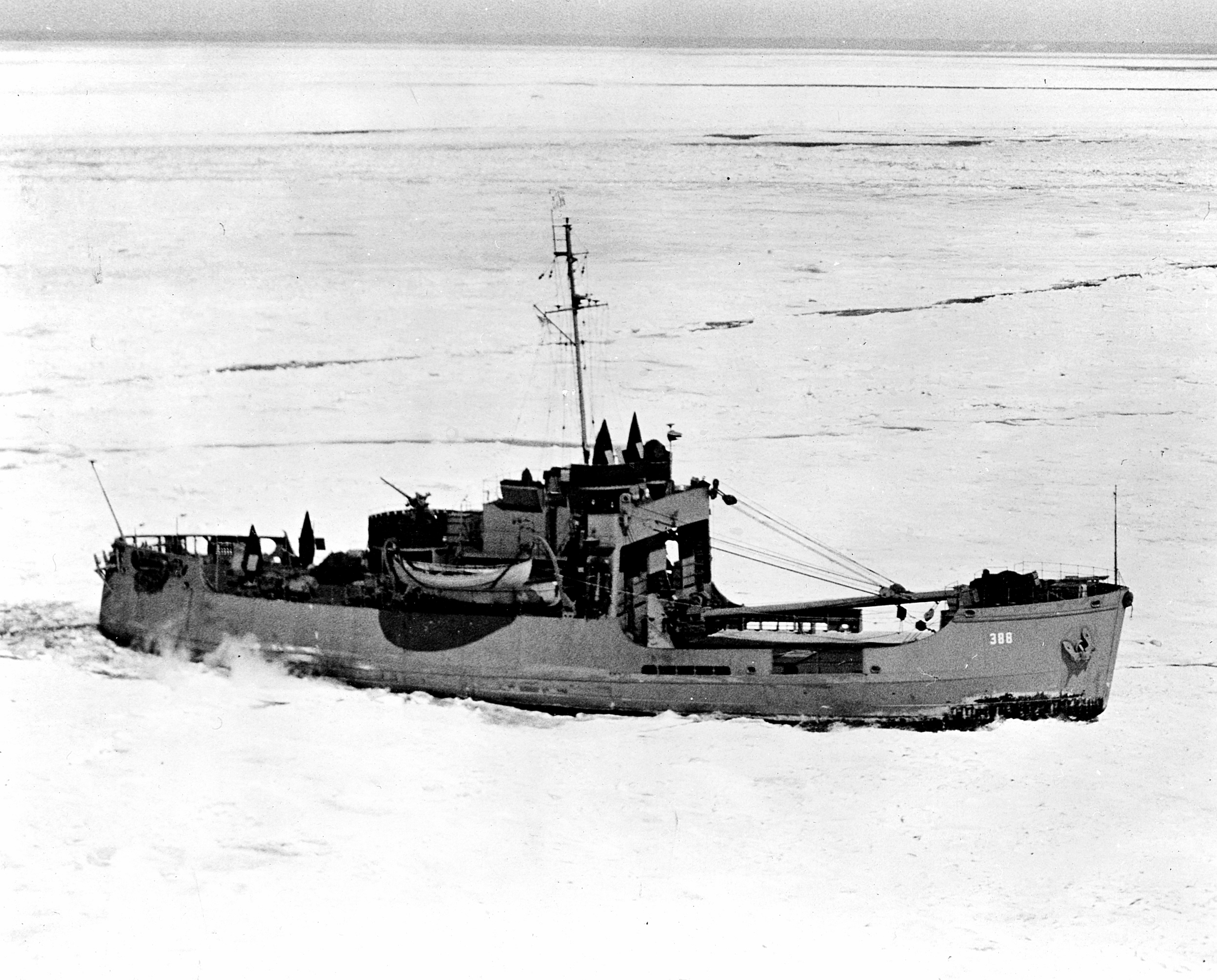
- USCGC Basswood through the Straits of Mackinac on 12 May 1944

History

United States
- Name: Basswood
- Builder: Marine and Iron Shipbuilding Corporation
- Laid down: 21 March 1943
- Launched: 20 May 1943
- Commissioned: 12 January 1944
- Decommissioned: 4 September 1998
- Fate: Sold on 24 November 2000, eventually scrapped
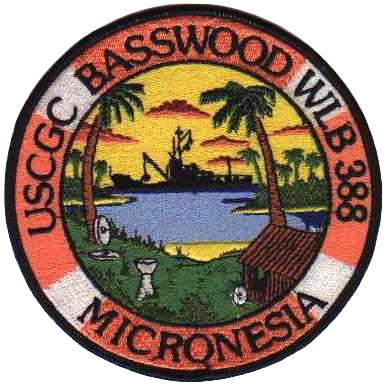
- Badge

General characteristics
- Class & type: Iris-class buoy tender
- Displacement: 935 long tons (950 t)
- Length: 180 ft (55 m)
- Beam: 47 ft 1 in (14.35 m)
- Draft: 12 ft (3.7 m)
- Propulsion: 1 × electric motor connected to 2 Westinghouse generators driven by 2 Cooper Bessemer-type GND-8, 4-cycle diesels; single screw
- Speed: 8.3 kn (15.4 km/h; 9.6 mph) cruising; 13 kn (24 km/h; 15 mph) maximum
- Complement: 8 officers; 72 enlisted
- Armament: 1 × 3 inch gun; 2 × 20 mm/80; 2 × depth charge tracks; 2 × Mousetraps; 4 × Y-guns

USCGC Basswood (WLB-388) was an Iris-class buoy tender belonging to the United States Coast Guard launched on 20 May 1943, and commissioned on 12 January 1944.

== Design ==
The Iris-class buoy tenders were constructed after the Mesquite-class buoy tenders. Basswood cost $896,402 to construct and had an overall length of 180 feet (55 m). She had a beam of 37 feet (11 m) and a draft of up to 12 feet (3.7 m) at the time of construction, although this was increased to 14 feet 7 inches (4.45 m) in 1966. She initially had a displacement of 935 long tons (950 t; 1,047 short tons); this was increased to 1,026 long tons (1,042 t; 1,149 short tons) in 1966. She was powered by one electric motor. This was connected up to two Westinghouse generators which were driven by two Cooper-Bessemer GND-8 four-cycle diesel engines. She had a single screw.

The Iris-class buoy tenders had maximum sustained speeds of 13 knots (24 km/h; 15 mph), although this diminished to around 11.9 knots (22.0 km/h; 13.7 mph) in 1966. For economic and effective operation, they had to initially operate at 8.3 knots (15.4 km/h; 9.6 mph), although this increased to 8.5 knots (15.7 km/h; 9.8 mph) in 1966. The ship had a complement of six officers and seventy-four crew members in 1945; this decreased to two warrants, four officers, and forty-seven men in 1966. They were fitted with a SL1 radar system and QBE-3A sonar system in 1945. Their armament consisted of one 3"/50 caliber gun, two 20 mm/80 guns, two Mousetraps, two depth charge tracks, and four Y-guns in 1945; these were removed in 1966.

== Operational history ==
International radio call sign of USCGC Basswood (WLB-388)
| November | Oscar | Delta | Golf |

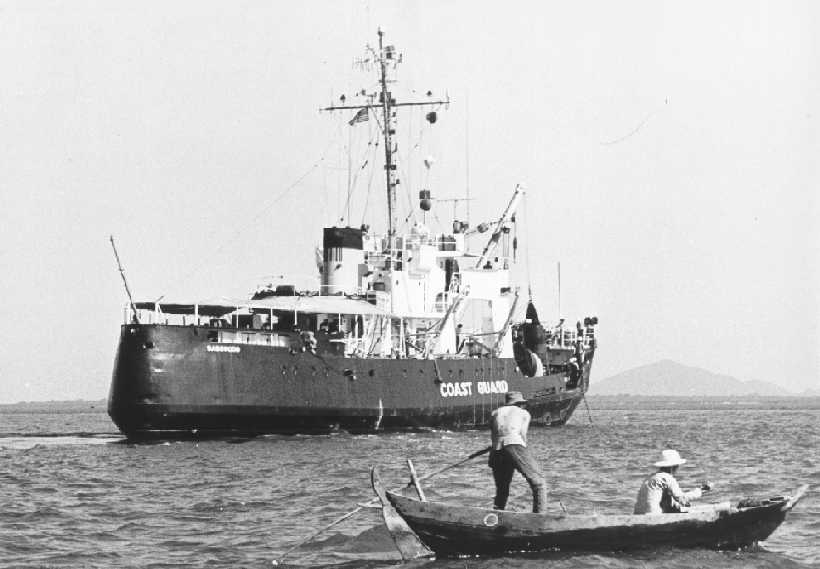
USCGC Basswood works a buoy in Vũng Tàu harbor, 1967

Basswood was laid down in Duluth, Minnesota, and commissioned in January 1944. From March to April 1944, she performed general ATON and icebreaking on the Great Lakes after which she was transferred to Astoria, Oregon, for additional ATON duty until the end of World War II.

In the 1950s Basswood made several trips to the Marshall Islands in support of US nuclear weapons testing there, specifically for Operations Greenhouse (1951), Castle (1954), and Redwing (1956). Forty-three nuclear weapons tests occurred at Enewetak Atoll in the Marshalls from 1948 to 1958.

She returned to the Marshalls in 1966, carrying Dayle Husted of the Smithsonian Institution to Enewetak as part of the Pacific Ocean Biological Survey Program. (Note: The Pacific Ocean Biological Survey Program a.k.a. the Pacific Project was part of a secret biological weapons research program funded by the Army (see also Deseret Test Center, Project 112, and Project SHAD).) Basswood spent two days anchored in the lagoon there while Husted conducted his survey. (Note: Husted's original handwritten field notes from the trip can be viewed on the Biodiversity Heritage Library website)

Basswood completed three deployments to Vietnam during the Vietnam War. Consequently, personnel who served aboard her during one of these deployments are "eligible for the presumption of Agent Orange herbicide exposure" by the Department of Veterans Affairs.

From 1968 until her decommissioning in 1998, Basswood was stationed in Guam, and holds the distinction of being commissioned longer than any other naval ship assigned there. While based in Guam, she was the driving force behind Project Handclasp, a US Navy program to provide health care and humanitarian relief to outlying islands in the Pacific Ocean.

In 1976, the eye of Typhoon Pamela passed over Guam causing widespread, major damage. In Apra Harbor, Basswood's home port, ten ships or tugs were sunk or forced aground, as were numerous smaller vessels. However, Basswood successfully rode out the storm at anchor, recording a peak wind gust of 120 knots/hour (138 mph) and a minimum barometric pressure of 933.1 mb (27.6 inHg).

On 1 July 1997, Basswood began pursuit of the fishing vessel Cao Yu No. 6025. The Cao Yu was sighted by a Canadian Air Force P-3 crew on 26 June about 1,500 miles northwest of Midway Island apparently engaged in illegal driftnet fishing. US Coast Guard and Navy aircraft surveilled the ship before it was intercepted by Basswood, which followed the fishing vessel for some 1,500 miles. Contrary to the master's claims, the People's Republic of China denied that the vessel was registered there and, therefore, the Coast Guard determined that it was flagless and subject to boarding. The Cao Yu "aggressively" resisted but crew from Basswood and the USCGC Chase nevertheless boarded the Cao Yu on 10 July near the Japanese island of Kyushu and seized a 120-ton catch of mostly albacore tuna along with illegal driftnets. The Cao Yu's crew was taken aboard the Chase and transported to Guam. Basswood towed the Cao Yu to Guam where it was sold at auction, the ship's master was prosecuted for resisting the Coast Guard boarding.

== Awards and decorations ==
The Basswood was awarded the Coast Guard Unit Commendation with the Operational Distinguishing Device three times. (Note: The award periods were 12 Aug. 1974 – 29 Jan. 1975; 1 Jul. – 31 Dec. 1986; and, 1 Jun. 1997 – 31 May 1999.) She earned the Meritorious Unit Commendation with the Operational Distinguishing Device four times. (Note: The award periods were 20 – 31 May 1976; 13 – 16 Nov. 1977; 13 – 17 Dec. 1985; and, 10 May 1988 – 10 May 1990.) She was awarded six Coast Guard "E" Ribbons for her performance during Refresher Training with U.S. Navy Fleet Training Group (FTG) Pearl Harbor (1984, 1993, & 1995) and FTG West Pac (Subic) in 1986, 1988, and 1990. She also earned the Vietnam Service Medal three times and the Republic of Vietnam Campaign Medal for deployments in 1967, 1971, and 1972. Other distinctions received include the Bicentennial Unit Commendation, American Campaign Medal, World War II Victory Medal, National Defense Service Medal (3 awards), and Humanitarian Service Medal (2 awards).

== See also ==
- List of United States Coast Guard cutters
