= USS LST-327 =

World War II landing ship

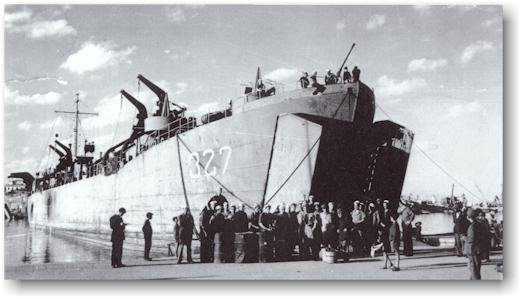
- USS LST-327 beached at Palermo, Sicily, 1943

History

United States
- Name: USS LST-327
- Builder: Philadelphia Naval Shipyard
- Laid down: 12 November 1942
- Launched: 11 February 1943
- Commissioned: 5 March 1943
- Decommissioned: 19 November 1945
- Stricken: 5 December 1945
- Fate: Sold for scrapping, 15 September 1948

General characteristics
- Class & type: LST-1-class tank landing ship
- Displacement: 1,625 long tons (1,651 t) light; 4,080 long tons (4,145 t) full
- Length: 328 ft (100 m)
- Beam: 50 ft (15 m)
- Propulsion: 2 × General Motors 12-567 diesel engines, two shafts, twin rudders
- Speed: 11.6 knots (21.5 km/h; 13.3 mph)
- Boats & landing craft carried: 6 × LCVPs
- Troops: 14 officers, 131 enlisted men
- Complement: 9 officers, 120 enlisted men
- Armament: 2 × twin 40 mm gun mounts (Mark 51 director); 4 × single 40 mm gun mounts; 12 × single 20 mm gun mounts

Service record
- Operations: World War II; Operation Avalanche; Operation Husky; Operation Overlord; Operation Shingle; Tunisian campaign
- Awards: 5 battle stars

USS LST-327 was an LST-1-class tank landing ship of the United States Navy during World War II.

== Construction ==
LST-327 was laid down on 12 November 1942 at Philadelphia Naval Shipyard, Philadelphia, Pennsylvania. Launched on 11 February 1943 and commissioned on 5 March 1943.

== Service history ==
During World War II, LST-327 was assigned to the European-African-Middle East Theater. The ship took part in the Tunisian operations (July 1943), the Sicilian occupation (July 1943), the Salerno landings (September 1943), the Anzio-Nettuno landings (January to March 1944), and the Invasion of Normandy (June 1944).

On 27 August 1944, while travelling along the English Channel, the USS LST-327 collided with an enemy mine, leading to heavy damage and the death of 22 crewmen. The ship was then brought to Plymouth, England, to receive repairs. Once the damage mended, USS LST-327 departed Plymouth and made way for the United States. In the months following its return, the ship was decommissioned and struck from the Naval Register.

On 15 September 1948, the ship was sold for scrapping to Sun Shipbuilding & Drydock Co., located in Chester, Pennsylvania.
