= Coast Guard Mobilization Plan 1 =

In the early 20th century, Coast Guard Mobilization Plan 1 and Coast Guard Mobilization Plan 2 were contingency plans of the United States Department of the Treasury for the operational transfer of the United States Coast Guard to the United States Department of the Navy in the event of a major crisis. Plan 1 was designed for activation in the event of a war, while Plan 2 was designed for activation in the event of a peacetime exigency.

The groundwork for Plan 1 and Plan 2 was jointly formulated by the Navy and the Coast Guard beginning in 1915, following the merger of the Revenue Cutter Service with the United States Life-Saving Service. These preparations were formalized with the classified document Mobilization of the Coast Guard when Required to Operate as a Part of the Navy, containing the procedures by which the combining of the two maritime services into a unified naval force would be accomplished. The plan was finalized in March 1917.

While the mobilization plans generally envisaged the transfer of the whole of the Coast Guard to the Navy, some exceptions were prescribed. The United States Coast Guard Academy, for instance, would not be transferred to Navy control, nor would Coast Guard stations 276 and 305 (lifesaving stations located in Kentucky and Alaska, respectively).

Mobilization Plan 1 was activated on April 6, 1917 – following the United States declaration of war against Germany – when the United States Navy communications center in Arlington, Virginia transmitted the activation phrase "Plan One, Acknowledge" to Coast Guard headquarters. It, in turn, relayed it to Coast Guard forces via encrypted radiogram. Over the next several hours, 330 Coast Guard cutters and shore facilities placed themselves under the command of their local naval districts.
