= John A. Henriques =

United States Revenue Cutter Service officer

Captain, USRCS John Ashcroft Henriques
- Born: 1826; State of New York, U.S. (Note: The state of New York is the only place given for Henriques' birthplace in the references used in this article.)
- Died: 1906 (aged 79–80); Waterford, Connecticut
- Burial place: Cedar Grove Cemetery, New London, Connecticut, U.S.
- Military career
- Branch: United States Revenue Cutter Service
- Service years: 1863–1902
- Rank: Captain, USRCS
- Commands: USRC John Sherman; USRC Reliance; USRC Wayanda; USRC Lincoln; USRC Hugh McCulloch; USRC Salmon P. Chase; USRC Richard Rush; USRC Louis McLane; USRC Commodore Perry; USRC Levi Woodbury

John A. Henriques (1826–1906) was a United States Revenue Cutter Service officer who was noted for helping form the establishment of the Revenue Cutter Service School of Instruction, which later became the United States Coast Guard Academy. (Note: The U.S. Revenue Cutter Service was officially known as the U.S. Revenue–Marine until 1894 but was sometimes unofficially referred to as the Revenue Cutter Service before 1894.)

== Early life ==
Henriques started a career in carpentry in the 1840s and after finishing an apprenticeship in carpentry he began working on coastal vessels to earn a living. By 1850 he was a journeyman carpenter but he abandoned carpentry to become a merchant seaman, eventually working his way up the crew ranks to first mate. After the beginning of the Civil War he petitioned for a commission with the Revenue Cutter Service at age 37. He was commissioned a third lieutenant on March 27, 1863, and was assigned to James C. Dobbin.

== U.S. Revenue Cutter Service ==
=== Early service ===
During subsequent assignments aboard cutters Crawford, Northerner and John Sherman, Henriques was promoted to first lieutenant, July 11, 1864, skipping the normal promotion to second lieutenant. His promotion to captain came less than two years later on June 6, 1866. On August 10, 1868, Henriques set sail from Baltimore, Maryland as captain of the newly commissioned cutter Reliance bound for San Francisco, California. The passage around Cape Horn included eight days of gale-force winds at the cape with arrival in San Francisco on January 29, 1868. With Henriques as captain, Reliance was transferred to Sitka, Alaska on August 29, 1868, arriving on November 28. Henriques became one of the first cutter captains to sail in Alaskan waters and the first captain to enforce U.S. laws in Alaska waters. After Henriques was transferred from Reliance he was the commanding officer of Wayanda and four months later he was transferred to Lincoln as her commanding officer. In 1874, Henriques was chosen to ferry the newly built cutter Richard Rush around Cape Horn to San Francisco arriving in 1875. While commanding Rush on an Alaska patrol he received orders to report to Washington, DC for special duty to form a new Revenue–Marine school of instruction for cadets entering the service as new officers.

=== Establishment of Revenue School of Instruction ===
At the urging of several senior officers, Sumner Kimball, the chief of the Revenue–Marine Division, took steps to establish a school to train officers for eventual assignment to cutters in the fleet. Henriques, along with Captain George W. Moore and Captain James H. Merryman suggested that there should be uniform training for new officers rather having them report to a cutter untrained. Congress passed legislation to provide for an officer's training school on July 31, 1876 Henriques, Moore, and Merryman all thought that sail training was very important to teach beginning officers so they persuaded Kimball to authorize the use of the cutter James C. Dobbin homeported at New Bedford, Massachusetts as a school ship for training new cadets at sea. During the months from October through May the cadets studied a curriculum of mathematics, law, English, French, history, seamanship and navigation while the summer months were spent aboard Dobbin at sea along the Atlantic coast. The initial course of instruction was for two years and the graduates were transferred as newly commissioned third lieutenants to cutters in the Revenue–Marine fleet. Eventually the course work included three years of instruction and the school was known as the Revenue Cutter Service School of Instruction. In 1878 the newly constructed cutter Salmon P. Chase replaced Dobbin as the school ship. Henriques served as superintendent of the School of Instruction and captain of Chase until June 15, 1883 when he was replaced by Captain Leonard G. Shepard. The Revenue Service School of Instruction eventually became the Revenue Service Academy in 1914 and when the U.S. Revenue Cutter Service was merged with the United States Life–Saving Service on January 28, 1915, it was then known as the United States Coast Guard Academy.

=== Later service ===
After his service at the School of Instruction ended in 1883, Henriques served on several examining boards for prospective cadets and superintended the construction of the cutter Commodore Perry. He served as commanding officer of the cutters USRC Louis McLane, Commodore Perry, and Levi Woodbury. He served as an inspector for the U.S. Life–Saving Service before retiring in 1902.

== Retirement ==
In retirement Henriques moved to Waterford, Connecticut where he died at the age of 79 on March 29, 1906. Henriques was survived by his wife, Ellen Stoddard Henriques and his son, John Philip Henriques. He was buried at Cedar Grove Cemetery, New London, Connecticut.
