= Worth G. Ross =

U.S. Revenue Cutter Service officer (1854-1916)

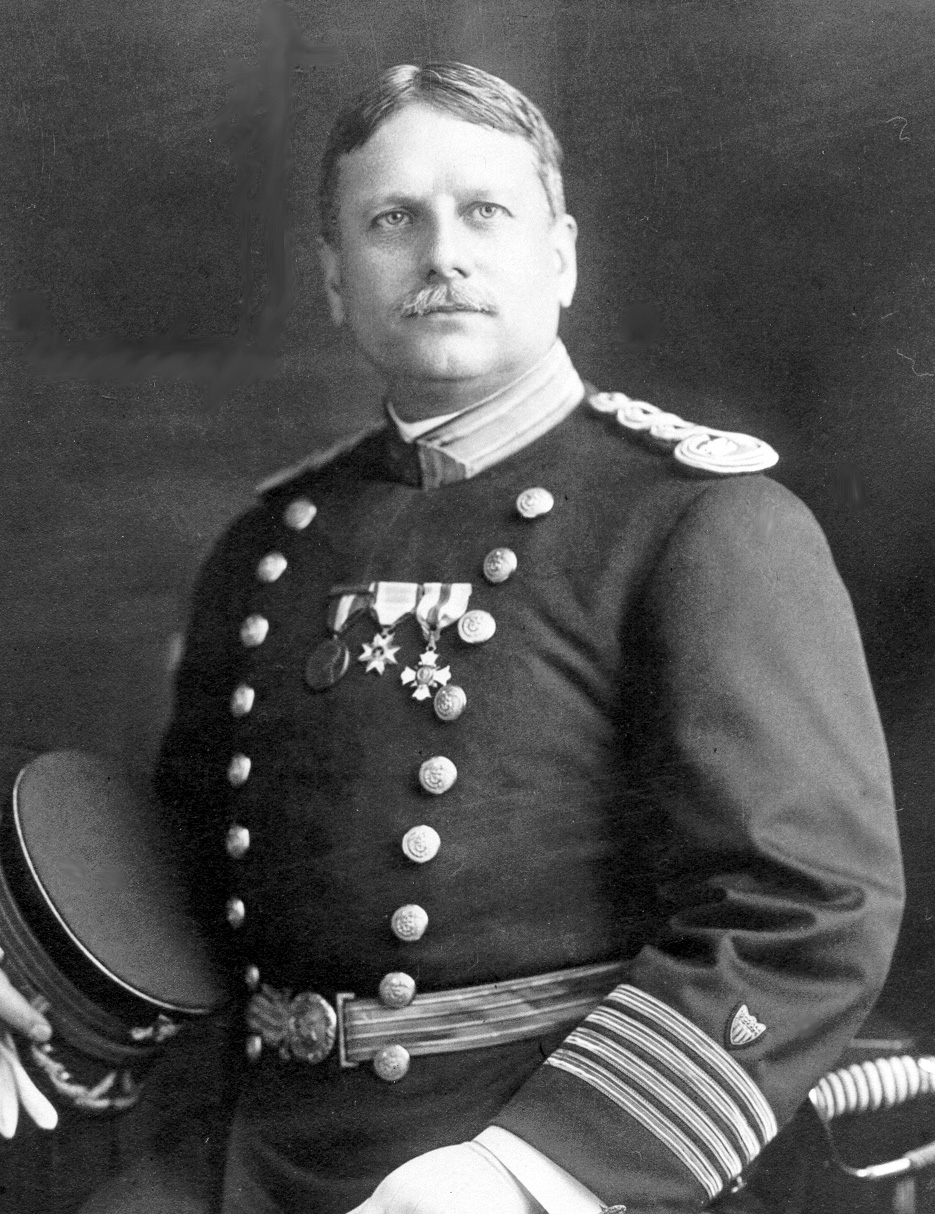
- Born: 19 April 1854
- Died: 24 March 1916 (aged 61) New Bedford, Massachusetts, U.S.
- Allegiance: United States
- Branch: U.S. Revenue Cutter Service
- Service years: 1877–1911
- Rank: Captain-Commandant (Note: The rank Captain-Commandant was both a title and a rank in the Revenue Cutter Service and was authorized by Congress in 1908. Captain-Commandant was equivalent to a U.S. Navy captain. The next lower RCS rank was senior captain which was equivalent to a Navy commander. RCS captains were equivalent to Navy lieutenant commanders.)
- Commands: Captain-Commandant of the Revenue Cutter Service
- Conflicts: Spanish–American War; Battle of Santiago de Cuba

Worth G. Ross (19 April 1854 – 24 March 1916) is known as the third Commandant of the Coast Guard, although he was never formally appointed to that position. Joining the United States Revenue Cutter Service (known today as the United States Coast Guard) in 1877, he graduated from the Revenue Cutter Service School of Instruction's first class in 1879. He held a variety of appointments during the late 19th century before being appointed Captain-Commandant of the service in 1905. In this capacity he commanded a number of cutters on the United States Gulf Coast and was responsible for moving the School of Instruction to Fort Trumbull, Connecticut.

He was the son of Brigadier General Samuel Ross (1822–1880), who commanded the 20th Connecticut Infantry during the American Civil War.

== Early life and education ==
A native of Cleveland, Ohio, Ross was appointed as a cadet to the Revenue Cutter Service School of Instruction on 4 January 1877 after successfully completing an entrance examination. He was among ten candidates out of nineteen to pass the required examination and was one of eight cadets that were told to report aboard the USRC Dobbin at Baltimore, Maryland.

Dobbin left on a summer training cruise on 24 May and Ross was detached from the cutter awaiting orders on 13 July because of a rules infraction. A week later, Ross was reprimanded for "licentious and scandalous conduct" by Captain John Henriques, head of the school. Records do not specify what his offense was, although Ross apparently arrived in New Bedford, Massachusetts, on 15 October with the rest of the class to start cadet academic training. The training cutter Dobbin was replaced by the newly commissioned USRC Salmon P. Chase during August 1878 and Ross along with the rest of the cadet class were the first cadet class to serve aboard Chase.

After the first year, he received the most demerits in his class and came very close to being expelled. The school conducted a two-year course at the time and Ross graduated on 2 July 1879, after which he was commissioned as a third lieutenant. He remained assigned to Chase until being reassigned to USRC Colfax on 29 May 1882.

== Early career ==
His promotion to third lieutenant was made permanent on 28 January 1880. On 29 May 1882 Ross was assigned to Colfax, homeported at Wilmington, North Carolina. He was promoted to second lieutenant on 20 October 1884. On 28 February 1885 he departed Colfax on leave while awaiting his next assignment. On 2 June 1885, Ross reported aboard USRC George M. Bibb at Oswego, New York, and was assigned to her until she was decommissioned for the winter season. He departed Bibb on 4 December 1885. Ross was briefly assigned to Bibb again during the period of 15 May to 30 July 1886. After he was promoted to first lieutenant on 18 January 1896, he served on the USRC Grant, which was then serving on the Bering Sea Patrol. (Note: References used in this biography do not account for the RCS career of Ross from the time he left USRC Bibb until he reported aboard USRC Grant, a span of ten years.)

Ross was serving as executive officer aboard the USRC Levi Woodbury when the Spanish–American War was declared in April 1898, but he was soon transferred to the USS Harvard, a converted passenger liner, formerly known as City of New York, that the U.S. Navy used as a supply carrier and troopship. Harvard arrived at Santiago de Cuba and rescued over 600 survivors of the Battle of Santiago de Cuba on 3 July 1898. As a crewmember, Ross received a bronze medal from Congress for his actions that day.

On 3 June 1902, Ross was promoted to captain. He was also the plank-owning captain of the USRC Mohawk, a 205-foot (62 m) steel-hulled "First Class Cruising Cutter," that was commissioned at Arundel Cove, Maryland, on 10 May 1904.

== Captain-Commandant ==
On 25 April 1905, Ross was appointed as the Captain-Commandant of the Revenue Cutter Service by Secretary of the Treasury, L. M. Shaw. (Note: King states that Ross was promoted effective 1 April 1905.) He became the first School of Instruction graduate to become the Captain-Commandant of the Revenue Cutter Service. Soon after his appointment, Ross was directed by Secretary Shaw to take personal charge of six Revenue Service cutters that were being used to quarantine vessels arriving at the ports along the Gulf Coast from the threat of a yellow fever epidemic and defuse tensions caused by the disruption of shipping schedules. Ross established a temporary headquarters at Gulfport, Mississippi, and established patrols for the six cutters and seven chartered vessels under his command, and remained on-scene until 23 October when the crisis had passed.

Despite his School of Instruction experience, Ross later used his position as commandant to procure funding for a permanent home for the Revenue Cutter Service School of Instruction. After USRC Salmon P. Chase was decommissioned, Ross moved the school to Curtis Bay, Maryland, and, in 1910, after the facilities there proved to be too small, to Fort Trumbull, Connecticut, a surplus United States Army fort located one mile (1.6 km) away from the academy's current home in New London, Connecticut, to which the academy was moved in 1932.

Ross retired from active service at his own request because of ill health on 30 April 1911 and was succeeded as commandant by Senior Captain Ellsworth P. Bertholf. He died at his home in New Bedford, Massachusetts, on 24 March 1916. He is buried in Rural Cemetery in New Bedford, Massachusetts.

== Memberships ==
Captain Ross was a hereditary companion of the Michigan Commandery of the Military Order of the Loyal Legion of the United States and also a veteran companion of the Naval and Military Order of the Spanish War.

== Notes ==
Footnotes

Citations

References cited

- "Worth G. Ross, 1905–1911" (asp). Commandants of the U.S. Coast Guard. U.S. Coast Guard Historian's Office.
- "Harvard". Dictionary of American Naval Fighting Ships (DANFS). Naval History and Heritage Command, U.S. Navy.
- "Mohawk, 1904" (PDF). Cutters, Craft & U.S. Coast Guard-Manned Army & Navy Vessels. U.S. Coast Guard Historian's Office.
- "Record of Movements, Vessels of the United States Coast Guard, 1790–December 31, 1933 (1989 reprint)" (PDF). U.S. Coast Guard, Department of Transportation.
- Johnson, Robert Irwin (1987). Guardians of the Sea, History of the United States Coast Guard, 1915 to the Present. Naval Institute Press, Annapolis, Maryland. ISBN 978-0-87021-720-3.
- King, Irving H. (1996). The Coast Guard Expands, 1865–1915: New Roles, New Frontiers. Naval Institute Press, Annapolis, Maryland. ISBN 978-1-55750-458-6.
- Kroll, C. Douglas (2002). Commodore Ellsworth P. Bertholf: First Commandant of the Coast Guard. Naval Institute Press, Annapolis, Maryland. ISBN 978-1-55750-474-6.
- Noble, Dennis L. "Historical Register U.S. Revenue Cutter Service Officers, 1790–1914" (PDF). Coast Guard Personnel. U.S. Coast Guard Historian's Office.
- Strobridge, Truman R. and Dennis L. Noble (1999). Alaska and the U.S. Revenue Cutter Service, 1867–1915. Naval Institute Press, Annapolis, Maryland. ISBN 978-1-55750-845-4.

Military offices
Preceded by Charles F. Shoemaker	Commandant of the Coast Guard; 1905–1911	Succeeded by Ellsworth P. Bertholf
