= USRC Commodore Perry =

USRC Commodore Perry may refer to the following United States Revenue Cutter Service ships that are named for Oliver Hazard Perry:

- USRC Commodore Perry (1865), a revenue cutter in service from 1865 through 1883.
- USRC Commodore Perry (1884), a revenue cutter in service from 1884 through 1910.

See also

- USS Perry
