= Charles F. Shoemaker =

Charles Frederick Shoemaker
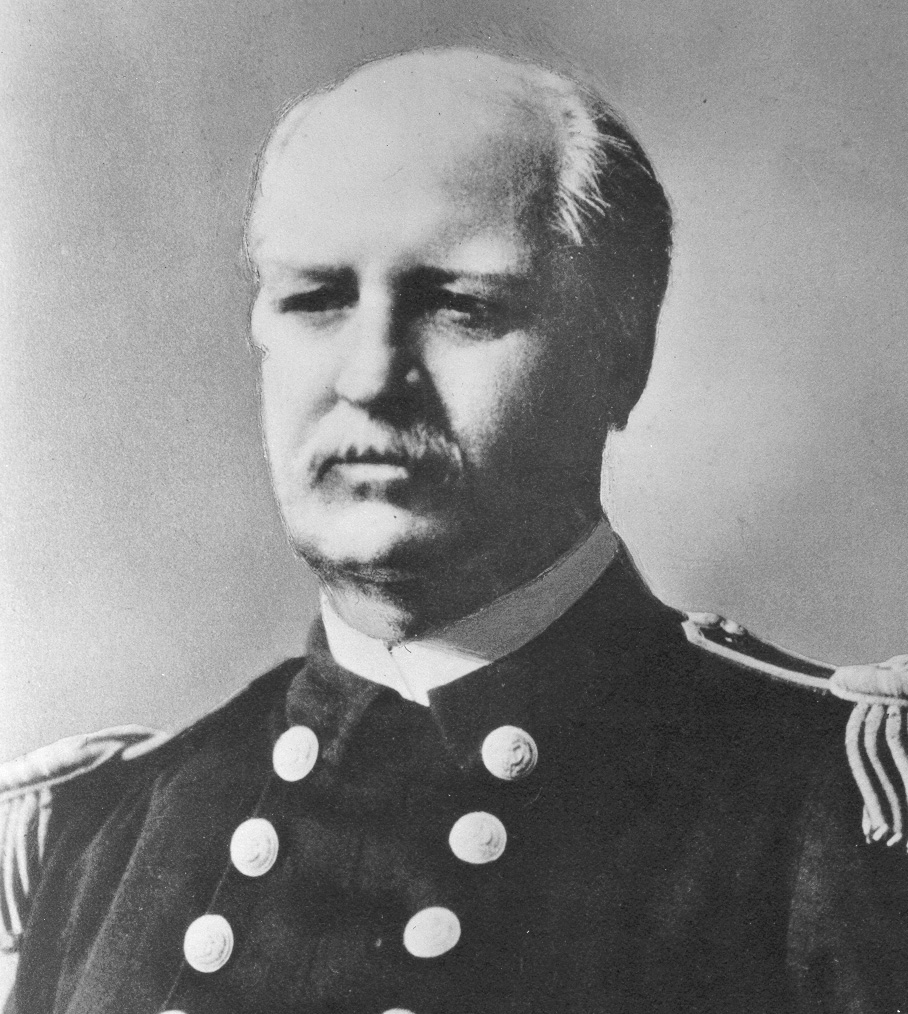
- Senior Captain Charles F. Shoemaker, USRCS
- Born: 27 March 1841; Glendale, Iowa Territory, U.S.
- Died: 11 July 1913 (aged 72); Woodstock, Virginia, U.S.
- Spouse: Rhetta Miller Shoemaker
- Military career
- Allegiance: United States
- Branch: U.S. Revenue Cutter Service
- Service years: 1860–1864, 1868–1905
- Rank: Senior captain (Note: The RCS rank of senior captain was equivalent to a naval commander. RCS captains were equivalent to naval lieutenant commanders.)
- Commands: Chief of the U.S. Revenue Cutter Service

Charles Frederick Shoemaker (27 March 1841 – 11 July 1913) was a captain in the United States Revenue Cutter Service and was appointed in 1895 by Secretary of the Treasury John G. Carlisle to be Chief of the Revenue Marine Division of the Department of the Treasury.

Shoemaker was noted for his leadership in gaining improvements in the retirement system for officers in the Revenue Cutter Service and for leading the service at a time when there were many engineering improvements made in the construction of vessels used by the service. During his tenure he worked successfully with three different Secretaries of the Treasury as an appointee to improve the personnel standards and the vessels used by the service.

Although he was never formally known as Commandant, he is recognized today as the second Commandant of the Coast Guard.

== Early life and education ==
Shoemaker was born in Iowa Territory on 27 March 1841. His father, William R. Shoemaker, was an officer in the ordnance department of the U.S. Army and moved the family from one post to another many times during his army career. As a child, Charles Shoemaker was educated at home by members of his family and became adept at mathematics. At 17, Shoemaker received an appointment to the U.S. Naval Academy from Miguel Otero, the congressional delegate from New Mexico Territory. After three years, he resigned from the academy and was commissioned as a third lieutenant in the Revenue Cutter Service on 20 November 1860.

== Career ==
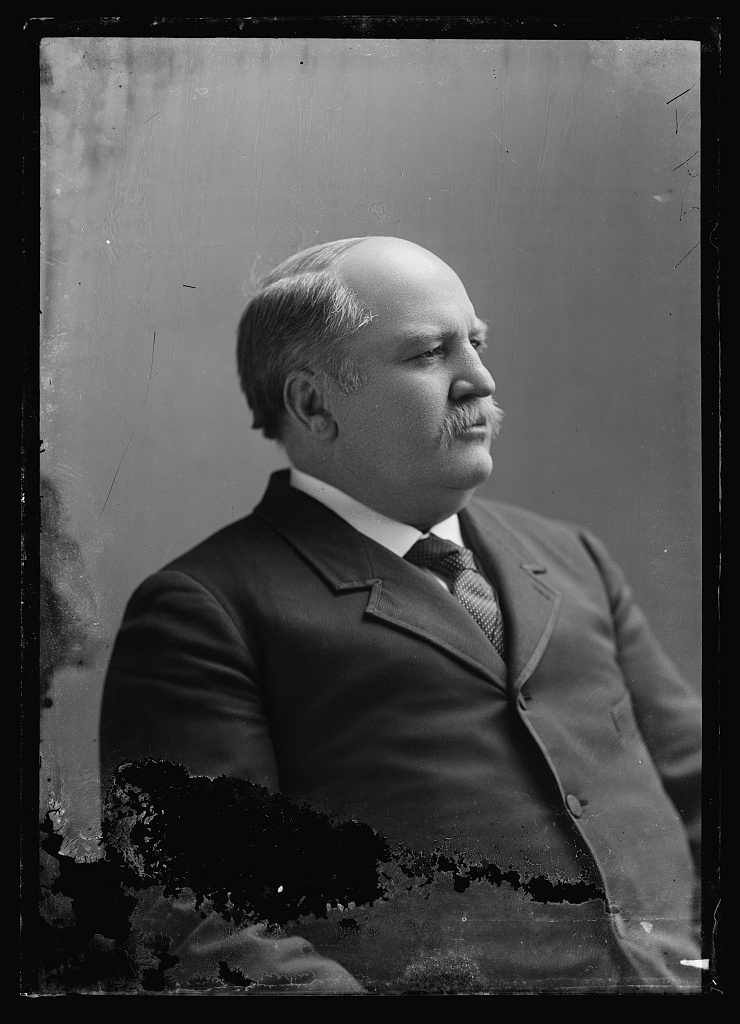
Shoemaker later in life

His first assignment was aboard the USRC Lewis Cass stationed at Mobile, Alabama. In the days leading up to the Civil War, his commanding officer, Captain James J. Morrison, resigned his commission, turned the cutter over to Alabama state authorities, and left Shoemaker to lead his officers and men back to Union territory. He served on several revenue cutters guarding the Port of New York until 4 April 1864, when he resigned his commission to go into private business.

Shoemaker was re-commissioned a third lieutenant on 25 June 1868 and promoted to a second lieutenant on 12 March 1872 serving at various stations on the Atlantic coast. In 1875, he was serving on USRC Active, homeported at New Bedford, Massachusetts until he was assigned the duties of assistant inspector of the U.S. Life-Saving Service New York City. (Note: Sumner I. Kimball, the civilian head of both the Revenue Cutter Service and the Life-Saving Service, directed in USLSS regulations that RCS officers be detailed to inspect the facilities and local civilian crews of each life-saving station at least once a year to insure that equipment was in good repair and that the crews were properly trained.) In 1876 he was appointed assistant inspector of the Third Life Saving District of the U.S. Life-Saving Service and while serving in that billet was promoted to first lieutenant on 25 March 1878.

In 1878, Shoemaker was transferred to the office of Sumner I. Kimball, then the Chief of the Revenue Marine Bureau and was assigned investigating duties and heard complaints against keepers at all Life-Saving Service stations. In 1880, he was assigned to investigate the sinking of the British barque M & S Henderson near the Pea Island Life-Saving Station. After taking statements from the station crew and survivors of the shipwreck, Shoemaker concluded that the surfman on watch had been negligent as a lookout and that the station's keeper had lied under oath. Both were dismissed and Shoemaker appointed Richard Etheridge, a black surfman as the new keeper. Etheridge was the first black keeper of a life saving station and was permitted to have an all black crew on the recommendation of Shoemaker; a situation that lasted until 1947 when the station was disestablished.

Shoemaker was assigned as executive officer on the USRC Seward in 1882 which at the time patrolled the Gulf Coast and was homeported at Bay Saint Louis, Mississippi. In 1885 he was once again detailed to the USLSS, first as an assistant inspector of the Third District and later as inspector of all districts except the Twelfth district on the Pacific coast. During this assignment, he located and obtained sites for stations, conducted 300 investigations, and brought serious charges against four assistant superintendents of the service. In April 1891 he was assigned as the commanding officer of USRC Peter G. Washington at the Port of New York. After shifting Washington to Philadelphia in 1893, he assumed command of the newly commissioned USRC Hudson in Philadelphia and returned to New York for harbor patrol duty.

=== Chief of Revenue Cutter Service ===
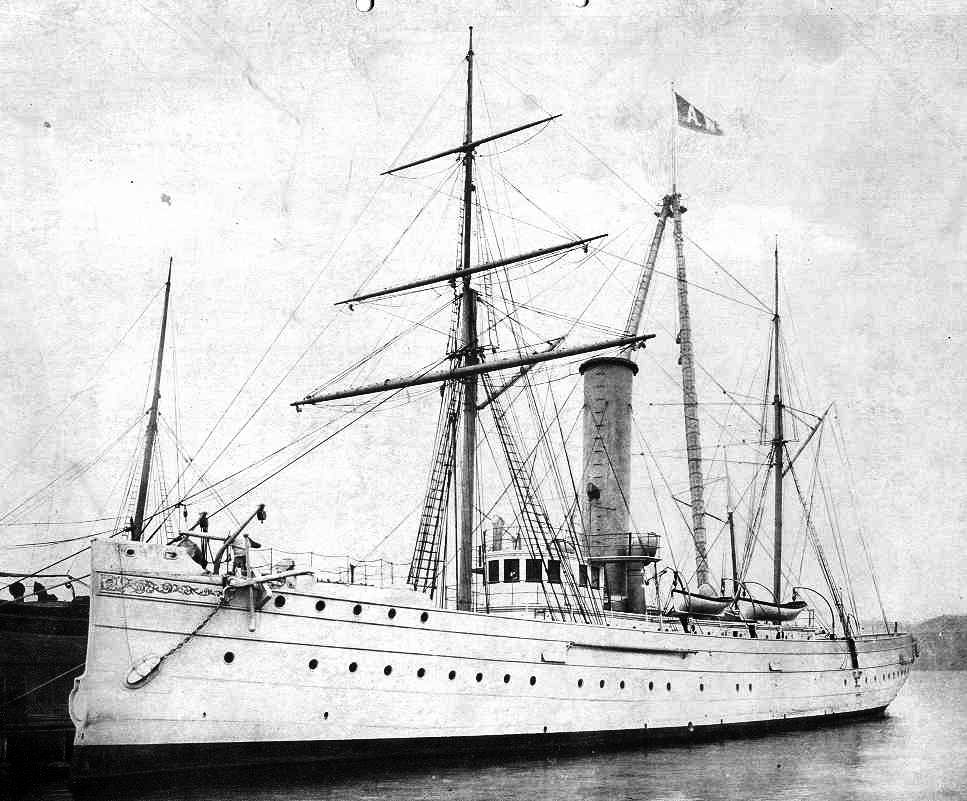
USRC Manning, one of several cutters built during Shoemaker's tenure as Commandant.

On 19 March 1895, Secretary of the Treasury, John Griffin Carlisle appointed Shoemaker to replace Leonard G. Shepard as Chief of the Revenue Cutter Division and promoted him to senior captain.

==== Improvements in service retirement ====
As a result of Secretary Carlisle's and predecessor Shepard's efforts, legislation passed during March 1895 allowed Shoemaker to place 39 disabled officers that had been on active duty since the Civil War on a retired list, thus giving younger officers a chance at promotion. Since retirement practices of the period were non-existent, so many long serving officers were kept on active duty status well beyond their ability to actually serve effectively because of age and health related issues. Because the number of officers in the RCS was limited by Congressional legislation, this caused senior officers to serve in multiple billets and junior officers oftentimes had to serve in billets that required a senior officer, but they couldn't be promoted or paid the senior officer's pay. (Note: The entire Revenue Cutter Service consisted of 222 officers and 1000 men during 1895.) The legislation of March 1895 allowed the Chief of the Revenue Cutter Division to take steps to retire the disabled officers at half pay; in turn opening the ranks to younger qualified officers. This helped officer morale of the Revenue Cutter Service. Unfortunately it only affected those officers that were on active duty and incapacitated at the time the legislation was enacted so it was not a permanent solution. Both Shoemaker and Carlisle continued to push for retirement reforms for officer corps, asking Congress to approve retirement at three-quarters pay any officer that had reached the age of 64 or had served for thirty years and declared physically or mentally disqualified for duty by a medical officer. Lyman Gage, who succeeded Carlisle as Secretary of the Treasury, called for enlisted men injured in the line of duty to be included on a pension list; Shoemaker endorsed this reform also. Congress didn't take action on legislation allowing this to occur until the Overland Relief Expedition of 1897–1898 and the Spanish–American War brought public attention to the Revenue Cutter Service. By 1901, the service faced a shortage of qualified officers once more because of the temporary nature of the 1895 retirement law; the officer ranks were again filled with the aged and infirm and lieutenants had to fill billets that would have normally been reserved for a captain. Finally, at the urging of both Gage and Shoemaker, Congress passed Senate Bill 1025 on 12 April 1902 that recognized the discrepancies in the treatment of Revenue Cutter Service officers versus officers in the other services:

"Officers of the Navy rank with officers of the Army. Officers of the Cutter Service should by right and fairness rank with both. They have earned, by faithful service, devotion to duty, and heroic effort in peace and in war, this right and not to confer it would be an unjust discrimination against a valiant and devoted body of men who bear the commissions of the President, by and with the advice and consent of the Senate, upon the same terms as do officers of the kindred services."

By 30 June 1902, the service had retired, under the new law, nine captains, and five chief engineers because of age and one chief engineer, one third lieutenant and two assistant engineers because of disability; thus opening up opportunities for promotion for the lower ranks.

==== New cutter construction ====
Building on the foundation laid by Shepard, Shoemaker oversaw the acquisition of new steel-hulled cutters and increased the number of cutters in service including five cutters over 200 feet in length. Older cutters dating back to before the Civil War were retired and newer cutters replaced them, all were designed with steam propulsion.

==== Changes in the RCS School of Instruction ====
Shoemaker was responsible as the new Chief of the Revenue Cutter Service in enlarging the school's training cutter, USRC Salmon P. Chase so that it could accommodate more cadets. The training cutter had no specific homeport and put into various ports to only to re-provision and get mail. During his tenure, Shoemaker acquired the land for Chase to use as a homeport and for repairs at Arundel Cove in Curtis Bay, Maryland. A small two-story building was built for the school as well as a 400-foot pier for the Chase. This site eventually became the service's vessel construction and overhaul facility and today is known as the United States Coast Guard Yard.

== Retirement and death ==
Upon reaching the statutory retirement age of 64, Shoemaker was placed the Retired List on 27 March 1905. He was succeeded by Senior Captain Worth G. Ross.

On 8 May 1908, Shoemaker was promoted to the rank of Captain-Commandant on the Revenue Cutter Service Retired List by Act of Congress. (Note: The rank Captain-Commandant was both a title and a rank in the Revenue Cutter Service and was authorized by Congress in 1908. Captain-Commandant was equivalent to a U.S. Navy captain. The next lower RCS rank was senior captain which was equivalent to a Navy commander. RCS captains were equivalent to Navy lieutenant commanders.) He died at his home in Woodstock, Virginia on 11 July 1913 and is buried at Arlington National Cemetery

== Notes ==
=== References cited ===
- "Charles F. Shoemaker". Notable People. U.S. Coast Guard Historian's Office.
- "Revenue Marine's New Chief" (PDF). The New York Times. 20 March 1895.
- "The United States Coast Guard Yard". 119 Years of "Service to the Fleet". U.S. Coast Guard.
- Canney, Donald L. (1995). U.S. Coast Guard and Revenue Cutters, 1790–1935. Naval Institute Press, Annapolis, Maryland. ISBN 978-1-55750-101-1.
- Johnson, Robert Irwin (1987). Guardians of the Sea, History of the United States Coast Guard, 1915 to the Present. Naval Institute Press, Annapolis, Maryland. ISBN 978-0-87021-720-3.
- Kern, Florence. "Traditions of the United States Coast Guard" (asp). Commandants. U.S. Coast Guard Historian's Office.
- King, Irving H. (1996). The Coast Guard Expands, 1865–1915: New Roles, New Frontiers. Naval Institute Press, Annapolis, Maryland. ISBN 978-1-55750-458-6.
- Noble (1990), Dennis L. "Historical Register U.S. Revenue Cutter Service Officers, 1790–1914" (PDF). Coast Guard Personnel. U.S. Coast Guard Historian's Office.
- Noble (1994), Dennis L. (1994). That Others Might Live: the U.S. Life-Saving Service, 1878–1915. Naval Institute Press, Annapolis, Maryland. ISBN 978-1-55750-627-6.

Military offices
Preceded by Leonard G. Shepard	Commandant of the Coast Guard; 1895–1905	Succeeded by Worth G. Ross
