= Leonard G. Shepard =

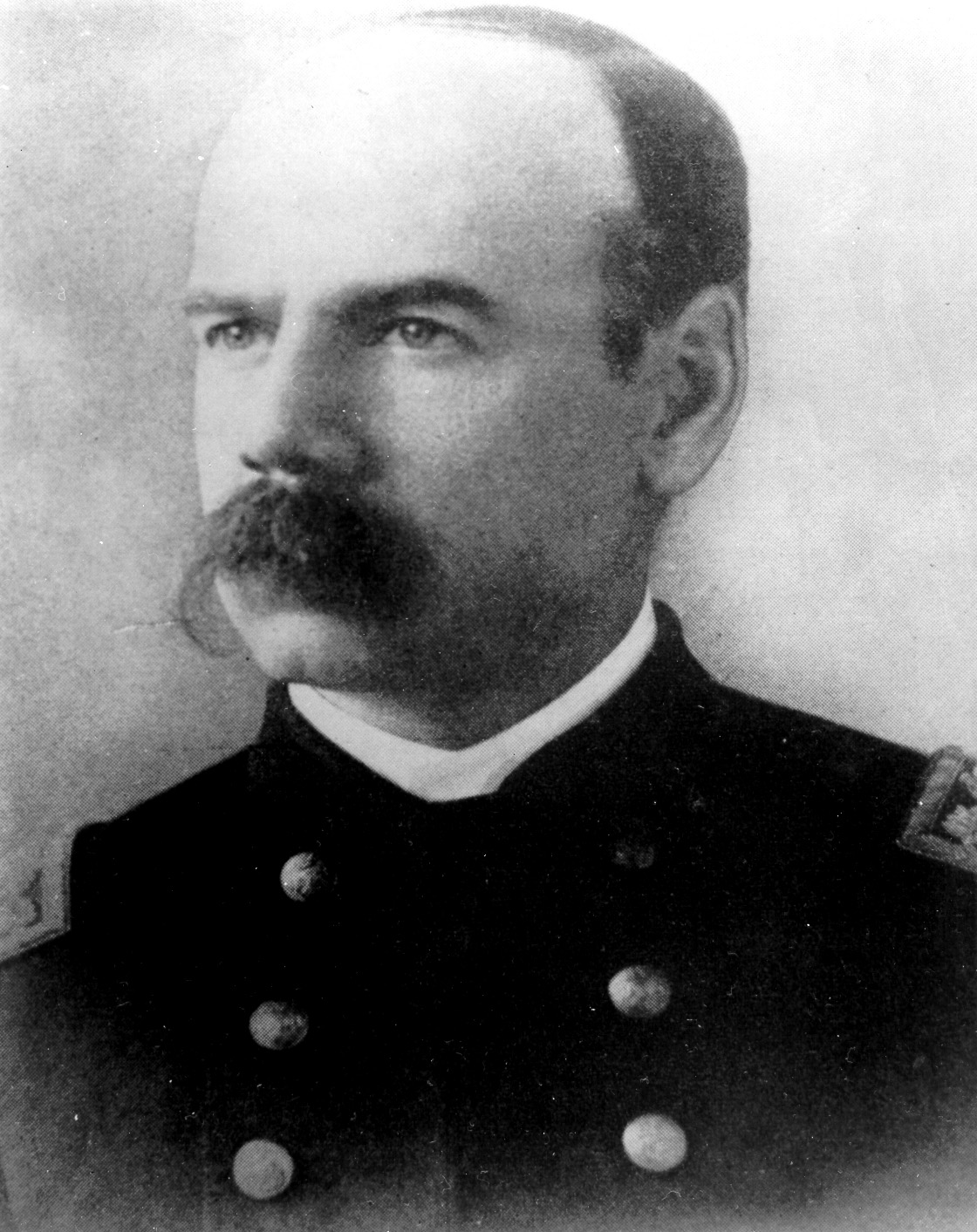
- Captain Leonard G. Shepard, USRCS
- Born: November 10, 1846; Dorchester, Massachusetts, US
- Died: March 1, 1895 (aged 48) Washington, D.C., US
- Branch: United States Coast Guard; United States Revenue Cutter Service
- Service years: 1865–1895
- Rank: Captain (Note: RCS captains were equivalent to Navy lieutenant commanders.)
- Commands: Chief, Revenue Cutter Service

Leonard G. Shepard (November 10, 1846 – March 1, 1895), was a captain in the United States Revenue Cutter Service and was appointed in 1889 by Secretary of the Treasury William Windom as the first military head of the service since 1869. His formal title was that of Chief of the Revenue Marine Division of the Department of the Treasury. Although he was never formally known as Commandant, he is recognized today as the first Commandant of the Coast Guard.

== Military career ==
=== Early years ===
Shepard was born in Dorchester, Massachusetts, in 1846. He entered the Revenue Cutter Service as a third lieutenant on September 15, 1865, reporting aboard the USRC Moccasin. He was promoted to second lieutenant in 1869 and first lieutenant in 1870. As first lieutenant he commanded the USRC James Guthrie in Baltimore as well as USRC Washington and USRC Grant in New York. After his promotion to captain on March 14, 1878 he took command of the USRC McLane at Galveston, Texas, and the USRC George Bibb at Ogdensburg, New York. In 1883 he took command of the Revenue Cutter School at New Bedford, Massachusetts, and the USRC Salmon P. Chase. From 1887 to 1889 he was in command of the USRC Rush in San Francisco, California, and just before his appointment to chief of the division was serving as commanding officer of the USRC Bear.

=== Chief of Revenue Cutter Service ===
On December 14, 1889, Shepard was named to the position of Chief of the Revenue Marine Division. Although the Revenue Marine Bureau existed prior to the appointment, the command of the bureau belonged to the Chief of Customs Collectors, and as such Captain Leonard G. Shepard became Chief of the "Revenue Marine Division" and is considered to be the first Commandant. He immediately began a campaign of reform and petitioned for funds for new cutters and a plan for officer retirement pensions. His plan was to quit spending money on repair of older vessels that did not meet modern needs of the service and acquire new vessels that served more efficiently. The officer situation was one of many officers serving well into their eighties, thus hindering younger officers chances of promotion. This affected the morale of the service considerably and kept many able young men from joining the service. The senior officers stayed on in command because of a lack of a retirement pension. Shepard closed the Revenue Cutter School at Fort Trumbull, Connecticut, soon after assuming the office of Chief of the Revenue Cutter Division to dramatize the lack promotion opportunities and the last class of Cadets graduated in May 1890. He also fought for the passage of HR 6723; a bill that created a medical review board that examined senior officers and eliminated those not fit to command.

Secretary of the Treasury John Griffin Carlisle pointed out that about a third of the officers of the Revenue Marine could not perform their duties because of advanced age and pressed Congress for relief. Shepard fought for passage of the retirement plan in Congress. The bill was signed into law on March 2, 1895, and Shepard died of pneumonia on March 14, twelve days later. Although the new retirement plan did not solve all of the problems of the Revenue Marine Service, it did force the retirement of 39 officers determined by a medical board to be unhealthy enough for duty and gave them a half pay allowance. This allowed the Revenue Marine to free up billets and give junior officers better promotion opportunities.

== Death and legacy ==
Captain Shepard died March 14, 1895, of pneumonia in Washington, D.C., leaving his wife, Isabel S. Shepard and three children. By petitioning for newer design cutters and a retirement plan for older officers, Shepard is given credit for continuing his civilian predecessors efforts to modernize the service. During his tenure several newer steel hull tugs and larger cutters were acquired by the service. Although his retirement plan was not perfect, it did set the stage for Shepard's successors make additional improvements.

== Notes ==
Footnotes

Citations

References cited

- Traditions of the United States Coast Guard U.S. Coast Guard Historian's Office
- Leonard G. Shepard Biography U.S. Coast Guard Historian's Office
- Register of the Commissioned Officers of the United States Revenue Marine, to April 1, 1875", p 20, Coast Guard Historical Documents, U.S. Coast Guard Historians Office
- Johnson, Robert Erwin, Guardians of the Sea, Naval Institute Press, Annapolis, 1987, ISBN 0-87021-720-8
- King, Irving H., The Coast Guard Expands 1865-1915: New Roles, New Frontiers, Naval Institute Press, Annapolis, 1996, ISBN 1-55750-458-X
- Strobridge, Truman R. and Dennis L. Noble, Alaska and the U.S. Revenue Cutter Service, 1867-1915, Naval Institute Press, Annapolis, 1999, ISBN 1-55750-845-3

Military offices
| Preceded by Position Created | Commandant of the Coast Guard; 1889—1895 | Succeeded by Charles F. Shoemaker |
