= USS Perry =

USS Perry may refer to the following United States Navy ships that are named for Oliver Hazard Perry:

- USS Perry (1843), a sailing brig 1843–1865.
- USS Commodore Perry (1859), an armed side wheel ferry built in 1859 and purchased by the US Navy 2 October 1861
- USS Perry (DD-11), Bainbridge-class destroyer 1900–1919.
- USS Perry (DD-340), a Clemson-class destroyer converted into a high speed minesweeper and redesignated DMS-17 effective 19 November 1940. Served 1921–1944; sunk in Battle of Peleliu.
- USS Perry (DD-844), was a Gearing-class destroyer 1945–1970.
- USS Oliver Hazard Perry (FFG-7), a guided-missile frigate 1976–1997

== See also ==
- SS Oliver Hazard Perry, a Liberty ship. See List of Liberty ships (M–R).
- Oliver Hazard Perry-class frigate
- USNS Matthew Perry (T-AKE-9), a Lewis and Clark-class dry cargo ship
- USRC Commodore Perry (1865), a revenue cutter in service from 1865 through 1883.
- USRC Commodore Perry (1884), a revenue cutter in service from 1884 through 1910.
