= William Bowser =

William Bowser may refer to:

- William John Bowser (1867–1933), politician in British Columbia
- William Charles Bowser (1915–2006), member of the all-black Pea Island Life-Saving Station
