= Fish Island (Massachusetts) =

Island in New Bedford, Massachusetts, United States

Coordinates: 41°38′19.6″N 70°55′9.8″W

Fish Island is an island in the U.S. state of Massachusetts. The island is located in the Acushnet River east of Sconticut Neck; within the city of New Bedford.

The USRC Salmon P. Chase (1878) was moored at the island when she was built in 1787.

== See also ==
- Fish Island (disambiguation), for other places by this name
