= Fish Island =

Fish Island may refer to:

== Islands ==
=== Canada ===
- Fish Island, West Isles Parish, New Brunswick
- Fish Island (Ottawa River), Ottawa River, Ontario
- Fish Island, Malpeque Bay, Prince Edward Island

=== United States ===
- Fish Island (Alaska), in the Gulf of Alaska
- Fish Island (Massachusetts)
- Fish Island (New Hampshire) - see List of islands of New Hampshire
- Fish Island (New York), in Irondequoit Bay
- Fish Island (Wisconsin)

== Other uses ==
- Fish Island, London, an area of the city
- Fish Island Site, a historic site south of St. Augustine, Florida
- Fish Island, former name of Dexter, New York, a village
- Fish Island, a 2012 video game released by NHN Entertainment Corporation
- "Fish Island", a 2013 digital single by Tsuri Bit, a Japanese girl group

== See also ==
- Fiskeøen (Fish Island), an artificial island in one of The Lakes, Copenhagen, Denmark
- Motu Ika (Fish Island), another name for Motukaraka Island, off Auckland, New Zealand
- Yúshān (Fish Island) - see List of places depicted in the Mao Kun map, an early 15th century map
- Fish Islands, a group of islands off the coast of West Antarctica
