= USNS Matthew Perry =

Cargo ship of the United States Navy

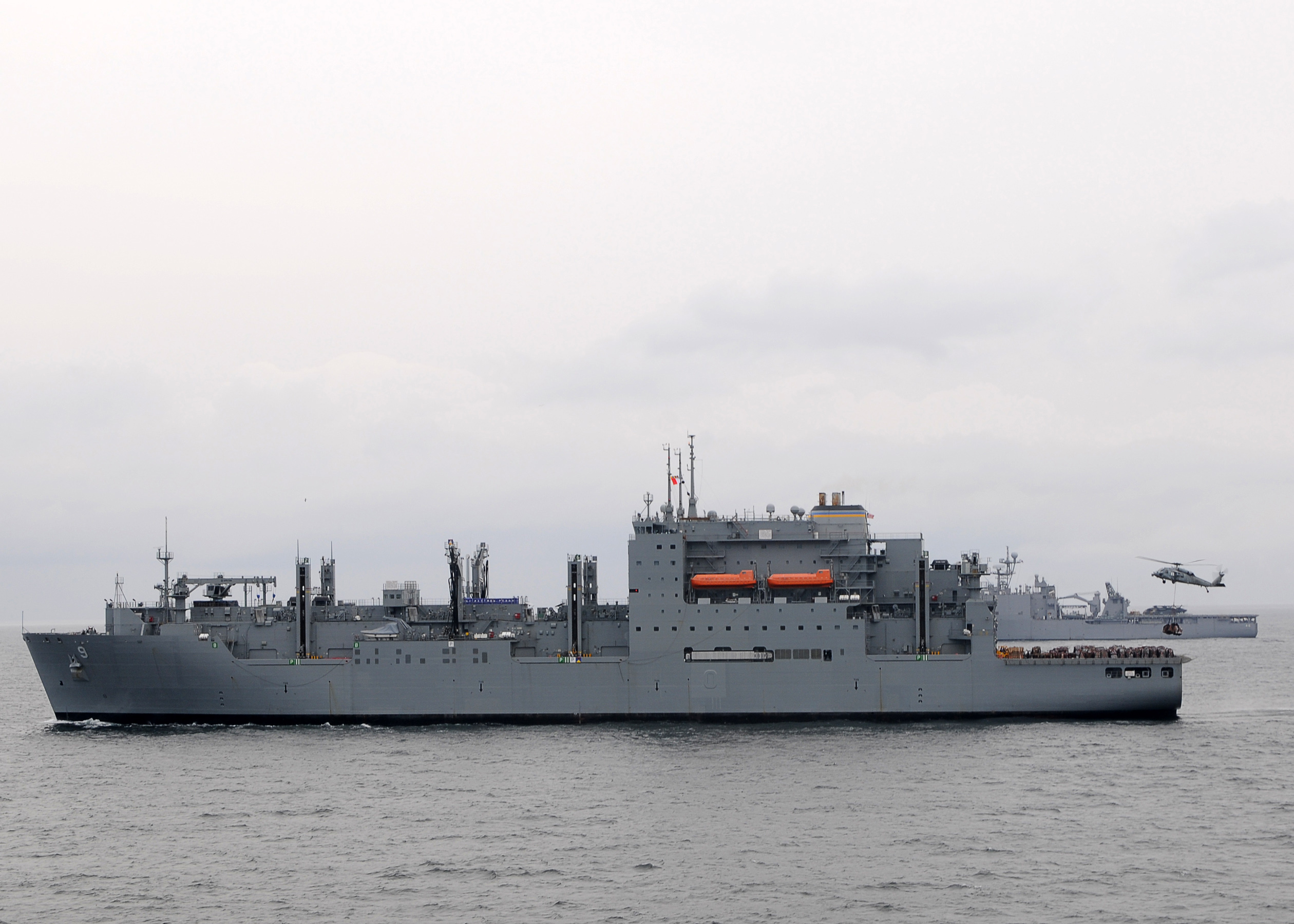
- USNS Matthew Perry

History
- Name: Matthew Perry
- Namesake: Matthew C. Perry
- Awarded: 30 January 2006
- Builder: National Steel and Shipbuilding
- Laid down: 3 October 2008
- Launched: 16 August 2009
- Sponsored by: Hester G. Evans
- Christened: 16 August 2009
- Acquired: 24 February 2010
- Identification: IMO number: 9383625; MMSI number: 367840000; Callsign: NPER
- Status: in active service

General characteristics
- Class & type: Lewis and Clark-class dry cargo ship
- Displacement: 23,852 tons light, 40,298 tons full, 16,446 tons dead
- Length: 210 m (689 ft) overall, 199.3 m (654 ft) waterline
- Beam: 32.3 m (106 ft) extreme, 32.3 m (106 ft) waterline
- Draft: 9.1 m (30 ft) maximum, 9.4 m (31 ft) limit
- Propulsion: Integrated propulsion and ship service electrical system, with generation at 6.6 kV by FM/MAN B&W diesel generators; one fixed pitch propeller; bow thruster
- Speed: 20 knots (37 km/h)
- Range: 14,000 nmi (26,000 km; 16,000 mi) at 20 knots (37 km/h; 23 mph)
- Capacity: Max dry cargo weight: 5,910 LT (6,000 t); Max dry cargo volume: 783,000 cu ft (22,200 m^{3}); Max cargo fuel weight: 2,350 LT (2,390 t); Cargo fuel volume: 18,000 bbl (2,900 m^{3})
- Complement: 49 military, 123 civilian
- Electronic warfare & decoys: Nulka decoy launchers
- Armament: 2–6 × 0.5 in (12.7 mm) machine guns; or 7.62 mm medium machine guns
- Aircraft carried: two helicopters, either Sikorsky MH-60S Knighthawk or Aerospatiale SA330J Puma

USNS Matthew Perry (T-AKE-9) is a Lewis and Clark-class dry cargo ship of the United States Navy, named in honor of Commodore Matthew C. Perry (1794–1858), who led the effort to open Japan to trade with the West.

The contract to build Matthew Perry was awarded to National Steel and Shipbuilding Company (NASSCO) of San Diego, California, on 30 January 2006. Her keel was laid down on 3 October 2008. She was launched and christened on 16 August 2009, sponsored by Hester Evans, a great-great-great-granddaughter of Commodore Perry.

== Service ==
Matthew Perry was one of several participating in disaster relief after the 2011 Tōhoku earthquake and tsunami. During the 21 days of operations, Matthew Perry completed 17 separate replenishment events, delivering more than 1.5 million US gallons (5,700 m^{3}) of fuel and transporting relief supplies.

USNS Matthew Perry underwent repair and upgrades from 11 to 27 March 2023 at Kattupalli Shipyard of Larsen & Toubro in India. After the refit, the ship returned to the Indo-Pacific theatre for operations. This was a result of the U.S.–India 2+2 Ministerial Dialogue in April 2022, where US was represented by Secretary of Defense Lloyd Austin and U.S. Secretary of State Antony Blinken.

== See also ==
- USS Perry, for other ships named after Commodore Perry
