= Pea Island Life-Saving Station =

U.S. Life-Saving Service station

Coordinates: 35.7163°N 75.4936°W

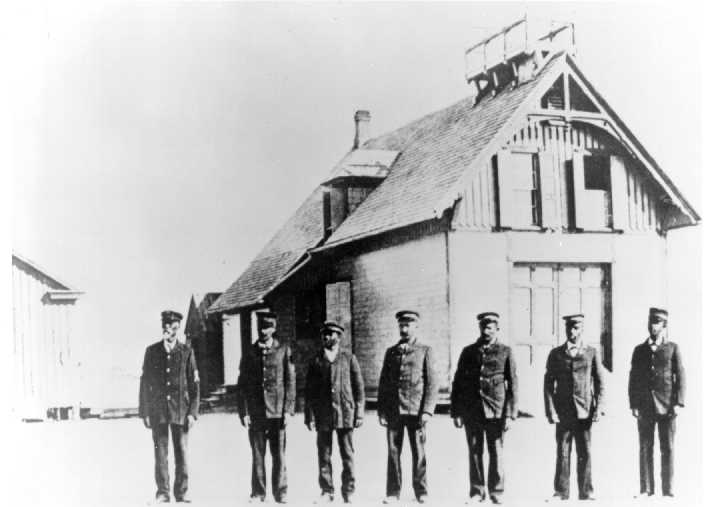
Keeper Richard Etheridge (on left) and the Pea Island Life-Saving crew in front of their station, circa 1896

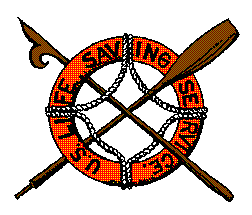
Emblem of the U.S. Life-Saving Service

Pea Island Life-Saving Station was a life-saving station on Pea Island, on the Outer Banks of North Carolina. It was the first life-saving station in the country to have an all-black crew, and it was the first in the nation to have a black man, Richard Etheridge, as commanding officer. On August 3, 2012, the second of the Coast Guard's 154-foot Sentinel-Class Cutters, USCGC Richard Etheridge (WPC-1102), was commissioned in his honor.

== Richard Etheridge, early history ==
Richard Etheridge was born a slave on January 16, 1842, the son and the property of John B. Etheridge, on the Outer Banks of North Carolina. Large plantations didn't exist in the Outer Banks; African Americans were relatively few and slavery limited. During his early life, Richard Etheridge, like most Outer Bankers, learned to work the sea, fishing, piloting boats, and combing the beach for the refuse of wrecks. Even though it was illegal to do so, his master also taught him to read and write.

After the outbreak of the American Civil War in April 1861, the Outer Banks were the site of one of the first Northern invasions, in February 1862. General Ambrose Burnside, the Union commander, employed black labor to build fortifications for his armies, and the island soon became a refugee camp for fugitive slaves. The Union eventually realized the potential that the active recruitment of Southern blacks offered their forces, not only by bolstering the Union ranks but by simultaneously diminishing the opposition's labor supply. Black troops began being enlisted by the summer of 1863; Richard Etheridge joined on August 28 of that year.

The 36th United States Colored Troops, in which Etheridge enlisted, spent much of its first year of active duty like most of the other black units in the Union Army—playing secondary roles. After limited anti-guerrilla actions in North Carolina, the soldiers of the 36th served as guards at the prisoner-of-war camp at Point Lookout, Maryland, occasionally raiding into neighboring Virginia for contraband goods: supplies, horses, cattle, or slaves. Necessity eventually allowed the 36th to play a more prominent role in the fight for freedom and union. The 36th distinguished itself during the September 1864 Battle of New Market Heights, Virginia. During the fighting, the Union forces overran Lee's strong position and won an important victory on the road to take the Confederate capital at Richmond. Etheridge was promoted to sergeant two days after the battle. While fighting on the front to end slavery, Etheridge was also active in the struggle behind Union lines to end the mistreatment of blacks. During his duty in Virginia in 1865, he and William Benson drafted the following letter to Major General Oliver O. Howard, the Commissioner of the Freedmen's Bureau, protesting the mistreatment that blacks on Roanoke Island were suffering at the hands of the occupying army. "[T]he white soldiers break into our houses act as they please steal our chickens rob our gardens and if anyone defends their-Selves against them they are taken to the guardhouse for it, so our families have no protection when Mr. Streeter is here to protect them and will not do it." Etheridge and Benson's letter was not merely a cry of grievance but was also a call for action. "General we the soldiers of the 36th U.S. Co Troops having families at Roanoke Island humbly petition you to favor us by removing Mr. Streeter the present Asst Supt at Roanoke Island under Captain James." Etheridge signed the letter, "on behalf of humanity."

At the War's close, Etheridge, now a Regimental Commissary Sergeant, and the black troops of the Army of the James were regrouped into the Ninth and Tenth Cavalry and sent to Texas. These units would become known as the "Buffalo Soldiers." Instances of abuse against black soldiers were rife in the period immediately following the Civil War. The men were due ten months back-pay, had had their rations cut in half, and were unruly over the continued reports of mistreatment that were coming from their families back home.

== Flawed rescue ==
In December 1866, Etheridge left the service at Brazos Santiago, Texas. He returned to the Outer Banks, where he married. Etheridge made his living fishing and serving in the newly formed Life-Saving Service, first at Oregon Inlet in 1875, then at Bodie Island.

In the early years, nepotism and political cronyism tainted many Life-Saving Service appointments. A series of highly publicized maritime disasters off the North Carolina coast appeared to be leading to the annexation of the LSS into the Navy. In two months, 188 lives and more than a half million dollars in property was lost off the Outer Banks, within sight and with little or inexpert assistance from the lifesavers on shore. The New York World reported, "It begins to be painfully clear that the terrible loss of Human life … on the North Carolina coast … must be attributed directly to the inefficiency of the Life-Saving Service."

In 1879, the commander of the Pea Island station (called a "keeper") was a white man and he had a crew of both white and black men. A rescue effort in November 1879 was bungled, and the keeper and some of the crew were held responsible. The Revenue Cutter Service investigated the situation, fired the white keeper, and appointed in his place Richard Etheridge, one of the best surfmen on the North Carolina coast, to serve as keeper.

In order to address the issue of inefficiency in the service, the best lifesavers would need to be put in charge of stations. Etheridge, one of only eight African Americans in the entire Life-Saving Service, was promoted from the lowest ranking surfman at neighboring Bodie Island station to take over the incompetently run station at Pea Island. The LSS inspector, 1st LT Charles F. Shoemaker; despite warnings from locals, recommended Etheridge to the position, wrote: "[Etheridge] is thirty eight years of age, [of] strong robust physique, intelligent, and able to read and write sufficiently well to keep the journal of a station. [He is] one of the best surfman on this part of the North Carolina coast". The report concluded: "[I am] aware that no colored man holds the position of keeper in the Life-Saving Service, and yet such as are surfmen are found to be among the best on the coast of North Carolina" "I am fully convinced that the interests of the Life-Saving Service here, in point of efficiency, will be greatly advanced by the appointment of this man to the Keepership of Station No. 17."

== First African-American crew ==
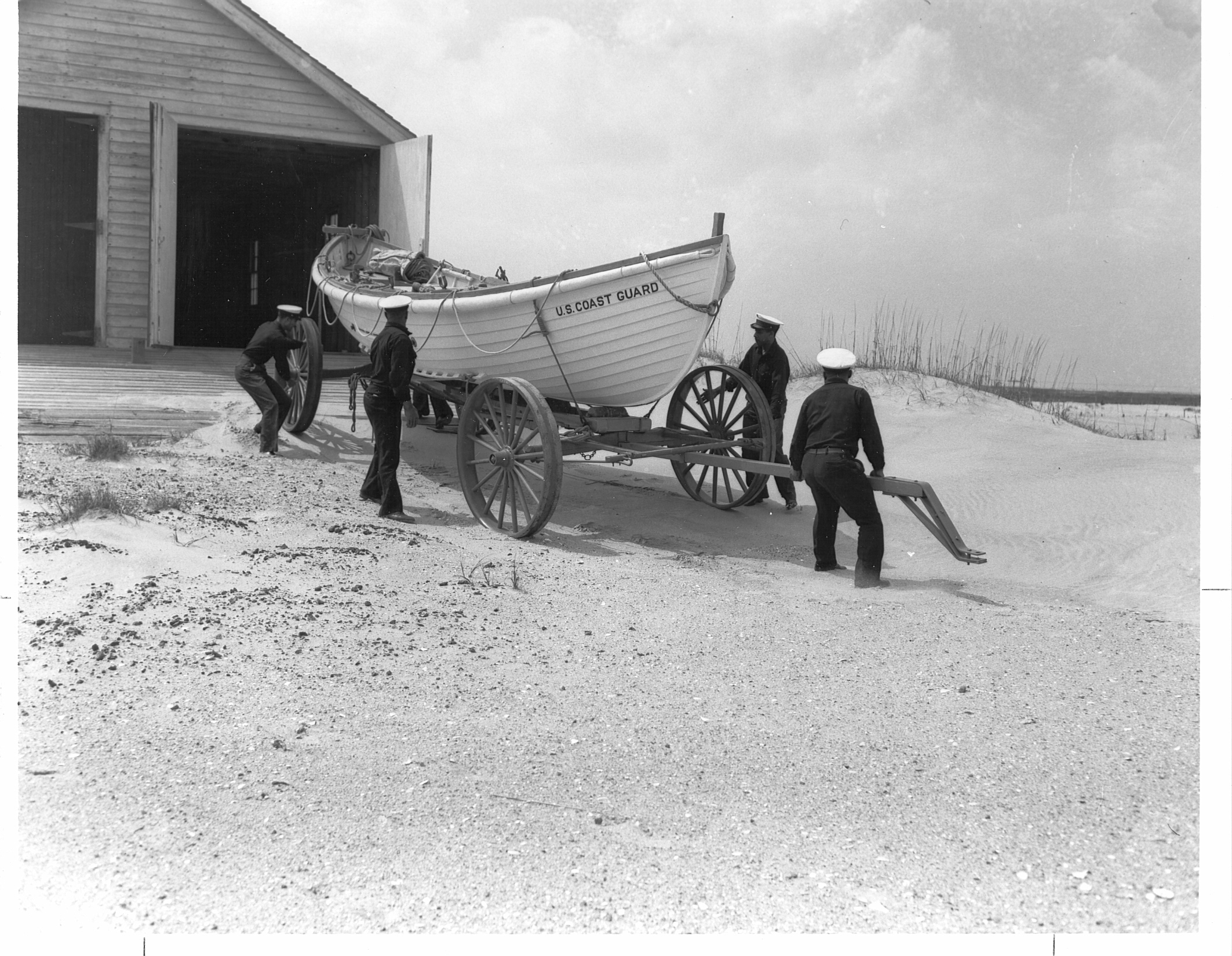
Pea Island USCG crewmen in 1942, showing lifeboat and boathouse

Richard Etheridge was the first African American to hold the rank of keeper of a life-saving station. When he was appointed, the white surfmen refused to serve under him. Thus, although other black men had served as surfmen at Pea Island and other stations, Pea Island Station came to be manned entirely by a black keeper and crew. The other LSS stations, in North Carolina as well as throughout the nation, would be manned and run by whites.

Five months after Etheridge took charge, arsonists burnt the station to the ground.

== Rescue of the E.S. Newman ==
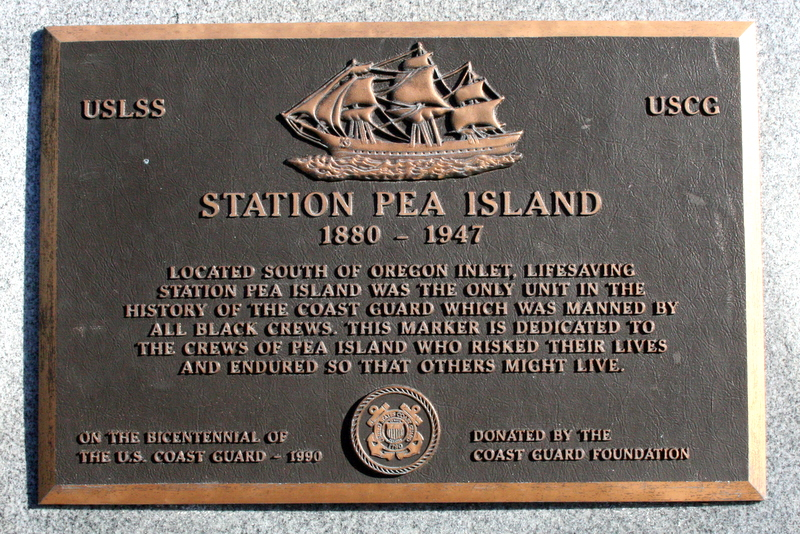
Memorial plaque on the grounds of the North Carolina Aquarium on Roanoke Island

Given the scrutiny he and his men were under, Etheridge knew that the slightest error could result in his or one of his crewmen's dismissal, that inadequacies, no matter how small, could result in the reinstatement of a white keeper and crew. So he ran the station with military ardor. All of his vigorous and exacting preparation paid off on the terrible night of October 11, 1896 when the schooner E.S. Newman grounded south of the station.

The captain of the vessel had his wife and three-year-old son on board when it was driven ashore during a hurricane on October 11, 1896. The storm was so bad that Keeper Etheridge had suspended beach patrols. Still, from the station, a surfman, Theodore Meekins, thought he saw a distress signal, and fired off a Coston flare to see if there would be a response. Meekins and Etheridge watched carefully, then saw the schooner acknowledge with a flare of her own.

The Pea Island crew with the help of a mule team then pulled the beach cart with the rescue equipment and surfboat along the beach towards where the distress signal had been seen. Huge waves washing ashore made this especially difficult. Finally, when the crew arrived at the scene of the wreck, they found that the wave conditions were so great that the surfboat could not be launched, nor could a breeches buoy be used because the beach was so inundated by waves that the anchor for the buoy line could not be placed in the sand. Two surfmen volunteered to swim out in the waves to attempt to reach the wreck. They eventually did reach the schooner and managed to heave a line aboard. Nine times the surfmen went into the water and one by one the passengers and crew were all rescued, starting with the captain's three-year-old son. According to local lore, Meekins, who was reputedly the best swimmer of the group, made every voyage out to the Newman.

In the following days, the Newman's captain searched for and found the piece of the side that held the vessel's name and donated it to the crew as an offering of his thanks. For a century, this would be the only award the Pea Island crew received for their efforts. The 1896 Pea Island crew voted to give the wooden sideboard of the Newman to Theodore Meekins, the young surfman who first spotted the distress signal and who swam out to the wreck several times during the rescue. (Fifth from left in photo.) Meekins took the board to his farm on Roanoke Island and nailed it to the top of his barn. He served at Pea Island for 21 more years, until his death in 1917, when, while boating home on leave, a storm came up at Oregon Inlet, and he drowned trying to swim to shore.

== Later years ==
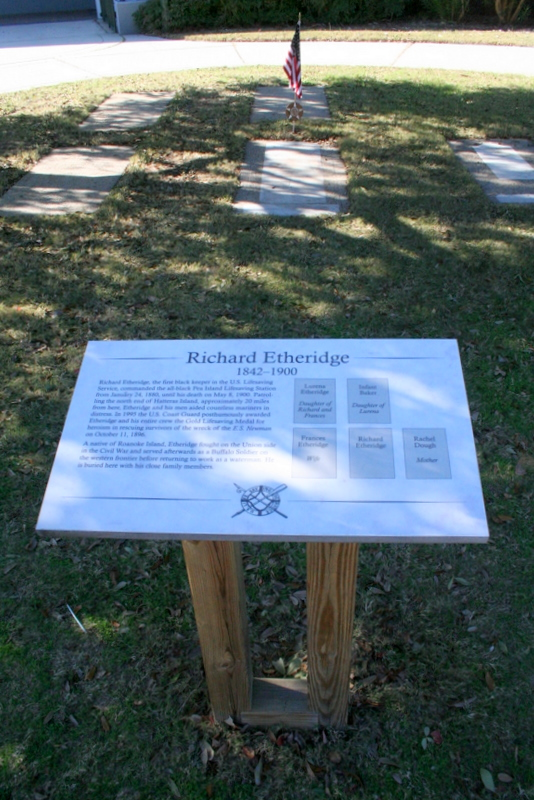
Etheridge gravesite

Etheridge served as the keeper at Pea Island for twenty years. In January 1900, Etheridge, at the age of 58, fell ill and died at the station. Pea Island continued to be manned by an all-black crew through the Second World War. The station was decommissioned in 1947. One of the last surviving surfmen to serve at the station, William Charles Bowser, died at age 91 on June 28, 2006. Herbert Collins, who served in the 1940s and put the locks on the station when it was closed, died Sunday, March 14, 2010. In 1996, the Coast Guard awarded the Gold Life-Saving Medal posthumously to the keeper and crew of the Pea Island station for the rescue of the people of the E.S. Newman. Etheridge and his family are buried at the Pea Island Life Saving Station memorial on the grounds of the North Carolina Aquarium on Roanoke Island.

== Legacy ==
In 2010, the town of Manteo erected a bronze statue honoring Richard Etheridge.

The Sentinel-class cutter USCGC Richard Etheridge was named in his honor. She was commissioned on 3 August 2012 at her home port of Port Everglades, Florida.

In 2021, the Coast Guard Bears football team representing the United States Coast Guard Academy dedicated their season's uniforms to Pea Island Life-Saving Station 17.

Etheridge is the protagonist and narrator in Black Cloud Rising, 2022 historic fiction by David Wright Faladé. He is among the first enlistees in the African Brigade, later known as 36th United States Colored Infantry Regiment. The plot follows them from March 1863 to the time of his service at Pea Island Life-Saving Station.

== See also ==
- Chicamacomico Life-Saving Station
- United States Life-Saving Service

== Notes ==
Citations

References cited

- Noble, Dennis L.,That Other Might Live, The U.S. Life-Saving Service, 1878 – 1915, Naval Institute Press, Annapolis, 1994, ISBN 1-55750-627-2
- Shanks, Ralph, Wick York and Lisa Shanks (Ed) U. S. Life-Saving Service: Heroes, Rescues and Architecture of the Early Coast Guard, Costaño Books, Petaluma, CA, 1996, ISBN 0-930268-16-4
- Wright, David and David Zoby, Fire on the Beach: Recovering the Lost Story of Richard Etheridge and the Pea Island Lifesavers, Scribner, New York, 2001, ISBN 978-0684873046
