= USS Oliver Hazard Perry =

Oliver Hazard Perry-class frigate

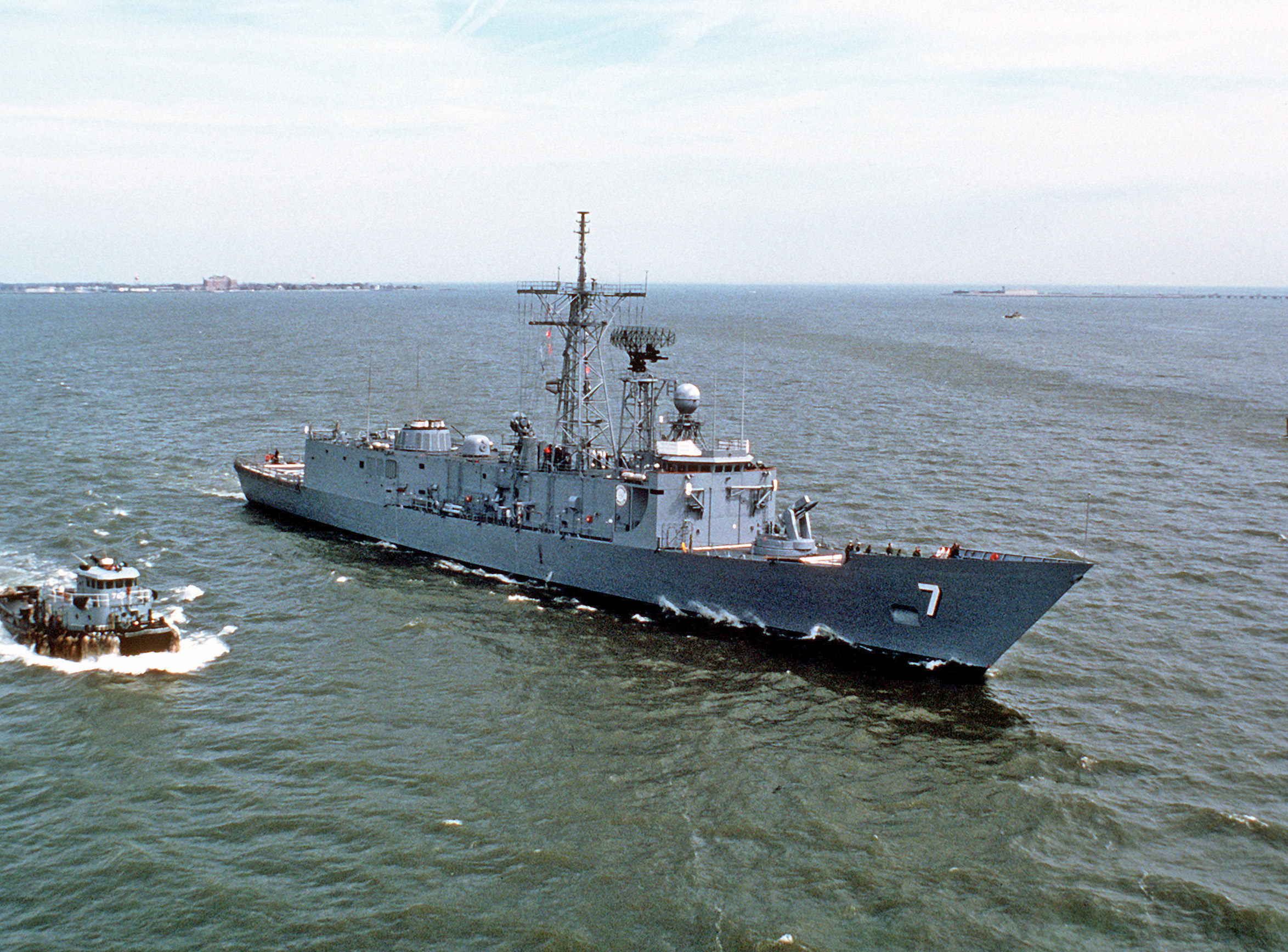
- USS Oliver Hazard Perry underway during a Great Lakes cruise, 24 August 1979.

History

United States
- Name: Oliver Hazard Perry
- Namesake: Oliver Hazard Perry
- Ordered: 10 March 1973
- Builder: Bath Iron Works
- Laid down: 12 June 1975
- Launched: 25 September 1976
- Commissioned: 17 December 1977
- Decommissioned: 20 February 1997
- Stricken: 3 May 1999
- Home port: Mayport (former)
- Identification: Code letters:NOHP; Hull number: FFG-7
- Motto: "Don't Give Up the Ship"
- Nickname(s): Gallant Leader; Old Hockey Puck
- Honors and awards: See Awards
- Fate: Scrapped, 9 September 2005
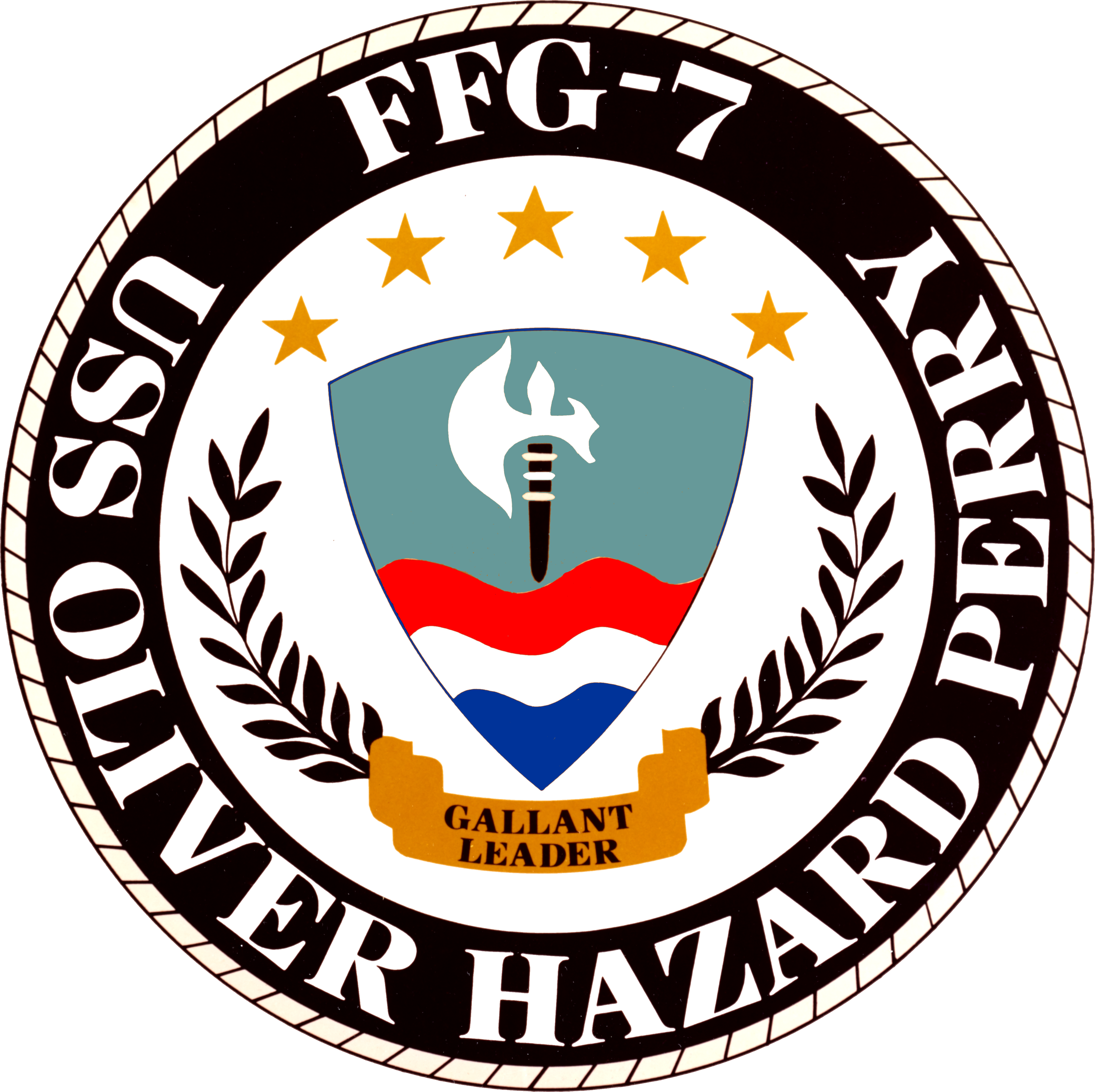
- Badge

General characteristics
- Class & type: Oliver Hazard Perry-class frigate
- Displacement: 4,100 long tons (4,200 t), full load
- Length: 445 feet (136 m), overall
- Beam: 45 feet (14 m)
- Draught: 22 feet (6.7 m)
- Propulsion: 2 × General Electric LM2500-30 gas turbines generating 41,000 shp (31 MW) through a single shaft and variable pitch propeller; 2 × Auxiliary Propulsion Units, 350 hp (260 kW) retractable electric azimuth thrusters for maneuvering and docking.
- Speed: over 29 knots (54 km/h)
- Range: 5,000 nautical miles at 18 knots (9,300 km at 33 km/h)
- Complement: 15 officers and 190 enlisted, plus SH-2 detachment of roughly six officer pilots and 15 enlisted maintainers
- Sensors & processing systems: AN/SPS-49 air-search radar; AN/SPS-55 surface-search radar; CAS and STIR fire-control radar; AN/SQS-56 sonar.
- Electronic warfare & decoys: AN/SLQ-32
- Armament: As built: 1 × OTO Melara Mk 75 76 mm/62 caliber naval gun; 2 × Mk 32 triple-tube (324 mm) launchers for Mark 46 torpedoes; 1 × Vulcan Phalanx CIWS; 4 × .50-cal (12.7 mm) machine guns.; 1 × Mk 13 Mod 4 single-arm launcher for Harpoon anti-ship missiles and SM-1MR Standard anti-ship/air missiles (40 round magazine); Note: As of 2004, Mk 13 systems removed from all active US vessels of this class. Note: Unlike other Perry-class frigates, USS Oliver Hazard Perry was not equipped with a Vulcan Phalanx CIWS when built.
- Aircraft carried: 1; SH-2 Seasprite helicopter (ship was to have capability for two helicopters, but never carried more than one due to flight deck and hangar size limitations)
- Aviation facilities: Hangar Bay, Helicopter Pad

USS Oliver Hazard Perry (FFG-7) was the lead ship of the Oliver Hazard Perry class of guided-missile frigates. She was named for Oliver Hazard Perry, an American naval hero who was victorious at the 1813 Battle of Lake Erie. Oliver Hazard Perry (FFG-7) was the first ship and, as of 2026, the only ship of the U.S. Navy to bear the name (although there were five previous US Navy ships named for Oliver Hazard Perry – four named USS Perry and one named USS Commodore Perry). Oliver Hazard Perry was in service from 1977 to 1997 and was scrapped in 2005.

The class was originally intended as austere "low" category guided missile frigates (compared with the high capability Spruance class) for General Purpose and Anti-Air convoy escort. They were built under a cloud of controversy, with their very light gun armament and lack of redundancy and duplicated systems in event of ship being hit. They were regarded by the Reagan administration and Secretary John Lehman as not part of the 500 ship navy plan, but ultimately proved useful as anti-submarine ships if fitted to carry Seahawks and towed arrays and into the 21st Century as low grade patrol ships making up the numbers in a USN desperately short of escorts.

== Construction and career ==
Oliver Hazard Perry was ordered from Bath Iron Works on 30 October 1973 as part of the FY73 program, and was laid down on 12 June 1975, launched on 25 September 1976, and commissioned on 17 December 1977. She was ordered as PFG-109 but was redesignated as FFG-7 in the 1975 fleet designation realignment on 1 June 1975, before she was laid down.

=== Launch incident ===
During her launch ceremony on 25 September 1976, the ship found herself briefly stuck on the slip-way. Film star John Wayne appeared from the crowd of watching dignitaries, climbed the launch ceremony platform, and gave the bow of the frigate – which was by this time starting to move slightly – a shove with one hand, and so John Wayne famously appeared to have 'pushed' a US warship down her slip-way.

=== Shock Trial Testing ===
Oliver Hazard Perry was one of the few lead ships to be subjected to shock trials. These series of trials conducted early in the life of the ship put this steel hull / aluminum superstructure to the test. The proximity of the tests (seen in associated pictures), caused many of the machine mounts and components to become warped or damaged. This damage created alignment problems for the engineering and combat systems teams in the years to come. The ship regularly required waivers on machine performance due to the warping of many mounting brackets. The shock tests also created cracks in the aluminum superstructure that required frequent repairs. However, this did not affect the overall readiness of the ship, nor did it prevent Oliver Hazard Perry from achieving the record for the most-ever hours put on the GE LM2500 Main Propulsion engine.

=== Fate ===
After 19.2 years of active service, Oliver Hazard Perry was decommissioned on 20 February 1997, in Mayport, FL. Though she was stricken on 3 May 1999, Oliver Hazard Perry was held in the museum donation category at the former Navy shipyard in Philadelphia, Pennsylvania. A group had hoped to bring her to Toledo, Ohio as a museum ship and a memorial for the Battle of Lake Erie. The group was unable submit a viable financial plan together in time so the Perry was sold for scrap in December 2005.

== Awards ==
- Navy Meritorious Unit Commendation
- Navy E Ribbon
- National Defense Service Medal
- Armed Forces Expeditionary Medal
- Sea Service Deployment Ribbon (multiple)
- Special Operations Service Ribbon Star (1 battle star)

== Gallery ==
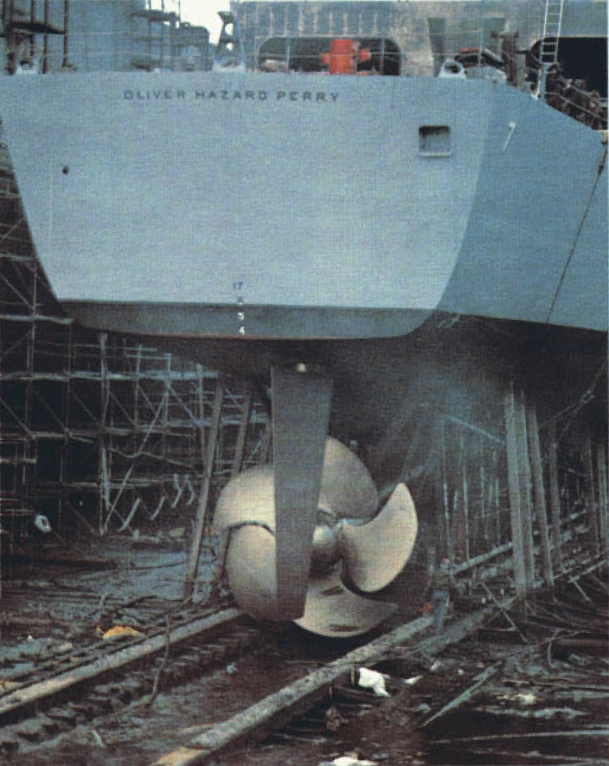
Aft view of Oliver Hazard Perry in 1976

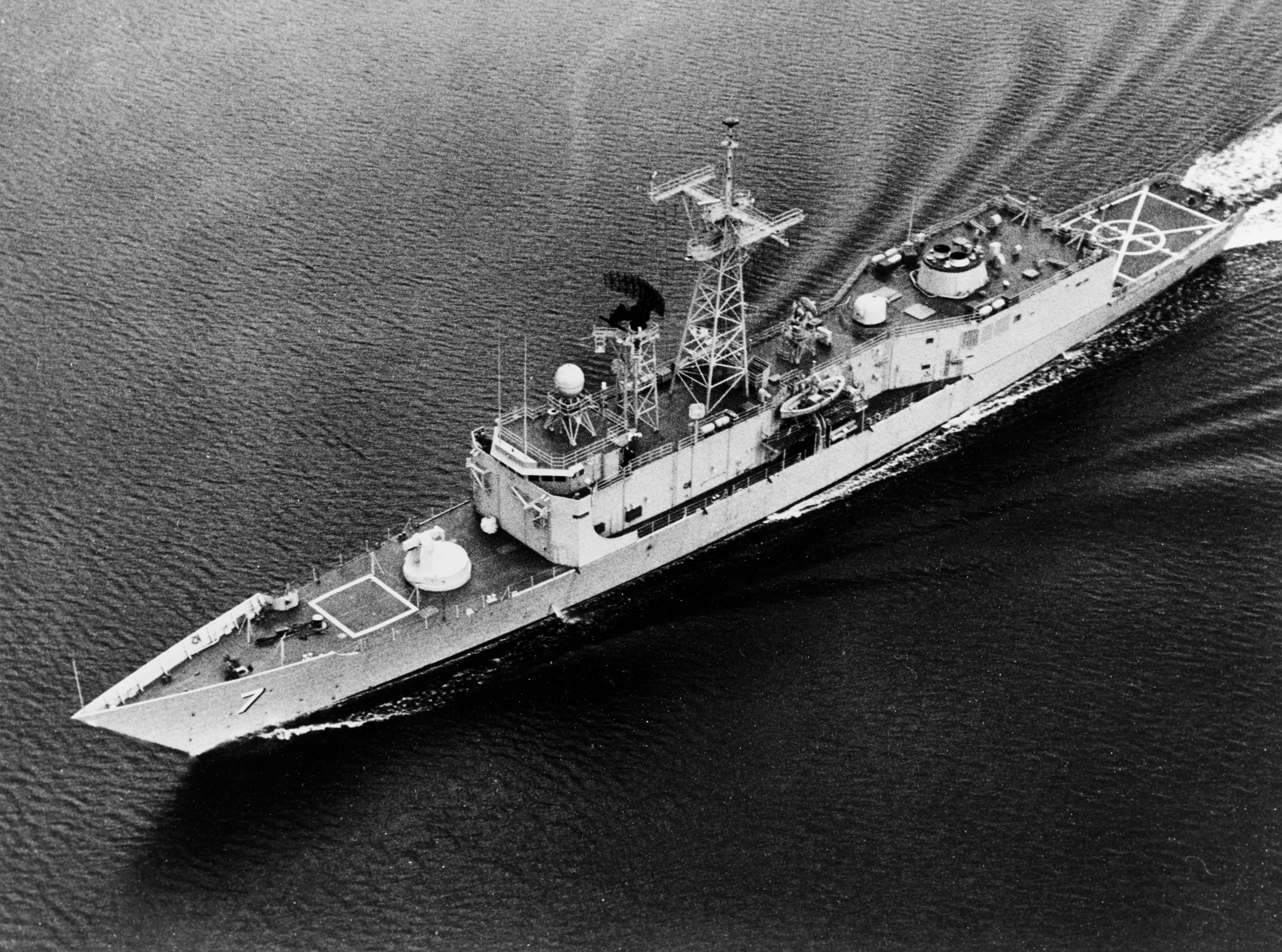
Oliver Hazard Perry underway in late 1977
