= Fish Island Site =

- U.S. National Register of Historic Places
- Location: St. Johns County, Florida
- Nearest city: St. Augustine
- NRHP reference No.: 72001460
- Added to NRHP: June 13, 1972

The Fish Island Site is a historic site south of St. Augustine, Florida. It is the site of one of Florida's earliest fruit plantations, and was established by Jesse Fish, from New York, who acquired the property in 1763. The plantation produced oranges, figs, peaches, pomegranates and limes. It is located on the Matanzas River. On June 13, 1972, it was added to the U.S. National Register of Historic Places.

== See also ==
- Fish Island (disambiguation), for other places by this name
