= USRC James C. Dobbin =

Ship of the U.S. Revenue Cutter Service

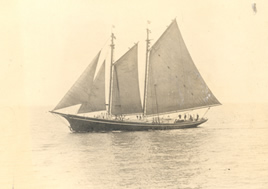
- Historic photograph of the USRC Dobbin

History

United States
- Builder: J.M. Hood, Somerset, Massachusetts
- Launched: 13 July 1853
- Christened: 18 April 1853
- Commissioned: 1853
- Decommissioned: 1881
- Fate: Sold 6 April 1881 to Henry Brothers, $5156
- Notes: became merchant vessel John L. Thomas

General characteristics
- Class & type: Cushing class 1853
- Type: topsail schooner
- Displacement: 174 tons
- Length: 93 ft 9 in (28.58 m)
- Beam: 22 ft 6 in (6.86 m)
- Draft: 9 ft 9 in (2.97 m)
- Complement: 13
- Armament: 1 × 32-pounder (1861)
- Notes: Known most familiarly as USRC Dobbin

USRC James C. Dobbin was a Cushing class revenue cutter of the United States Revenue Cutter Service. In commission from 1853 to 1881, she was a named after President Franklin Pierce's secretary of the Navy, James Cochrane Dobbin. She was initially stationed at Wilmington, North Carolina, but in 1856 was moved to Savannah, Georgia. She was seized by a secessionist mob on 3 January 1861 at Savannah and the officers and crew were held in irons. After the local customs inspector protested the seizure, Joseph E. Brown, the governor of Georgia ordered the cutter and crew released. Dobbin was the only revenue cutter based in the South to escape to the North before the Civil War. On 26 April 1861, she was ordered to Philadelphia, Pennsylvania, to receive heavier armament and then assigned to New York City. In 1863 Dobbin was reassigned to Portland, Maine, where she remained until being ordered to Baltimore, Maryland, in December, 1876 to be refitted as a training ship. The first eight cadets of the newly established Revenue Cutter School of Instruction reported aboard Dobbin and they set sail on their first practice cruise on 24 May 1877. One of the eight cadets was future commandant of the Coast Guard, Worth G. Ross. The following summer, she was replaced by the newly constructed training cutter USRC Salmon P. Chase and Dobbin returned to service as a revenue cutter until she was sold in 1881.
