= USRC William H. Seward =

Ship of the U.S. Revenue Cutter Service

History

United States
- Name: USRC William H. Seward
- Namesake: William H. Seward
- Builder: unknown, built at Wilmington, Delaware
- Cost: $34,600
- Completed: unknown
- Commissioned: April 1864
- Decommissioned: 10 June 1901
- Fate: Sold 7 June 1901 for $1,015
- Notes: became merchant barge Eugenia

General characteristics
- Type: Schooner
- Displacement: 240 tons
- Length: 137 ft (42 m)
- Beam: 22 ft (6.7 m)
- Draft: 7 ft (2.1 m)
- Complement: 30
- Armament: 2 guns of unknown caliber

USRC William H. Seward was a Revenue Cutter Service schooner built in Wilmington, Delaware and purchased in Philadelphia, Pennsylvania for $34,600 in April 1864. Initially ordered to New York for temporary duty, she was then assigned to Wilmington, North Carolina in July 1864. In 1874, she was moved to Key West, Florida and transferred to Galveston, Texas the following year.

On 7 April 1880, Seward was assigned to Bay St. Louis, Mississippi where she primarily patrolled from Mobile Bay to Port Eads. She was also ordered to "cruise to New Orleans occasionally." On 30 September 1885, her patrol area was extended into the Mississippi River, as far south as "Port Eads and the Passes." On 13 July 1895 her cruising grounds were "from Mobile, Alabama to West End, Lake Pontchartrain, with occasional visits into the Mississippi River to the Head of the Passes."

On 12 June 1897, she was ordered to Ship Island to aid in quarantine duty with the Marine Hospital Service ship MH Surgeon. She was then repaired and fumigated at Pensacola, Florida in September 1897. In February 1898, she was ordered to Mobile for the Mardi Gras Carnival. On 12 April 1898 she was ordered to be laid up at Mobile, where she remained until recommissioned on 1 July. On 20 May 1901 she was ordered sold and was decommissioned a final time on 10 June 1901 at Mobile. She was sold for $1,015 to Lee Kimball, who renamed her Eugenia and refitted her as a merchant barge.
