= USRC Moccasin =

Ship of the U.S. Revenue Cutter Service

History

United States
- Name: USRC Moccasin
- Builder: Philadelphia Navy Yard
- Cost: $14,000
- Launched: 1864
- Acquired: 18 September 1865 from the Navy
- Decommissioned: 22 November 1890
- Renamed: 10 April 1882 as USRC George M. Bibb
- Fate: Sold 24 October 1891, became merchant vessel Pentagoet
- Notes: During refit in 1882 23.5' was added to length

General characteristics
- Displacement: 192 tons
- Length: 104 ft 5 in (31.83 m) (1865)
- Beam: 22 ft 3 in (6.78 m)
- Draft: 9 ft (2.7 m)
- Installed power: steam, vertical, direct-acting, 34" dia x 32" stroke, 1 boiler, 1 screw
- Speed: 10 knots max.

USRC Moccasin was a United States Revenue Cutter purchased from the U.S. Navy in September 1865 and immediately assigned to duty at Norfolk, Virginia where future Chief of the Revenue Marine Service, Leonard G. Shepard, reported on board as a newly commissioned third lieutenant as part of the commissioning crew. Shepard later served from August 1882 to June 1883 as captain of the cutter.

In May 1866 her homeport was moved to Wilmington, North Carolina where she served until being moved for repairs at the Philadelphia Navy Yard in 1869. After repairs she was assigned to Newport, Rhode Island from 1869 to 1872 and then transferred to Charleston, South Carolina. In 1881, she was taken to the Slater and Read Shipyard in New York City and was lengthened to 128 feet.

On 10 April 1882 she was recommissioned as USRC George M. Bibb and moved to the Great Lakes. George M. Bibb was named after the seventeenth Secretary of the Treasury, George M. Bibb. While winter quarters were at Ogdensburg, New York, she was also stationed at Duluth, Minnesota, Detroit, Michigan and Oswego, New York. After decommissioning in November 1890, she was sold in Buffalo, New York for $2500 to G.H. Kimball of Cleveland, Ohio. She became the merchant vessel Pentagoet which foundered in November 1898.
