= USRC Lincoln =

Ship of the U.S. Revenue Cutter Service

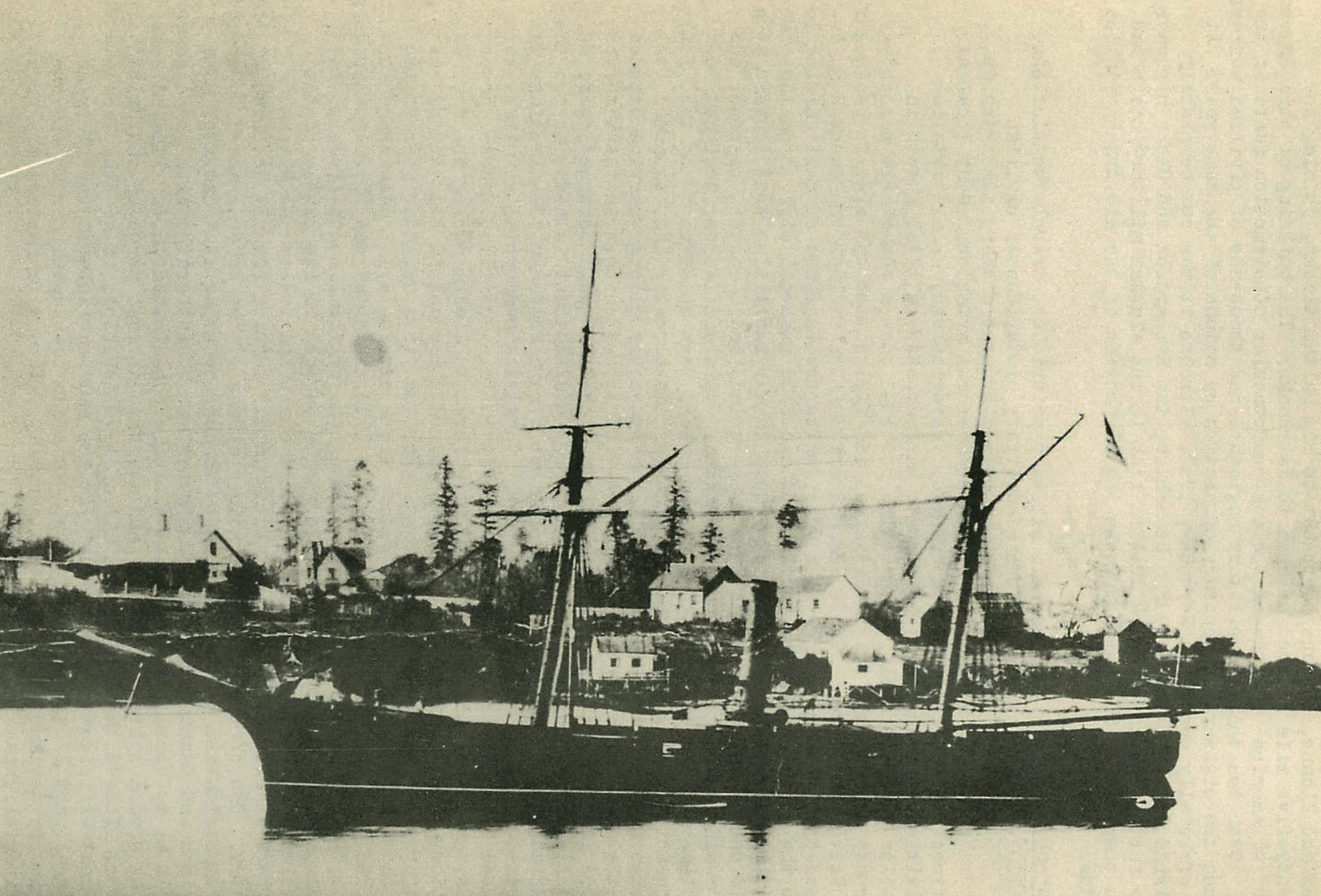
- USRC Lincoln in 1870

History

United States
- Namesake: Abraham Lincoln
- Operator: U.S. Revenue–Marine
- Builder: John F. Fardy and Brother, Baltimore, Maryland, U.S.
- Cost: US$165,000
- Commissioned: 1 September 1865
- Decommissioned: 14 April 1874
- Fate: Sold 14 April 1874 and renamed San Luis
- Notes: Sunk off San Francisco, California 15 February 1887

General characteristics
- Displacement: 550 tons
- Length: 165 ft (50 m)
- Beam: 26 ft (7.9 m)
- Draft: 10 ft (3.0 m)
- Propulsion: steam engine, 1 double oscillating cylinder, 36 in (91 cm) diameter x 30 in (76 cm) stroke
- Sail plan: Fore topsail schooner
- Complement: Unknown
- Armament: Unknown

USRC Lincoln was a revenue cutter commissioned by the U.S. Revenue–Marine and named in honor of the 16th United States president, Abraham Lincoln.

== Construction ==
Lincoln was constructed at Baltimore, Maryland by John F. Fardy and Brother for a total cost of US$165,000. She was a fore topsail schooner and had steam propulsion by way of one double oscillating cylinder engine with 36 in (91 cm) diameter x 30 in (76 cm) stroke. The engine required a great expenditure of lubricating oil and her undersized boiler required a great expenditure of fuel. She had a deck length of 165 ft (50 m), a beam of 26 ft (7.9 m), and a draft of 10 ft (3.0 m). Lincoln was commissioned on 1 September 1865.

== History ==
After commissioning, Lincoln sailed from Baltimore on 16 September 1865 bound for Port Angeles, Washington where she arrived on 21 May 1866. Because the federal government needed information about the newly purchased land of Alaska, Lincoln was dispatched with orders to establish a government office, conduct surveys of the resources, produce accurate charts of the waters and locate a site for a coaling station. On 21 July 1867 she sailed for Sitka, Department of Alaska with her regular crew and several government officials and scientists. Lincoln was the first Revenue–Marine cutter to enter Alaskan waters and enforce federal law. After leaving an officer at Sitka to establish a provincial office, they dropped off a Coast Survey crew nearby whose responsibility was to prepare new navigation charts. The cutter's civilian surgeon collected specimens for the Smithsonian Institution while the cutter cruised north and west of Sitka. During the cruise the Lincoln's crew made surveys, investigated sites for lighthouses and other aids to navigation. After determining that Unalaska would be an ideal site for a coaling station, Lincoln departed Alaska waters and arrived at Port Angeles on 18 November 1867 having traveled 6,297 miles (10,134 km). On 7 March 1868, Lincoln was ordered to San Francisco, California to exchange officers and crews with the cutter Wayanda. On 18 April 1869 she sailed for Alaska a second time, arriving at Kodiak, Alaska on 11 May. After a summer of patrolling and survey work she returned to the Puget Sound on 19 December 1869. Lincoln's last Alaska patrol was from 11 June 1870 to 2 August. After 27 September 1870 she patrolled the Puget Sound area until being sold on 14 April 1874. The new owner renamed her San Luis and she sank off San Francisco on 15 February 1887.
