= USRC James Guthrie =

Ship of the U.S. Revenue Cutter Service

History

United States
- Name: USRC James Guthrie
- Cost: US$16,000
- Launched: 1864 as George W. Loane in Baltimore, Maryland
- Acquired: 11 September 1868
- Commissioned: 11 September 1868
- Decommissioned: 1 April 1882
- Homeport: Baltimore, Maryland
- Fate: Sold 3 April 1882 for US$4030.95

General characteristics
- Type: harbor vessel
- Displacement: 69 tons
- Length: 85 ft (26 m)
- Beam: 17 ft (5.2 m)
- Draft: 8 ft 7 in (2.62 m)
- Propulsion: Steam, 20" diameter x 20" stroke, 1 screw
- Complement: 2 officers, 8 enlisted

USRC James Guthrie was a revenue cutter used as a harbor vessel at Baltimore, Maryland. Originally the merchant tug George W. Loane she was purchased in 1868 for US$16,500 and was named for James Guthrie, twenty first Secretary of the Treasury. Her duties were customs inspections and vessel movement in Baltimore harbor. She was reported unfit for service in 1881, repaired, decommissioned and sold 3 April 1882 to M.J. Ash for US$4030.95.
