= William Charles Bowser =

William Charles Bowser (June 25, 1915 – June 28, 2006) was a member of the all-black Pea Island Life-Saving Station along the Outer Banks of North Carolina, US, from 1935 to 1938. He was one of the last surviving members of the station, which was decommissioned after World War II. After retiring from the coast guard, he started a barber service, then returned to study. He achieved a doctorate in sociology and moved to Florida, where he advised the local board of education.

In March 1996, Bowser received the U.S. Coast Guard Gold Lifesaving Medal at the Navy Memorial in Washington, D.C., on behalf of the crew of the historic 1896 rescue of nine people from the schooner E.S. Newman.
