= USRC Commodore Perry (1865) =

Ship of the U.S. Revenue Cutter Service

History

United States
- Name: USRC Commodore Perry
- Namesake: Commodore Oliver Hazard Perry
- Laid down: 1864
- Launched: 1864 at Buffalo, New York
- Completed: 1865
- Maiden voyage: 1865
- Renamed: Periwinkle, 1884
- Nickname(s): The Commodore
- Fate: Sold in 1884, rebuilt as passenger steamer, sunk 1897.

General characteristics
- Type: Twin screw steamer
- Displacement: 400 long tons (410 t)
- Length: 175 ft (53 m)
- Beam: 53 ft (16 m)
- Draft: 10.33 ft (3.15 m)
- Propulsion: 2 x steam boiler (Whittaker patent); 2 x 13 ft (4.0 m) diameter propellers, one on each side, considerably aft of midships
- Speed: 17.3 kn (19.9 mph; 32.0 km/h)
- Armament: 2 × 24-pounder Dahlgren guns, 2 × 24-pounder Parrott rifles

United States Revenue Cutter Commodore Perry was a 400 long tons (410 t) twin screw steamer built for the United States Revenue Cutter Service for use on the Great Lakes.

== Service history ==
The Commodore Perry, often referred to as the Commodore, was a wooden-hulled, twin screw steamer. She was constructed in Buffalo, New York by Harry Whittacker, using his design and boilers he patented. She was laid down in 1864, made her trial voyage in July 1865 and later commissioned under the command of Captain Douglas Ottinger.

The Commodore served her entire 19-year career on the Great Lakes, enforcing tariff and trade laws, preventing smuggling, protecting the collection of Federal Revenue, and aiding mariners in distress. She was replaced in 1884 by a ship of the same name, USRC Commodore Perry.

== Fate ==
In 1884, the Commodore Perry was sold and converted for use as a single screw passenger steamer. Renamed Periwinkle, She served in this capacity until 30 June 1897, when she caught fire and burnt to waters edge.

== Service highlights ==
- 25 September 1865- Transported former U.S. Ambassador to China Anson Burlingame from Cleveland, Ohio to Detroit, Michigan.
- 4 November 1867 - Helped rescue crewman of the propeller ship Acme, sunk near Dunkirk, New York.
- June 1883 - Final voyage for the Revenue Service.
- 1884 - Sold to H. H. Baker, Buffalo & Lake Erie Excursion Company. Rebuilt as conventional single-screw excursion boat.
