= USRC Commodore Perry (1884) =

Ship of the U.S. Revenue Cutter Service

Coordinates: 57.147222°N 170.211111°W

History

United States
- Name: USRC Commodore Perry
- Namesake: Commodore Oliver Hazard Perry
- Builder: Union Drydock Company, Buffalo, New York
- Cost: $83,000
- Completed: 1884
- Commissioned: 29 June 1884
- Fate: Grounded on 27 July 1910 and abandoned.

General characteristics
- Type: Brigantine-rigged steam cutter
- Displacement: 282 long tons (287 t)
- Length: 165 ft (50 m)
- Beam: 25 ft (7.6 m)
- Draft: 11.17 ft (3.40 m)
- Propulsion: Direct-acting steam engine; 1 propeller
- Complement: 41
- Armament: 2 x unknown type/caliber

United States Revenue Cutter Commodore Perry (1884) was an iron-hulled revenue cutter built in 1884 for revenue service on the Great Lakes, where she served for nine years. In December 1893, she was transferred to the West Coast of the United States, for service in the Pacific Northwest and Alaskan waters, where she served until wrecked near the Pribilof Islands on 27 July 1910.

== History ==
Commodore Perry was built at Union Drydock Company, Buffalo, New York, for a cost of $83,000 ($2.9 million in present-day terms). Like her namesake she replaced, the 1865 USRC Commodore Perry, she was assigned to Lake Erie for duty and her assigned cruising grounds were the entire lake. She was placed out of commission each winter at the close of the shipping season, typically in mid-November, and her crew released. She was placed back in commission at the start of the shipping season, typically during May of each year.

On 23 September 1893, Commodore Perry was ordered to New York to be fitted out for a cruise to the Pacific. She arrived at New York on 20 October 1893 where she carried out "temporary duty" in New York waters. After fitting out, she was ordered to sail to San Francisco, via the Straits of Magellan, on 7 December 1894. Arriving in Callao, Peru, on 24 March 1895, the ship's captain met with the United States Ambassador to Peru, James McKenzie, to discuss providing additional protection during the Peruvian civil war. Officers and 25 men were detailed with arms and one rapid-fire gun to protect the legation until the situation calmed by 29 March, when they left port. She arrived at San Diego on 22 April 1895, for refueling, and arrived at San Francisco three days later. She was then assigned to duty with the Bering Sea Patrol.

Commodore Perry, originally designed for short operating distances of the Great Lakes, was ill-fitted for her new duty in the open sea. Vessels on duty in Alaskan waters required ample food storage room, enough to hold six months' stores and provisions, and enough coal-bunker space to cruise actively for at least two weeks. Commodore Perry was designed to carry only 90 tons. Making room for more coal required stores and provisions to be stored on the deck. Most often, her cruising radius was limited to about 1,500 miles (2,400 km), insufficient to meet the duties demanded of her.

== Spanish–American War ==
On 9 April 1898 she was ordered to "cooperate" with the United States Navy during the Spanish–American War and was ordered to report to the commandant of the Puget Sound Naval Station. She was returned to Treasury Department control on 15 August 1898.

== Post Spanish-American War ==
On 15 November 1906 she was in a minor collision when struck by Montara when Montara missed her landing at Centennial Mill, Seattle, Washington receiving minor damage due to strong current in the Duwamish River.

== Fate ==
While conducting anti-poaching patrols on 27 July 1910, during dense fog, she ran aground off Tonki Point, St. Paul Island in the Pribilof Islands. The ship began taking on water almost immediately. As there was no salvage capability in the Pribilof Islands at that time, the Bering Sea fleet's commanding officer, Captain Daniel Patrick Foley, ordered her stripped and abandoned. At the time of the incident, there were about 50 officers and men aboard. All were saved and distributed amongst the other vessels in the fleet. Expected to go to pieces during the next major storm, the wreck remained visible for the next few years and slowly deteriorated.
