= USRC Salmon P. Chase =

Three-masted bark commissioned in 1878

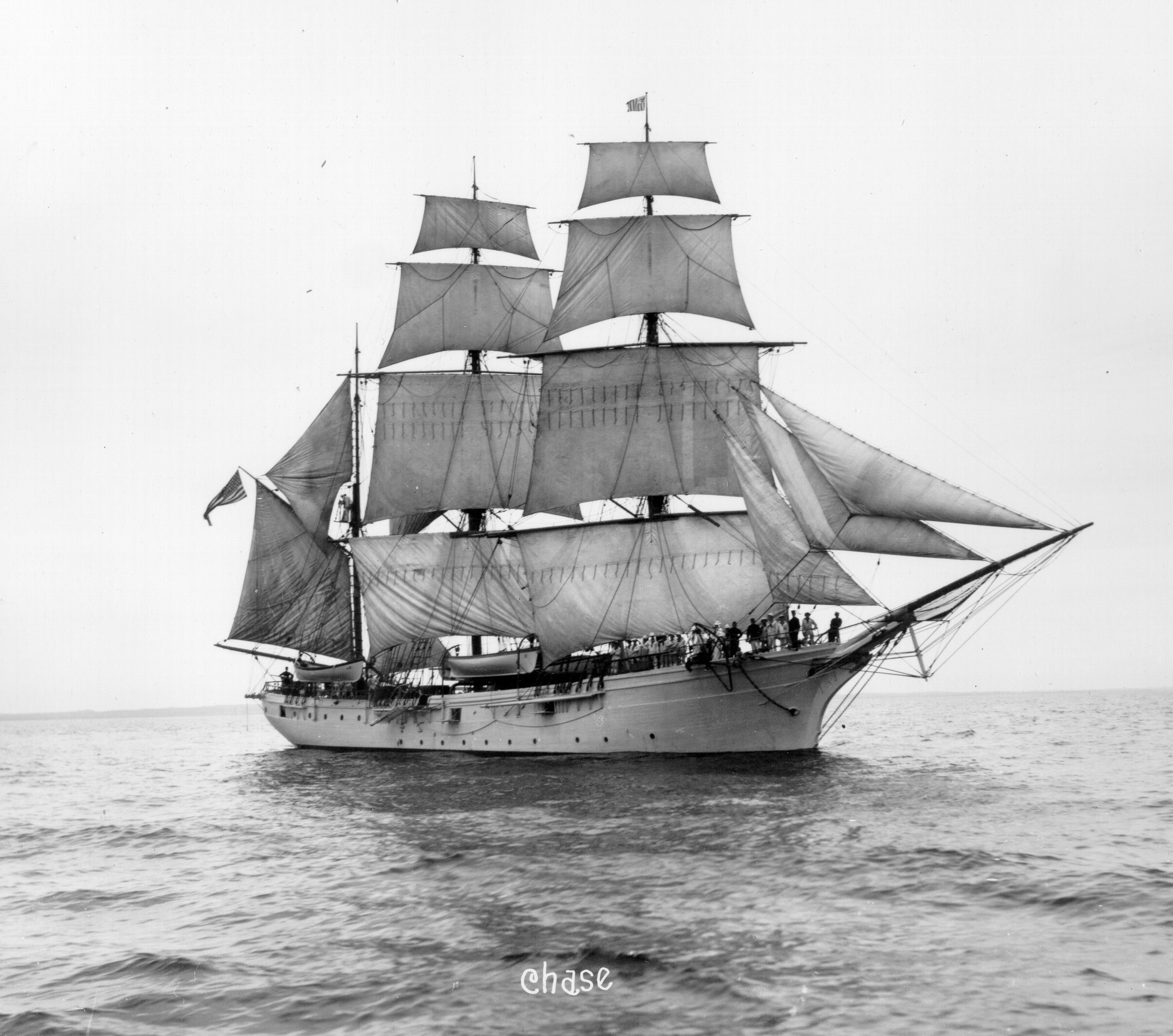
- USRC Salmon P. Chase

History

United States
- Name: USRC Salmon P. Chase
- Builder: Thomas Brown, Philadelphia, Pennsylvania
- Commissioned: 6 August 1878
- Decommissioned: 17 July 1907
- Fate: Transferred to the U.S. Public Health Service, ultimate fate unknown.

General characteristics
- Class & type: Barque, 3 masts
- Displacement: 142 tons (before 1895)
- Length: 115.4 ft (35.2 m) (before 1895)
- Beam: 24.9 ft (7.6 m)
- Draft: 12 ft (3.7 m)
- Propulsion: Sail
- Complement: 4 officers, 28 enlisted
- Notes: School of Instruction training ship

USRC Salmon P. Chase was named after Abraham Lincoln's secretary of the treasury, Salmon P. Chase. It was a three-masted bark with a hull length of 106 feet that was designed for use as a training ship for the cadets of the Revenue Cutter Service School of Instruction.

Shortly after the creation of the Revenue Cutter School of Instruction, Captain J. H. Merryman, the Revenue Cutter Service's Superintendent of Construction, began work on the design for a school ship to replace USRC James C. Dobbin. Chase went into service in the summer of 1878, with its homeport at New Bedford, Massachusetts. She made cadet cruises to Europe, the Azores, the West Indies, and along the eastern coast of the United States. When in New Bedford, she tied up just above the bridge at the north end of Fish Island, Massachusetts. Here she served as a berthing area for the cadets. The government leased buildings on the north end of the island and used the nearby Mitchell Boat Company buildings for classes, drills, and storage. Most classes, however, were held aboard the Chase which had accommodations for a dozen cadets.

In the late nineteenth century the service briefly enjoyed a surplus of officer candidates, largely because the United States Naval Academy at Annapolis, Maryland, was graduating more officers than the U.S. Navy could employ. In 1890 Chase was taken out of commission, and for the next four years the Revenue Cutter Service filled the ranks of its officer corps with Annapolis graduates. The 1890s, however, saw an expansion of the Navy, and in 1895 an Act of Congress provided for the retirement of numerous Revenue Cutter Service officers who were too ill or too old to perform their duties. The result was a shortage of junior officers, and a new lease on life for the service's training bark.

Chase was taken into dry dock, cut in half, and lengthened by 40 feet; the new hull section made room for a total of 25 cadets. The alterations also seem to have affected Chase's sailing qualities. Virtually every photograph taken after the rebuilding shows staysails set on the mizzen stays but none on the main.

In its new configuration Chase remained in service for two more decades, continuing to make practice cruises to Europe, including the port of Cadiz, Spain, in 1904, as well as the east coast ports of the United States. Her last official function was a visit to Hampton Roads, Virginia, for the Jamestown Tricentennial celebration of 1907. Her crew then transferred to USRC Itasca and Chase was given to the U.S. Marine Hospital Service where she saw service as a quarantine vessel. At the end of her government career she was refitted and reclassified as a detention barge.
