= USCGC Benjamin Dailey =

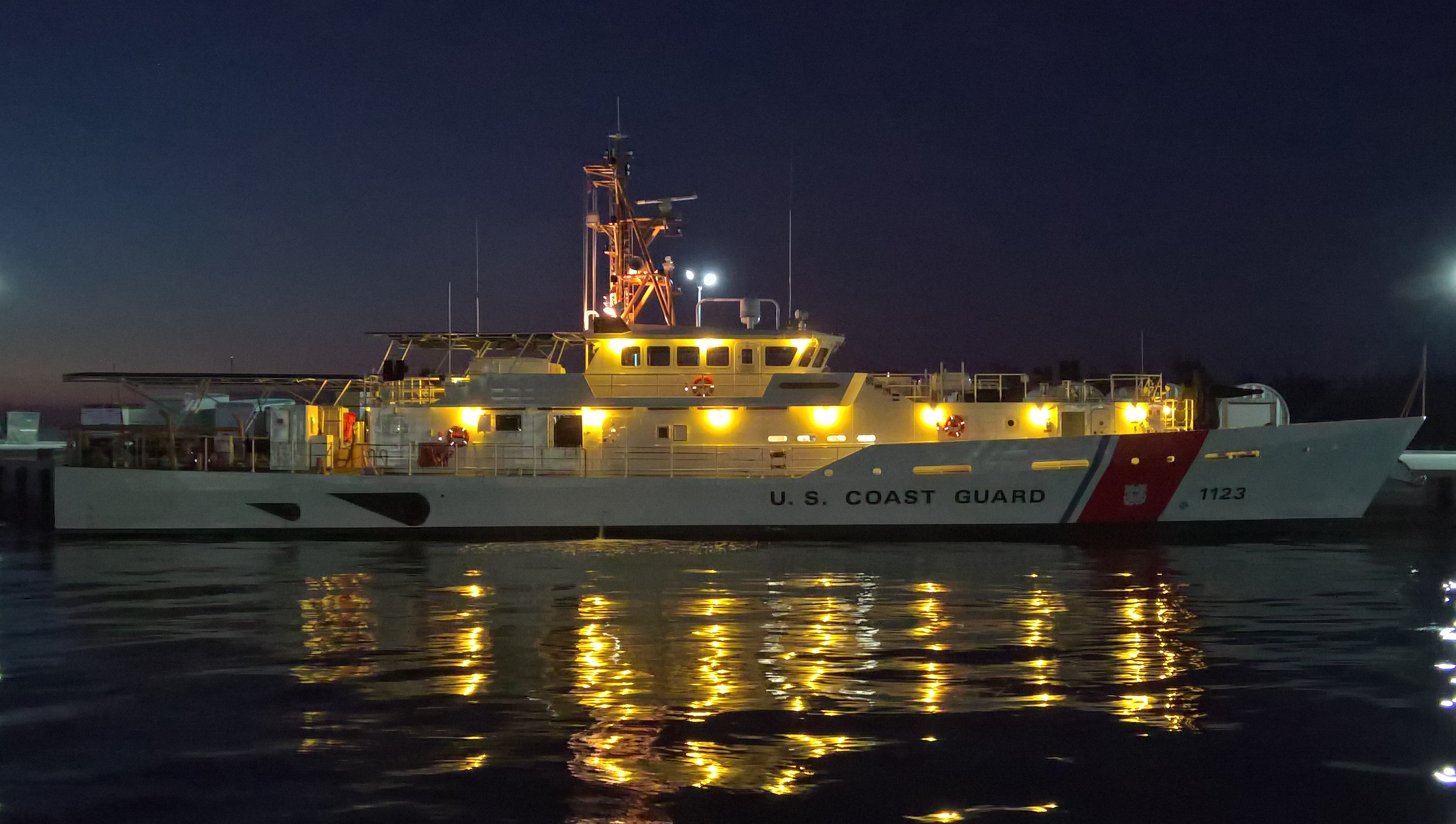
- USCGC Benjamin Dailey after sunset in Key West, Florida

History

United States
- Name: Benjamin Dailey
- Namesake: Benjamin Baxter Dailey
- Operator: United States Coast Guard
- Builder: Bollinger Shipyards, Lockport, Louisiana
- Sponsored by: Pamela Dailey Sawey
- Acquired: April 20, 2017
- In service: July 4, 2017
- Stricken: September 6, 2022
- Identification: MMSI number: 338926423; Callsign: NDOJ; Hull number: WPC-1123
- Motto: Audentes Fortuna Iuvat, "Fortune Favors the Bold"
- Nickname(s): Big Ben
- Fate: Sold for scrap
- Status: Arrived for scrapping at Brownsville, Texas
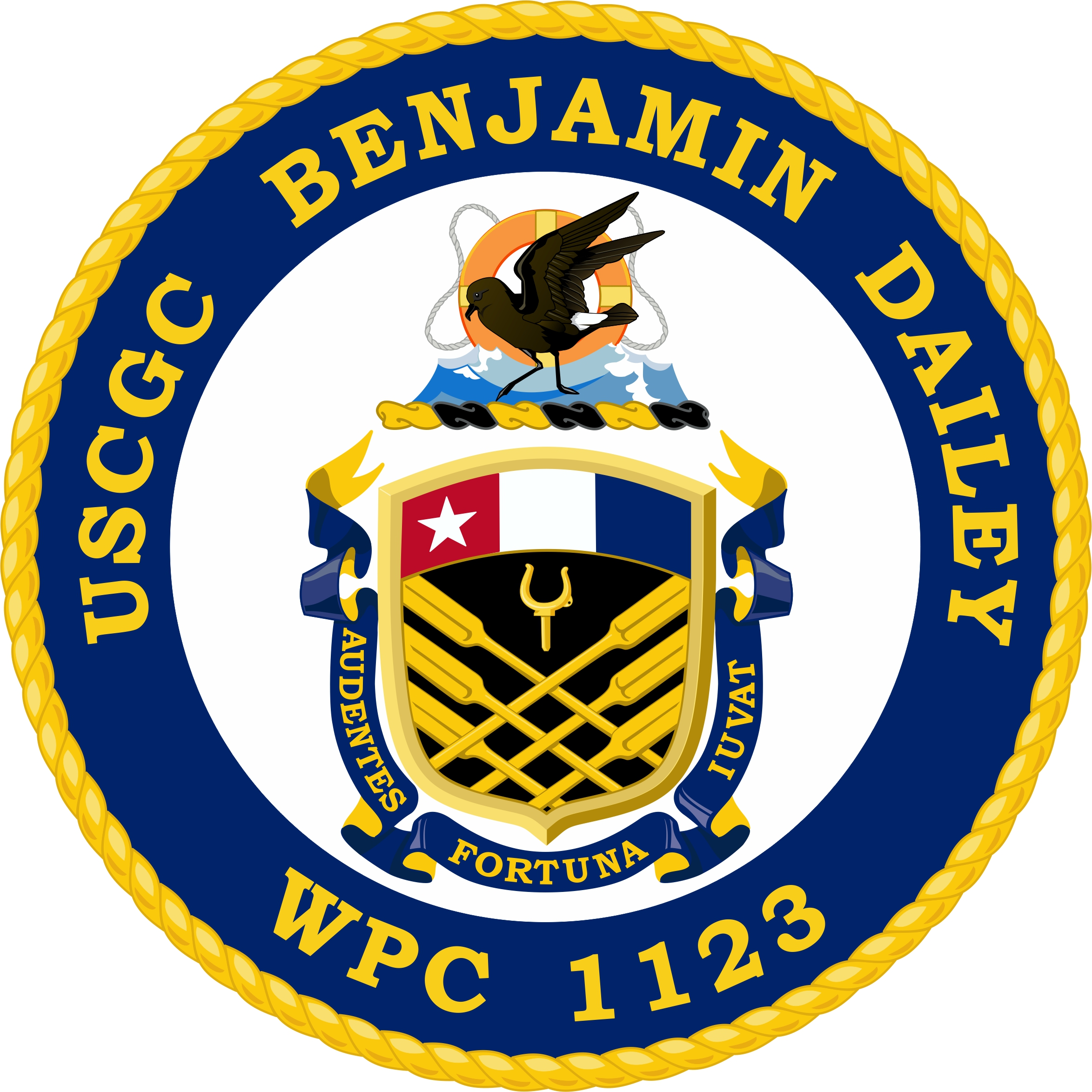
- Badge

General characteristics
- Class & type: Sentinel-class cutter
- Displacement: 353 long tons (359 t)
- Length: 46.8 m (154 ft)
- Beam: 8.11 m (26.6 ft)
- Depth: 2.9 m (9.5 ft)
- Propulsion: 2 × 4,300 kW (5,800 shp); 1 × 75 kW (101 shp) bow thruster
- Speed: 28 knots (52 km/h; 32 mph)
- Range: 2,500 nautical miles (4,600 km; 2,900 mi)
- Endurance: 5-8 days
- Boats & landing craft carried: 1 × Cutter Boat - Over the Horizon Interceptor Small boat callsign: Baxter
- Complement: 4 officers, 20 crew
- Sensors & processing systems: L-3 C4ISR suite
- Armament: 1 × Mk 38 Mod 2 25 mm automatic gun; 4 × crew-served Browning M2 machine guns

USCGC Benjamin Dailey (WPC-1123) was the United States Coast Guard's 23rd Sentinel-class cutter. She was the first cutter of her class stationed in the Coast Guard's Eighth District, with a homeport in Pascagoula, Mississippi.

The vessel's manufacturer, Bollinger Shipyards, of Lockport, Louisiana, delivered the ship to the Coast Guard, in Key West, on April 20, 2017, for final outfitting and crew training.

USCGC Benjamin Dailey was commissioned at a ceremony held in Pascagoula, Mississippi on July 4, 2017.

== Mission ==
The Sentinel-class cutters are lightly armed patrol vessels with a crew of approximately two dozen sailors, capable of traveling almost 3,000 nautical miles, on five-to-eight day missions. The cutter is a multi-mission vessel intended to perform law enforcement, search and rescue, fisheries and environmental protection, and homeland security tasks.

== Namesake ==
Benjamin B. Dailey was the keeper of the Cape Hatteras Lifesaving Station. On December 22, 1884 Dailey, and the crew of six United States Life-Saving Service surfmen he commanded, rescued nine crewmen from the foundering barkentine Ephraim Williams, and were awarded the Gold Lifesaving Medal. Of the twelve Gold Lifesaving Medals awarded by the Life-Saving Service in its first thirty years of operation, seven were awarded for this rescue.

In 2010, Charles "Skip" W. Bowen, who was then the United States Coast Guard's most senior non-commissioned officer, proposed that the cutters in the Sentinel class should be named after enlisted sailors in the Coast Guard, or one of its precursor services, who were recognized for their heroism. In 2014 the Coast Guard announced that Benjamin Dailey would be the namesake of the 23rd cutter.

== Operational history ==
Shortly after being commissioned, Benjamin Dailey deployed on behalf of her operational commander, the Eighth Coast Guard District, conducting counter-narcotics, fisheries enforcement, and border security off southern Texas. In August 2017, the ship provided rescue and assistance for Houston after Hurricane Harvey struck the city. In May 2018, Benjamin Dailey participated in GOMEX 2018, a five-day exercise between the U.S. Coast Guard, the Royal Canadian Navy, and the Mexican Navy in Tampico, Mexico.

On December 10, 2021, the ship was heavily damaged during a fire while in drydock in Tampa, Florida. The vessel was subsequently decommissioned and placed into inactive reserve at the Beaumont Reserve Fleet in Beaumont, Texas on September 6, 2022. She departed the Beaumont Reserve Fleet to be scrapped on March 29, 2024.

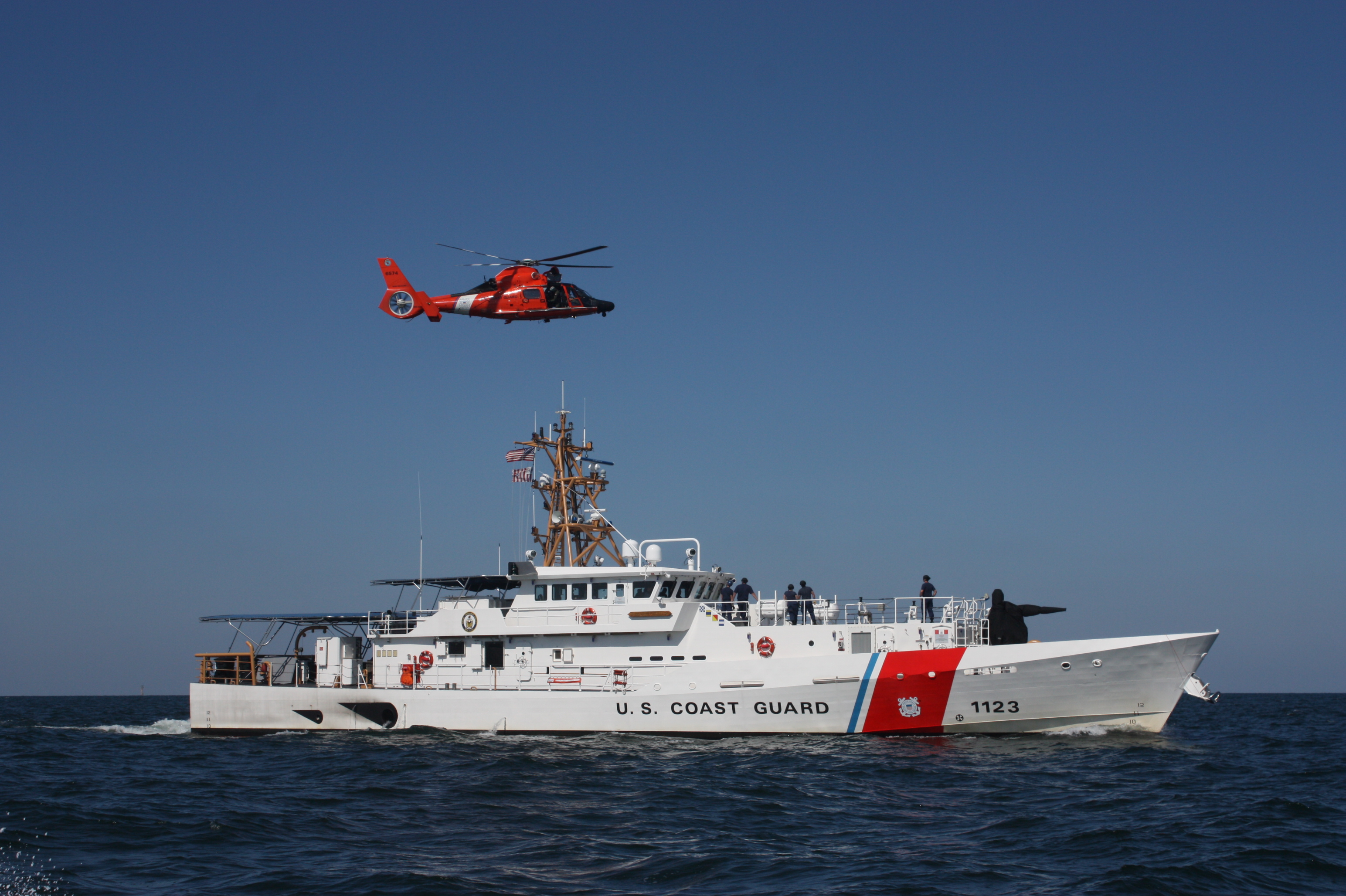
CGC BENJAMIN DAILEY conducting flight operations with a HH-65 from CG Air Station New Orleans
