= Isaac Mayo (disambiguation) =

Isaac Mayo (1794–1861) was a US Navy officer.

Isaac Mayo may also refer to:

- Isaac Mayo (Surfman USCG), saved lives in the 19th-century coast guard
- USCGC Isaac Mayo, the 12th Sentinel-class cutter, named after the coast guard hero
