= USCGC George Cobb =

Keeper-class coastal buoy tender of the United States Coast Guard

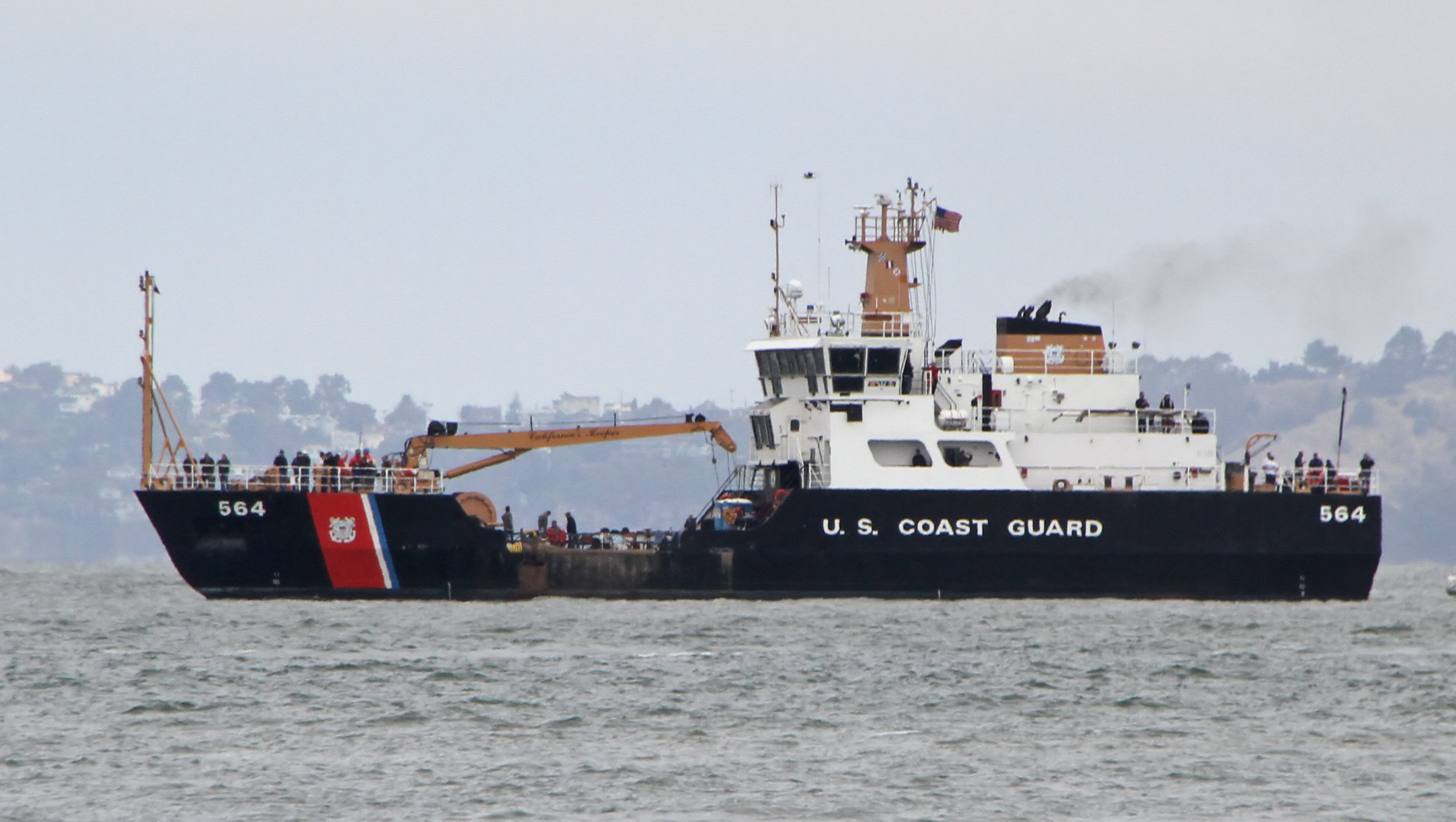
- USCGC George Cobb

History

United States
- Name: George Cobb
- Operator: US Coast Guard
- Builder: Marinette Marine Corporation
- Launched: 18 December 1999
- Commissioned: 27 October 2000
- Home port: San Pedro, California
- Identification: IMO number: 9177325; Call sign: NGEC; MMSI number: 338921000
- Status: Active
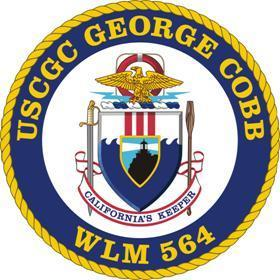
- Badge

General characteristics
- Type: Keeper-class buoy tender
- Displacement: 850 long tons (864 t) full load
- Length: 175 ft (53.3 m)
- Beam: 36 ft (11.0 m)
- Draft: 8 ft (2.4 m)
- Installed power: 2,000 hp (1,500 kW) sustained
- Propulsion: 2 × Caterpillar 3508 DITA Diesel engines; bow thruster, 500 hp (373 kW)
- Speed: 12 knots (22 km/h; 14 mph)
- Range: 2000 nautical miles at 10 kn
- Crew: 24 (2 Officers, 22 Enlisted)

USCGC George Cobb (WLM-564) is a Keeper-class coastal buoy tender of the United States Coast Guard. Launched in 1999, she is home-ported in San Pedro, California. Her primary mission is maintaining over 178 floating aids to navigation on the California coast from San Francisco to San Diego. Secondary missions include marine environmental protection, search and rescue, and security. She is assigned to the Eleventh Coast Guard District.

== Construction and characteristics ==
On 22 June 1993 the Coast Guard awarded the contract for the Keeper-class vessels to Marinette Marine Corporation in the form of a firm contract for the lead ship and options for thirteen more. The Coast Guard exercised options for the final four, including George Cobb, in September of 1997. The ship was launched on 18 December 1999 into the Menominee River. George Cobb is the last of the fourteen Keeper-class ships built.

Her hull was built of welded steel plates. She is 175 feet (53 m) long, with a beam of 36 feet (11 m), and a full-load draft of 8 feet (2.4 m). George Cobb displaces 850 long tons fully loaded. Her gross register tonnage is 904, and her net register tonnage is 271. The top of the mast is 58.75 feet (17.91 m) above the waterline.

Rather than building the ship from the keel up as a single unit, Marinette Marine used a modular fabrication approach. Eight large modules, or "hull blocks" were built separately and then welded together.

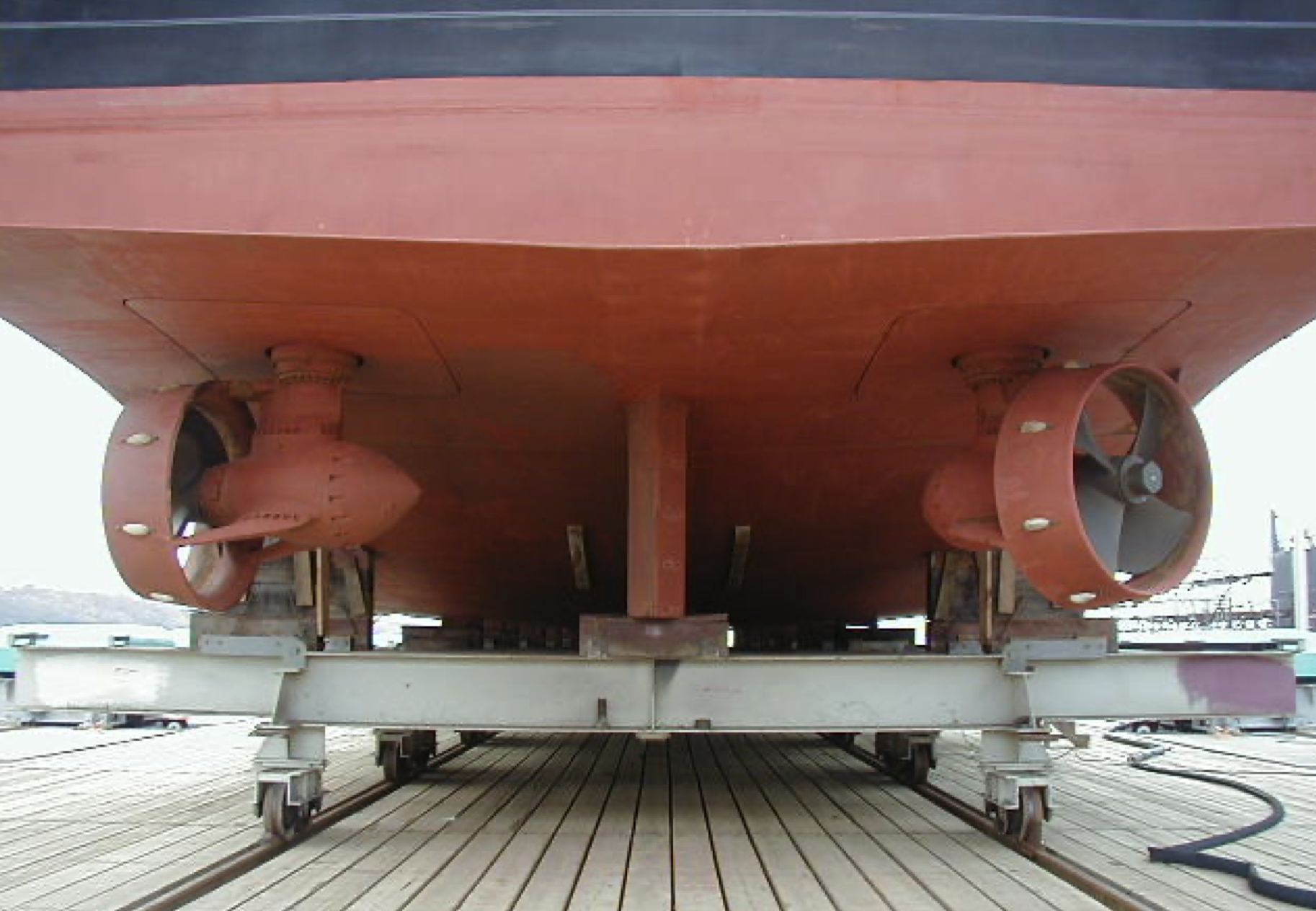
Z-drives on a Keeper-class ship

The ship has two Caterpillar 3508 DITA (direct-injection, turbocharged, aftercooled) 8-cylinder Diesel engines which produce 1000 horsepower each. These drive two Ulstein Z-drives. Keeper-class ships were the first Coast Guard cutters equipped with Z-drives, which markedly improved their maneuverability. The Z-drives have four-bladed propellers which are 57.1 inches (145 cm) in diameter and are equipped with Kort nozzles. They can be operated in "tiller mode" where the Z-drives turn in the same direction to steer the ship, or in "Z-conn mode" where the two Z-drives can turn in different directions to achieve specific maneuvering objectives. An implication of the Z-drives is that there is no reverse gear or rudder aboard George Cobb. In order to back the ship, the Z-drives are turned 180 degrees which drives the ship stern-first even though the propellers are spinning in the same direction as they do when the ship is moving forward. Her maximum speed is 12 knots. Her tanks can hold 16,385 gallons of diesel fuel which gives her an unrefueled range of 2,000 nautical miles at 10 knots.

She has a 500 horsepower bow thruster. The Z-drives and bow thruster can be linked in a Dynamic Positioning System. This gives George Cobb the ability to hold position in the water even in heavy currents, winds, and swells. This advanced capability is useful in bringing buoys aboard that can weigh more than 16,000 lbs.

Electrical power aboard is provided by three Caterpillar 3406 DITA generators which produce 285 Kw each. She also has a 210 Kw emergency generator, which is a Caterpillar 3406 DIT.

The buoy deck has 1,335 square feet (124.0 m^{2}) of working area. A crane with a boom 42 feet (13 m) long lifts buoys and their mooring anchors onto the deck. The crane can lift up to 20,000 pounds (9,100 kg).

The ships' fresh water tanks can hold 7,339 gallons. She has three ballast tanks that can be filled to maintain their trim, and tanks for oily waste water, sewage, gray water, new lubrication oil, and waste oil.

Accommodations were designed for mixed gender crews from the start. Crew size and composition has varied over the years. Her current complement is two officers and twenty-two enlisted personnel.

George Cobb, as all Keeper-class ships, has a strengthened "ice belt" along the waterline so that she can work on aids to navigation in ice-infested waters. Not only is the hull plating in the ice belt thicker than the rest of the hull, but framing members are closer together in areas that experience greater loads when working in ice. Higher grades of steel were used for hull plating in the ice belt to prevent cracking in cold temperatures. Her bow is sloped so that rather than smashing into ice, she rides up over it to break it with the weight of the ship. George Cobb is capable of breaking flat, 9-inch thick ice at 3 knots. Given her southern posting, the ship has not been used in an ice-breaking role.

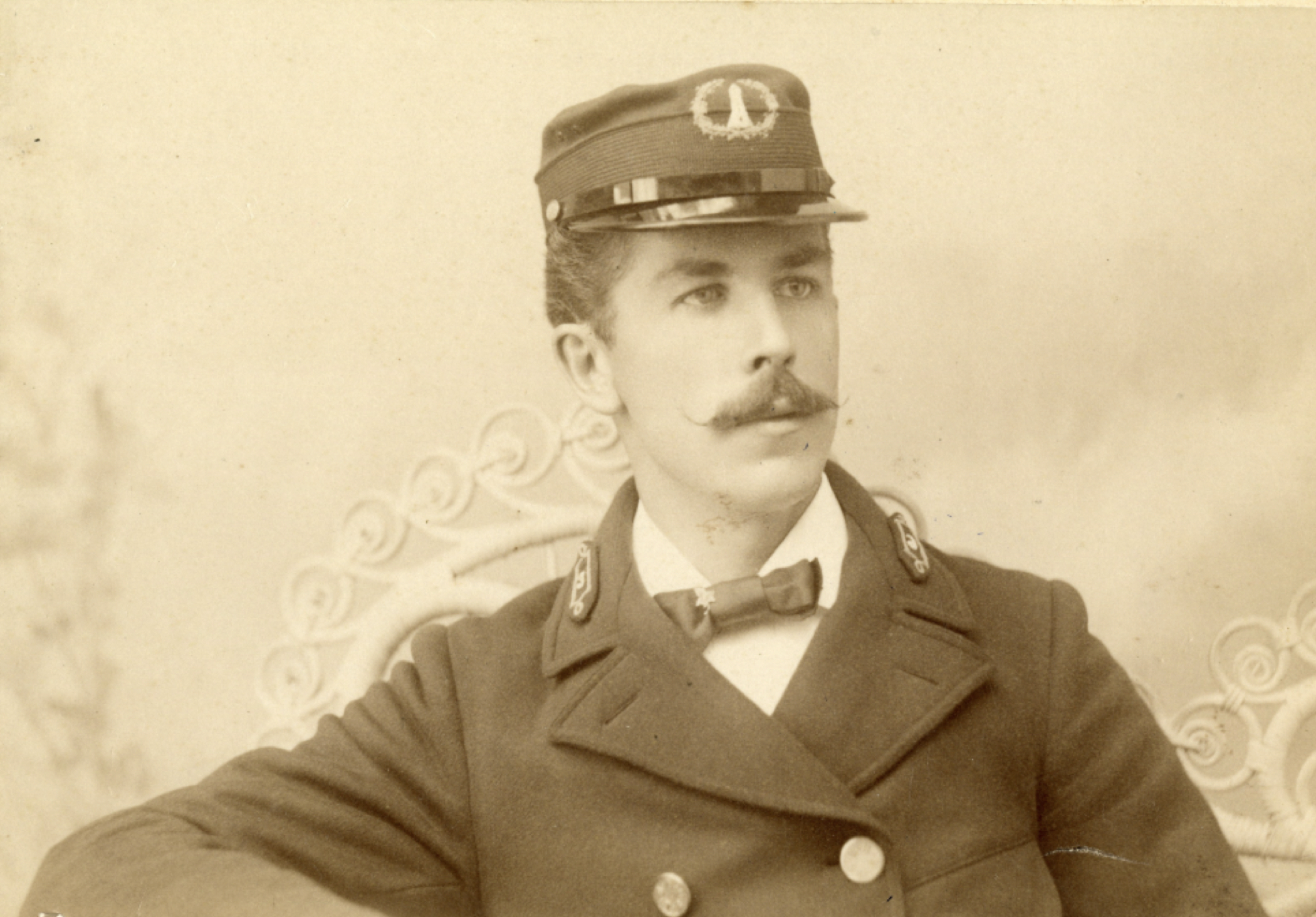
Lighthouse Keeper George Cobb

The ship carries a cutter boat on davits. She was originally equipped with a CB-M boat which was replaced in the mid-2010s with a CB-ATON-M boat. This was built by Metal Shark Aluminum Boats and was estimated to cost $210,000. The boat is 18 feet (5.5 m) long and are equipped with a Mercury Marine inboard/outboard diesel engine.

The ship's namesake is lighthouse keeper George Cobb. He had a long career tending a number of California lighthouses, but is best known for his service at the Oakland Harbor Light. In 1896 Cobb was an assistant keeper at the light. On 26 December 1896, a sailboat capsized in rain squalls near the light and Cobb rowed out and saved two men who clung to the keel. In 1903 he was awarded the silver lifesaving medal for his bravery.

George Cobb replaced USCGC Conifer, which was decommissioned in 2000.

== Operational history ==
The Coast Guard took ownership of George Cobb on 22 June 2000, and placed her "in commission, special" status. To reach her new home port in California, she sailed from Lake Michigan through the Great Lakes, out into the Atlantic, and through the Panama Canal. This voyage took 108 days to complete. She was placed in full commission at a ceremony in San Pedro on 27 October 2000.

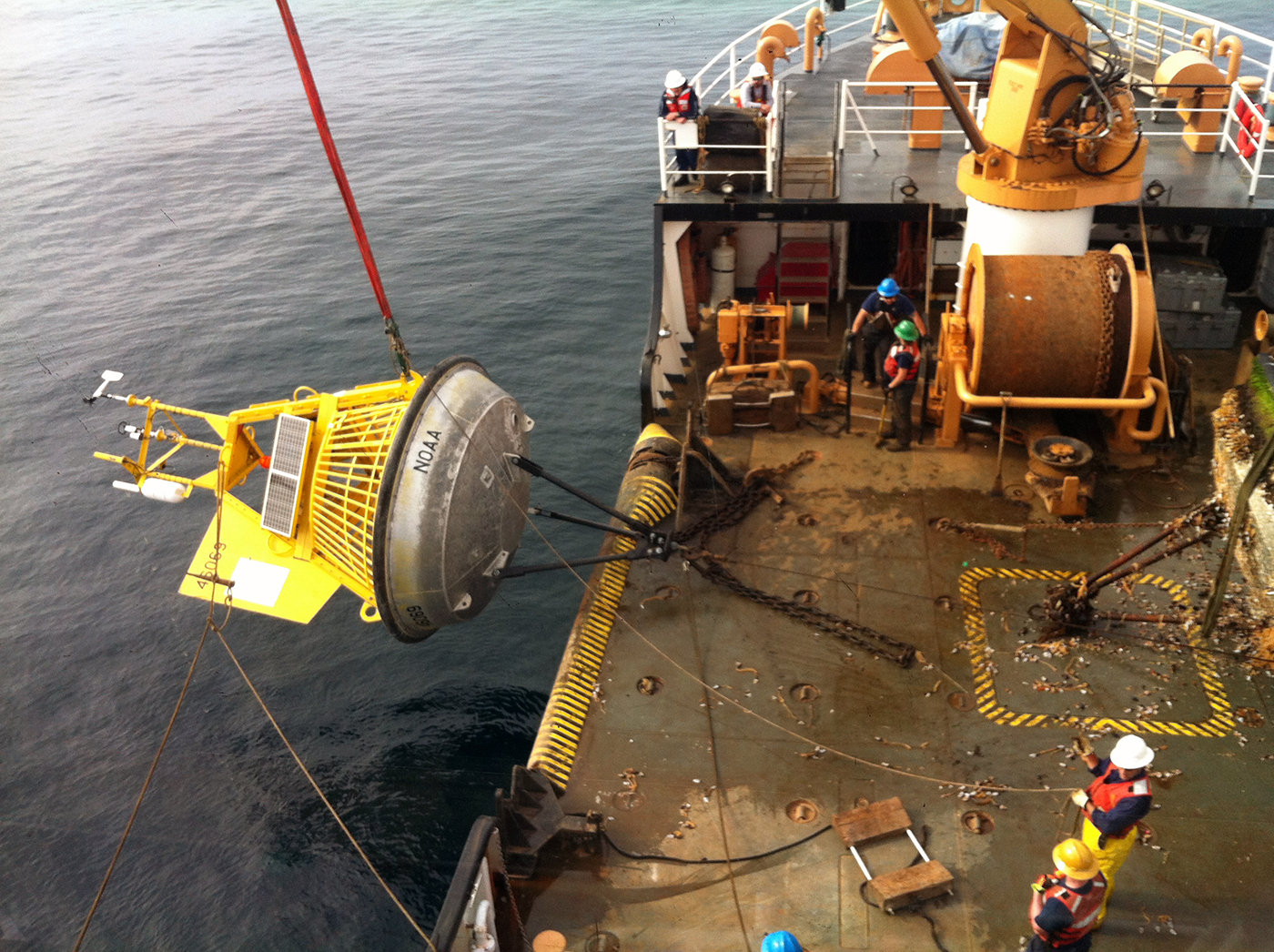
George Cobb hoisting a NOAA weather buoy

George Cobb's buoy tending involves lifting them onto her deck where marine growth is scraped and pressure washed off, inspecting the buoy itself, and replacing lights, solar cells, and radar transponders. The mooring chain or synthetic cable is inspected and replaced as needed. The concrete block mooring anchor is also inspected. In addition to maintaining aids to navigation, George Cobb has also been dispatched to maintain NOAA weather buoys.

The bulk of George Cobb's year is spent at sea tending its buoys, or in port maintaining the ship. She has been asked to perform other missions, as described below.

=== Search and rescue ===
Two light planes collided in mid-air near the Long Beach harbor breakwater in February 2001. George Cobb served as a dive platform for efforts to recover bodies and debris. During April 2006, she was sent to assist a 23-foot vessel that was disabled and adrift near the Long Beach breakwater. A Coast Guard C-130 Hercules collided in mid-air with a Marine Corps AH-1W Super Cobra helicopter near San Clemente Island on 29 October 2009. A number of Coast Guard and Marine units were sent to the crash site to search for survivors, including George Cobb. On 4 October 2011, the ship was dispatched to assist a 45-foot sailboat that had gone aground on Santa Cruz Island.

=== Security ===
Sixty members of FBI SWAT teams participated in boarding exercises aboard George Cobb in May 2007. The ship provided security zone enforcement for the 2010 San Francisco Fleet Week.

=== Marine Environment Protection ===
In December 2007, a sea lion weighing 1,100 pounds (500 kg) was embarked on George Cobb. The animal had been rehabilitated by the Pacific Marine Mammal Center and was released back into the wild near San Clemente Island. In September 2011, the ship deployed the Vessel of Opportunity Skimming System in an oil spill training exercise. The Woods Hole Oceanographic Institution developed an autonomous underwater vehicle to detect oil spills. In 2019 George Cobb launched the vehicle in the Santa Barbara Channel as part of a joint exercise between the Institution, NOAA, and The Environmental Protection Agency.

=== Public engagement ===
The Coast Guard has offered tours aboard George Cobb on several occasions. These include:

- At Green Bay, Wisconsin in June 2000
- San Francisco Fleet Week in 2007, and 2014.
- Seabee Days in Port Hueneme in 2001
- Morro Bay Harbor Festival in 2006
- Coast Guard Days at Cabrillo Beach in 2009
- In July 2009, George Cobb embarked 84 members of the Coast Guard Auxiliary for a tour and pleasure cruise to Santa Catalina Island.

In April 2008, George Cobb hosted a delegation from the Russian Border Guard, which had similar responsibilities to the US Coast Guard. In October 2011, the ship hosted 34 cadets from Oakland Military Institute for a one-day cruise.

== Awards and honors ==
George Cobb was awarded the Coast Guard Special Operations Service Ribbon for her participation in Operation Able Venture in 2006.
