= USCGC John McCormick =

Sentinel-class cutter of the United States Coast Guard

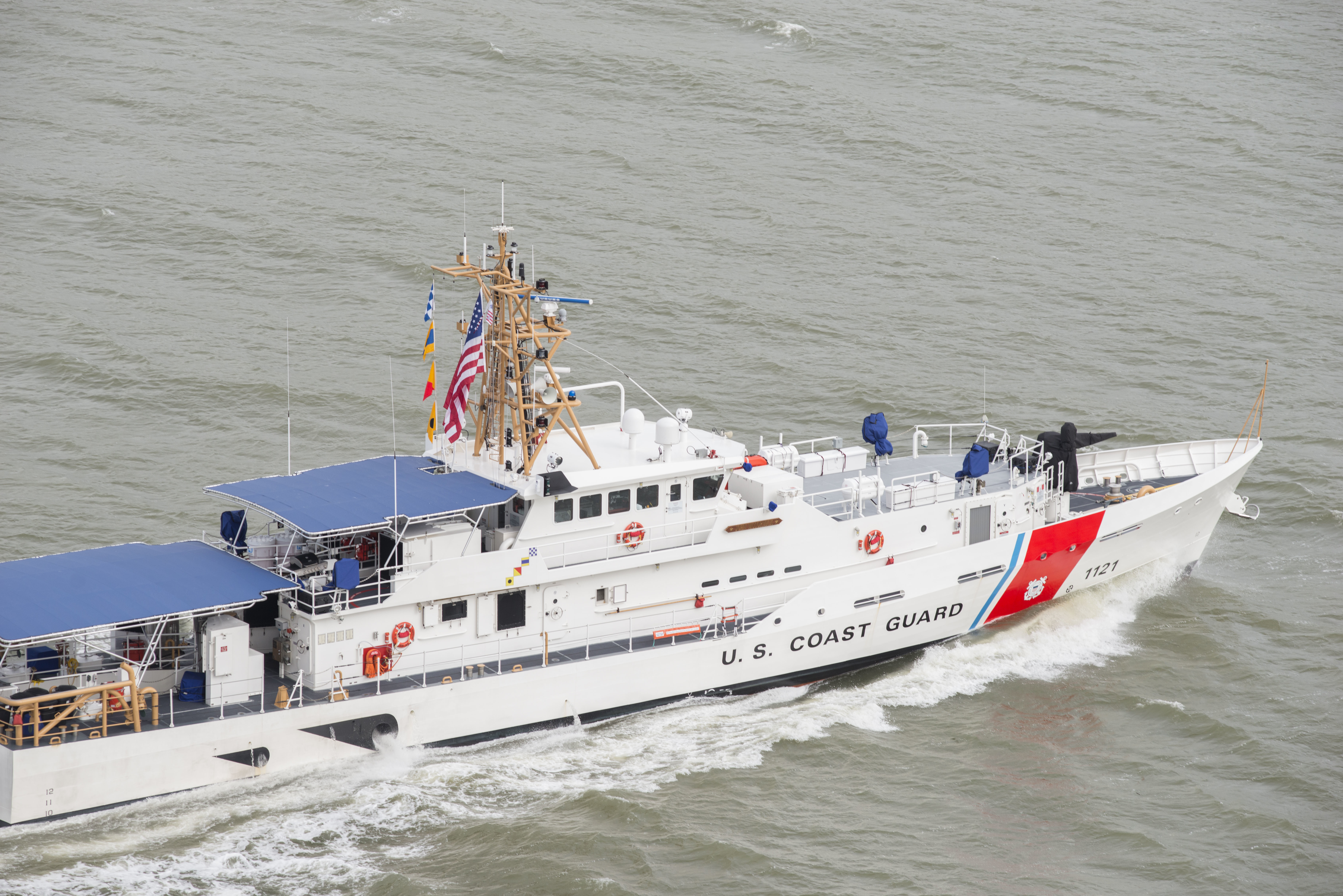
- USCGC John McCormick visits the Columbia River, on her way to her home port in Alaska.

History

United States
- Name: John McCormick
- Namesake: John F. McCormick
- Operator: United States Coast Guard
- Builder: Bollinger Shipyards, Lockport, Louisiana
- Launched: December 13, 2016
- Acquired: December 13, 2016
- Commissioned: April 12, 2017
- Home port: Ketchikan, Alaska
- Identification: MMSI number: 338926421; Callsign: NDOI; Hull number: WPC-1121
- Motto: Stewards of the last frontier
- Status: in active service
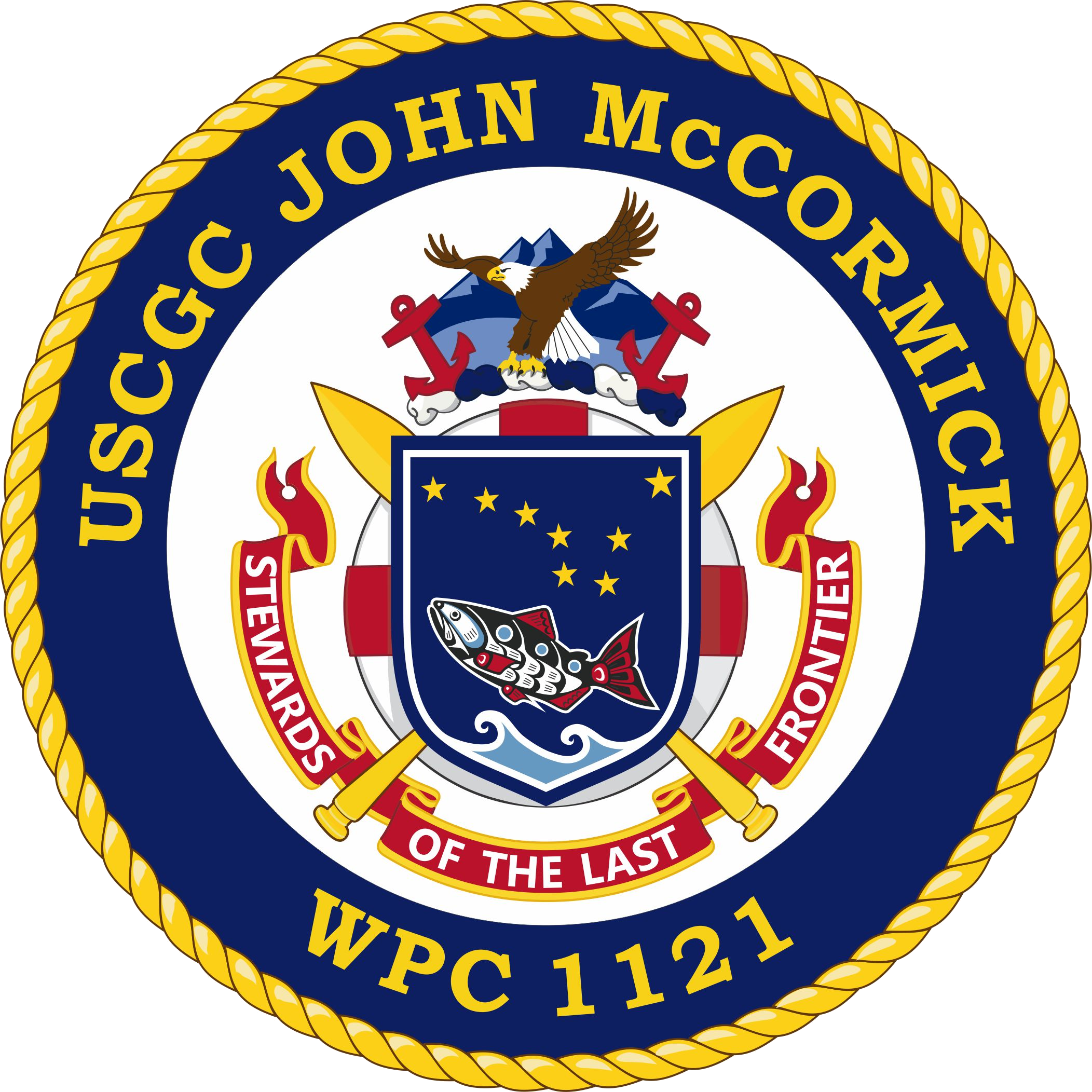
- Badge

General characteristics
- Class & type: Sentinel-class cutter
- Displacement: 353 long tons (359 t)
- Length: 46.8 m (154 ft)
- Beam: 8.11 m (26.6 ft)
- Depth: 2.9 m (9.5 ft)
- Propulsion: 2 × 4,300 kW (5,800 shp); 1 × 75 kW (101 shp) bow thruster
- Speed: 28 knots (52 km/h; 32 mph)
- Range: 2,500 nautical miles (4,600 km; 2,900 mi)
- Endurance: 5 days
- Boats & landing craft carried: 1 × Short Range Prosecutor RHIB
- Complement: 2 officers, 20 crew
- Sensors & processing systems: L-3 C4ISR suite
- Armament: 1 × Mk 38 Mod 2 25 mm automatic gun; 4 × crew-served Browning M2 machine guns

USCGC John McCormick (WPC-1121) is the United States Coast Guard's 21st Sentinel-class cutter, and the first to be stationed in Alaska, where she is homeported at Coast Guard Base Ketchikan.

The vessel's manufacturer, Bollinger Shipyards, of Lockport, Louisiana, delivered the ship to the Coast Guard on December 13, 2016, for her acceptance trials, and then John McCormick was commissioned on April 12, 2017 in Ketchikan, Alaska.

== Mission ==
The Sentinel-class cutters are lightly armed patrol vessels with a crew of approximately two dozen sailors, capable of traveling almost 3,000 nautical miles, on five day missions. The cutter is a multi-mission vessel intended to perform law enforcement, search and rescue, fisheries and environmental protection, and homeland security tasks. Houma Today quoted Ben Bordelon, Bollinger's CEO, that John McCormick will ""assist in defending our nation's interests in the Alaskan maritime region.""

== Operational history ==
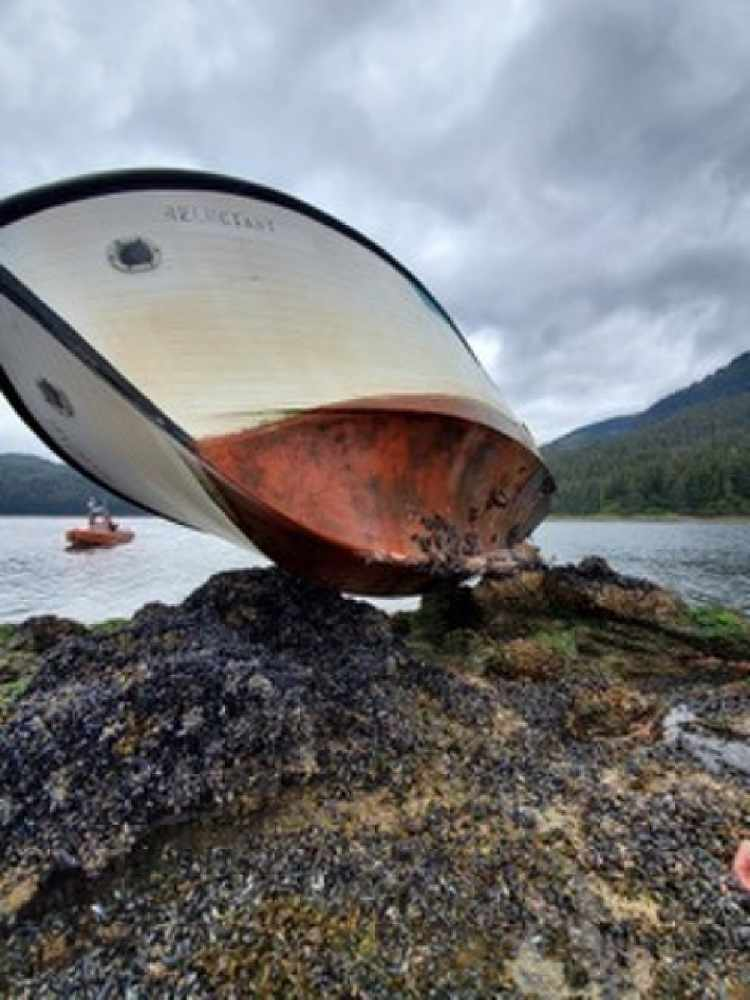
The John McCormick rescued the crew of the stranded fishing vessel Reluctant (pictured) on September 23, 2020.

On March 12, 2017, John McCormick stopped in Astoria, Oregon, on its way to its commissioning in Ketchikan. The Coast Guard invited Astoria residents to tour the vessel. The Daily Astorian reported that the Coast Guard was considering stationing two Sentinel-class cutters in either Astoria or Newport, Oregon.

The vessel arrived in Ketchikan, Alaska on March 17, 2017. The Ketchikan fireboat and smaller Coast Guard vessels escorted her to her moorings. She was commissioned on April 12, 2017. Five other Sentinel-class cutters will be based in Alaska, including the USCGC Bailey T. Barco in Ketchikan.

Admiral Charles D. Michel, the Coast Guard's Vice Commandant, attended the vessel's commissioning ceremony on April 12, 2017. He published an op-ed in the Juneau Empire celebrating the improvements the cutter offered over earlier models. He explained how important the cutter, the five sister ships that will join her patrolling Alaska's water, will be for the Alaskan economy.

On September 23, 2020, the John McCormick proceeded to Hoonah, Alaska, on a rescue mission. Her crew rescued the crew of a fishing vessel that was stranded on rocks there, and were able to tow the vessel back to port.

== Namesake ==
John F. McCormick was the Coast Guard petty officer commanding the motor lifeboat Triumph on March 26, 1938. The Triumph was assisting the tugboat Tyee and its barge off Clatsop Spit, near the Columbia River bar, when Surfman Richard O. Bracken, one of McCormick's three-man crew, was washed overboard. McCormick skilfully maneuvered the Triumph under very dangerous conditions to retrieve Bracken from the breakers. McCormick was awarded a Gold Lifesaving Medal, and his two assisting crewmen were awarded Silver Lifesaving Medals, for this rescue. McCormick retired from the Coast Guard in 1947 as a lieutenant after a 26-year career.

In 2010, Charles "Skip" W. Bowen, who was then the United States Coast Guard's most senior non-commissioned officer, proposed that the cutters in the Sentinel class should be named after enlisted sailors in the Coast Guard, or one of its precursor services, who were recognized for their heroism. In 2014 the Coast Guard announced that McCormick would be the namesake of the 21st cutter.

== Accolades ==
The crew of John McCormick was awarded the 2017 "Hopley Yeaton Cutter Excellence Award (small cutter)" by the Douglas Munro Chapter of the Surface Navy Association. The award was presented on January 11, 2018 at the 2018 Surface Navy Association National Symposium in Washington, D.C. The "small cutter" category of the award includes those with a length of 175 feet or less; over 150 such cutters were considered for the 2017 award. The Hopley Yeaton Cutter Excellence Award recognizes crew performance in areas such as the crew's accomplishment of operations and of missions, their training and readiness, their engineering prowess, and their commitment to the crew and to their families.

The award citation noted the crew's high level of readiness and training, which allowed it to quickly deal with engineering and damage control problems which had appeared during McCormick's long voyage the previous year from Key West to her Ketchikan homeport. Also noted were the crew's immediate and effective integration into the Ketchikan community and into the Coast Guard's Alaskan operations: during 2017, McCormick's crew conducted 77 fisheries boardings and rescued or helped to rescue ten people and more than US$1 million in property.
