= Bailey T. Barco =

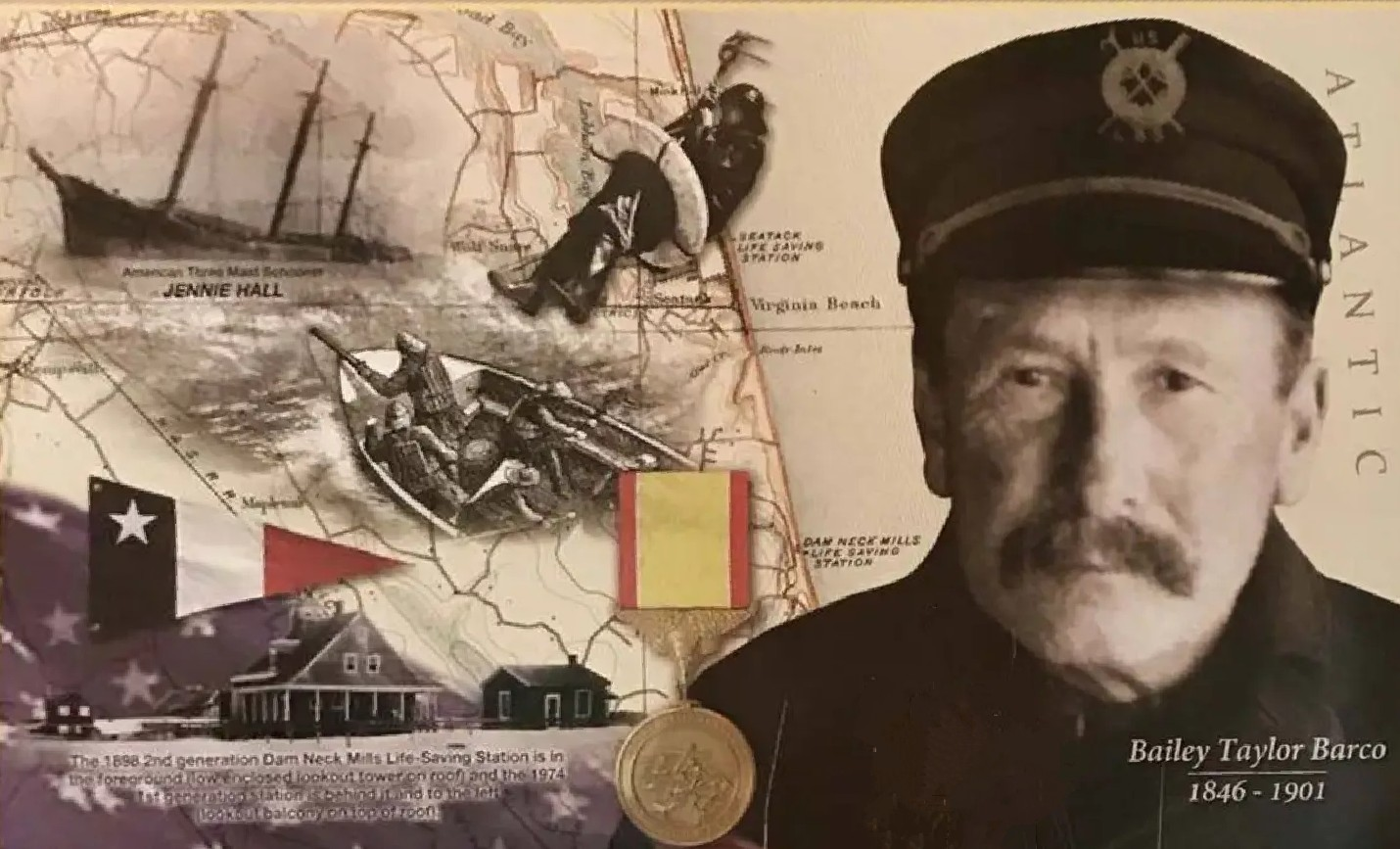
Collage in honor of Captain Bailey Barco

Bailey Taylor Barco (February 14, 1846 - November 4, 1901) was a stationkeeper and Captain with the United States Life-Saving Service—one of the agencies later merged into the United States Coast Guard. He led a rescue at his station Dam Neck Mills in present-day Virginia Beach, on December 21, 1900.

A severe storm had grounded the schooner Jennie Hall, which was being beaten to pieces on its sandbank. Barco decided the surf was too severe to launch his station's surfboat. But his crew was able to send a line to the vessel, and bring off most of the surviving crew with a breeches-buoy.

The last surviving crew member was too numb with cold, and required assistance. Attempts to carry a rescuer out to the schooner with the breeches-buoy were unsuccessful, so Barco and one of his crew made several attempts to use the surfboat to reach the stranded man. They finally succeeded, and were able to put two rescuers aboard the vessel, who were able to assist the last man to mount the breeches-buoy.

Barco was awarded the Gold Lifesaving Medal on October 7, 1901.

Barco was a fisherman, machinist, boat builder, and wrecker by trade. With his wife, Virginia Williams Barco, he had nine children, seven of whom survived; many of their descendants continue to live in the Virginia Beach area. Barco oversaw construction of the chapel by the Sea in Dam Neck, a daughter church of the Eastern Shore Chapel where he is buried.

== Legacy ==
In 2010, Master Chief Petty Officer of the Coast Guard Charles "Skip" W. Bowen, the United States Coast Guard's senior enlisted person at the time, lobbied for its new Sentinel-class cutters to be named after enlisted Coast Guardsmen, or personnel from its precursor services, who had distinguished themselves by their heroism. The USCGC Bailey Barco was the 22nd cutter to be launched.
