= John F. McCormick =

20th century US Coast Guard

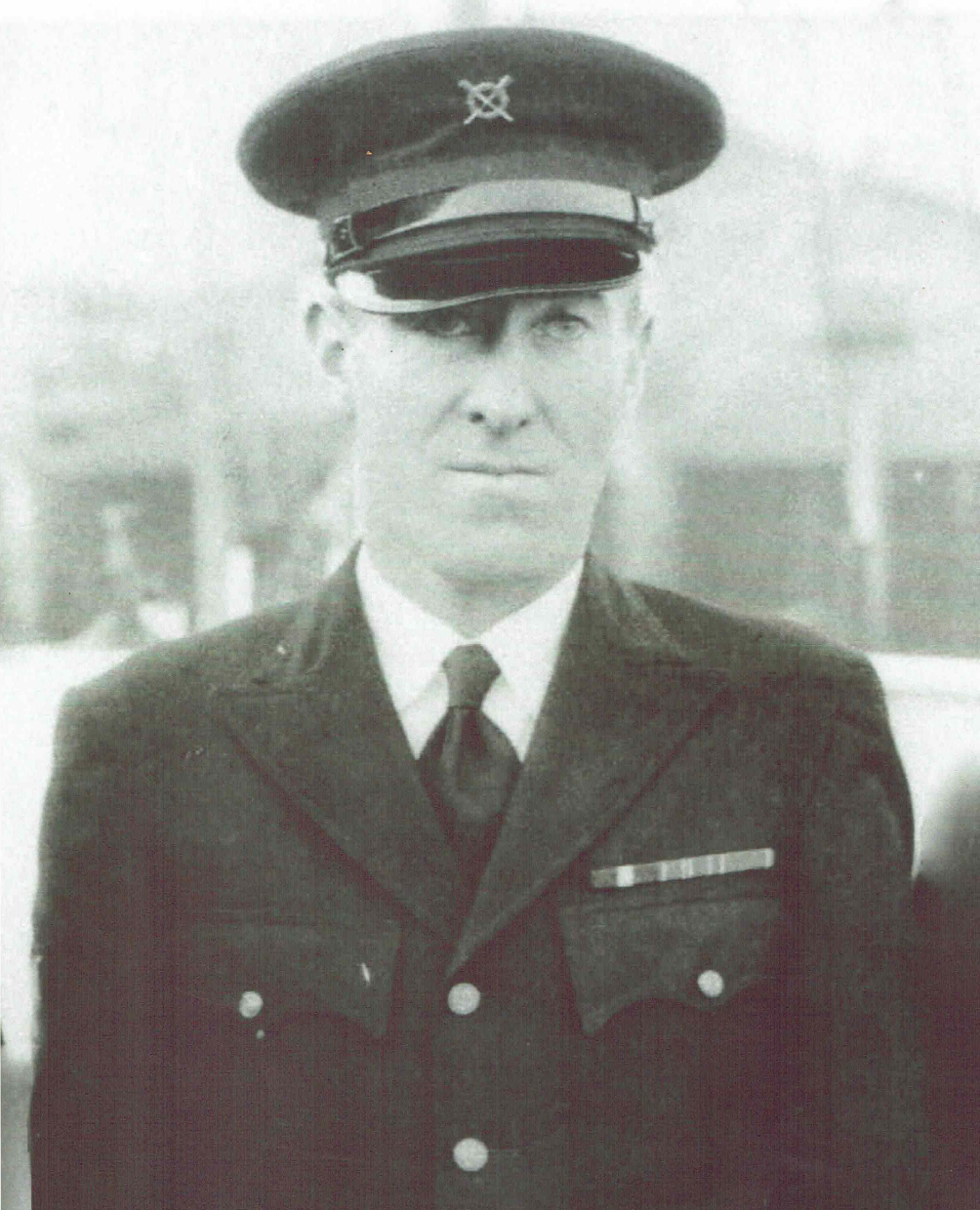
- Born: May 12, 1901; Portland, Oregon
- Died: April 2, 1986 (aged 84); Garibaldi, Oregon
- Occupation: sailor
- Known for: his heroism was recognized by naming a USCG cutter after him

John F. McCormick was a sailor in the United States Coast Guard who was recognized for his courage. McCormick was born in Portland, Oregon, and served much of his 26 year Coast Guard career in Oregon. After his 1947 retirement, he made his home in Garibaldi, Oregon; he lived there for another 39 years.

== Coast Guard career ==
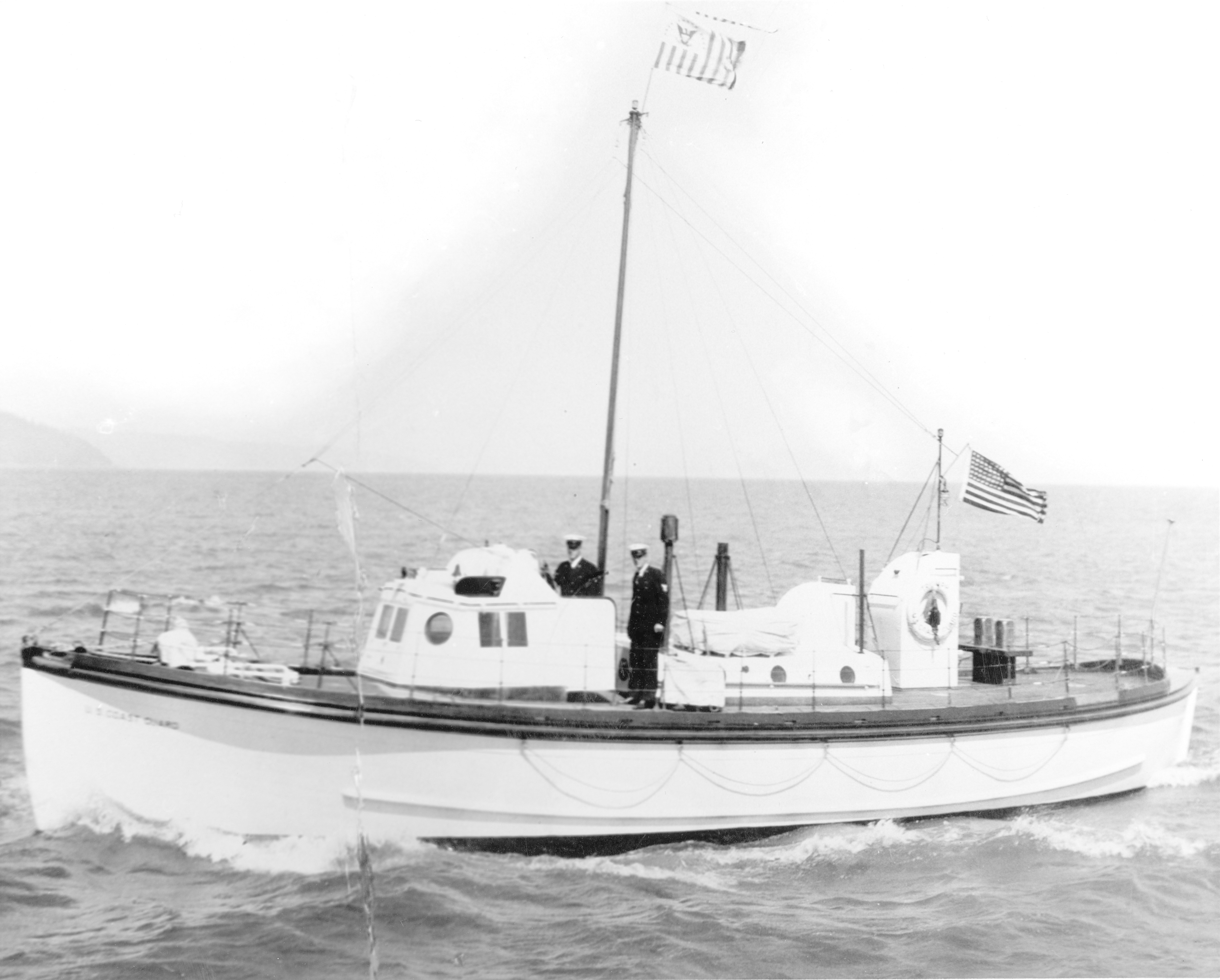
The skill and daring McCormick showed while rescuing a fellow crewmember, when in command of the USCGC Triumph, earned him the admiration of his peers.

McCormick enlisted in 1921, and spent most of his career as a non-commissioned petty officer. Late in his career he was promoted to the ranks of commissioned officers, and retired as a Lieutenant, in 1947.

In 1938 McCormick was the coxswain in charge of the motor lifeboat USCGC Triumph, at Point Adams Station, at the mouth of the Columbia River. Large rivers, like the Columbia, have dangerous sandbars, where the fast-flowing fresh-water, full of silt, slows where it meets ocean water. In bad weather waves break on the sandbar, representing a serious navigational danger.

On March 26, 1938 McCormick took the Triumph to assist a tug trying to tow logs across the bar. One of McCormick's crew fell overboard, and McCormick, exercising great skill, was able to lead his remaining crew in a rescue that won the admiration of his peers. The rescue earned McCormick the Congressional Gold Lifesaving Medal.

During World War II McCormick commanded Point Adams Station. In 1947 he commanded Coast Guard Station Garibaldi.

== Legacy ==
McCormick received the Coast Guard Gold Lifesaving medal.

In 2010, Charles "Skip" W. Bowen, who was then the Coast Guard's most senior non-commissioned officer, proposed that all 58 cutters in the Sentinel class should be named after enlisted sailors in the Coast Guard, or one of its precursor services, who were recognized for their heroism. In 2014, the Coast Guard announced that the 21st cutter would be named the John F. McCormick although in the event the middle initial was dropped from the ship's name. USCGC John McCormick was built in Lockport, Louisiana, at the Bollinger shipyards, and delivered to the Coast Guard on December 13, 2017. She was commissioned in Ketchikan, Alaska, the first cutter of her class to transit the Panama Canal, and the first to be commissioned on the west coast.
