= George Cobb (lighthouse keeper) =

American lighthouse keeper

George Douglas Cobb
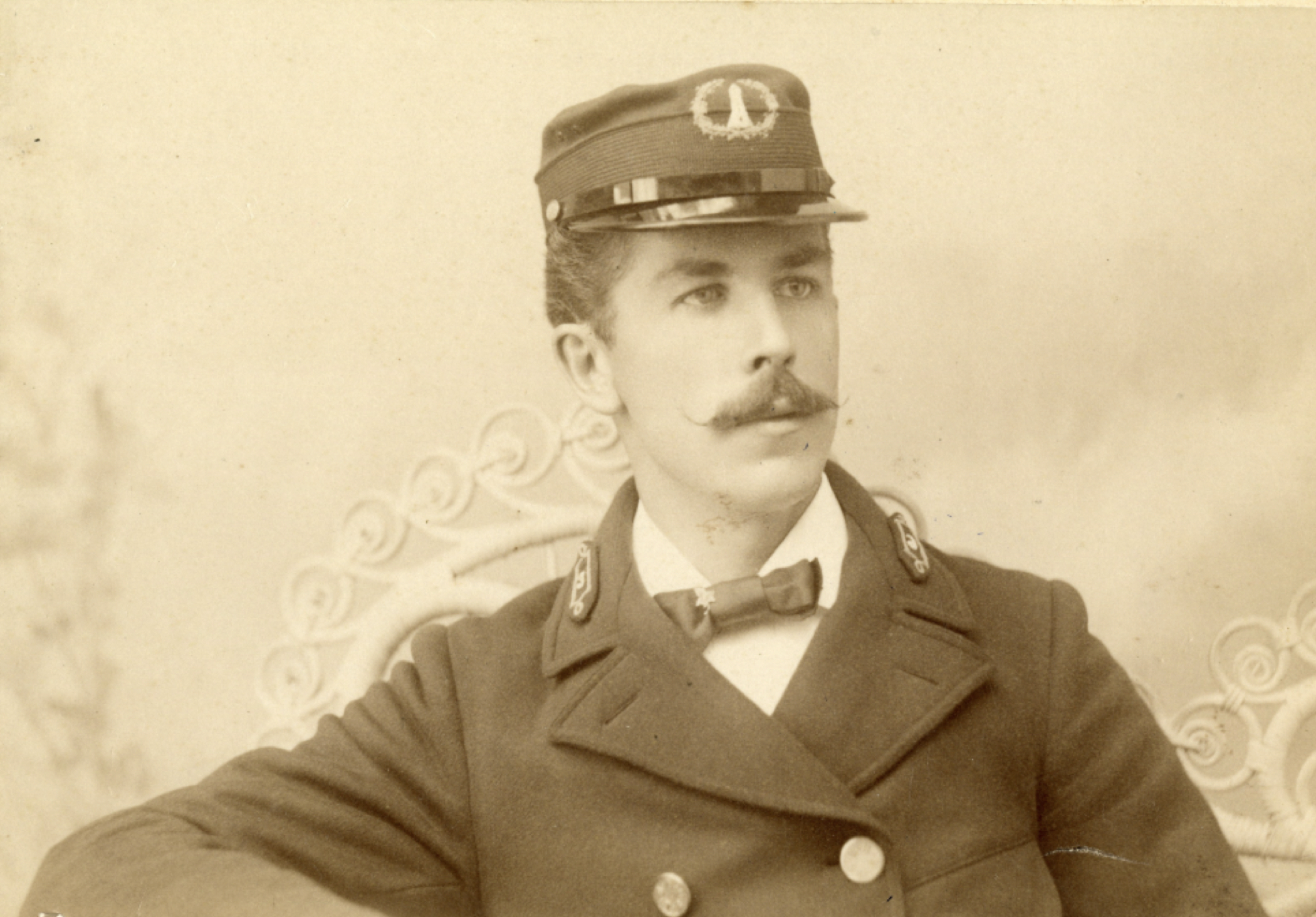
- Born: March 6, 1872; Plumstead, Kent, England
- Died: December 14, 1940 (aged 68); Visalia, California
- Occupation: Lighthouse Keeper
- Spouse: Theodora Cobb
- Children: George, William, Roy, Doris
- Parent(s): Henry and Emma Cobb

George Douglas Cobb (1872–1940) was a lighthouse keeper along the California coast for 43 years between 1890 and his retirement in 1938. At the time of his death he had served as a lighthouse keeper longer than anyone in the United States. He is best known for saving the lives of two men whose sailboat had capsized near the Oakland Harbor Lighthouse in 1896. He was awarded the silver lifesaving medal for his bravery in this rescue. The United States Coast Guard coastal buoy tender George Cobb (WLM-564), based in San Pedro, California, is named for him.

== Lighthouse keeper career ==
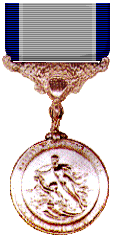
Silver lifesaving medal

Cobb began his service as a lighthouse keeper with the United States Lighthouse Board, a unit of the Treasury Department, which was responsible for all lighthouses in the United States. The Lighthouse Board was dissolved in 1910 and its responsibilities, lighthouses and staff, including Cobb, were assigned to the United States Lighthouse Service, a unit of the Commerce Department.

George Cobb's lighthouse keeper career
| Facility | Position | Start | Stop |
|---|---|---|---|
| Oakland Harbor Light | 1st Assistant Lighthouse Keeper | 1890 | 1891 |
| Oakland Harbor Light | 1st Assistant Lighthouse Keeper | 1896 | 1899 |
| Fort Point Light | 1st Assistant Lighthouse Keeper | 1899 | 1900 |
| Point Bonita Lighthouse | 2nd Assistant Lighthouse Keeper | 1900 | 1901 |
| Point Bonita Lighthouse | 1st Assistant Lighthouse Keeper | 1901 | 1904 |
| Fort Point Light | 1st Assistant Lighthouse Keeper | 1904 | 1908 |
| Humboldt Bay Fog Station | Principal Lighthouse Keeper | 1908 | 1919 |
| Fort Point Light | Principal Lighthouse Keeper | 1919 | 1934 |
| Point Arena Light | Principal Lighthouse Keeper | 1934 | 1935 |
| Point Loma Light | Principal Lighthouse Keeper | 1935 | 1938 |

=== 1896 Rescue ===
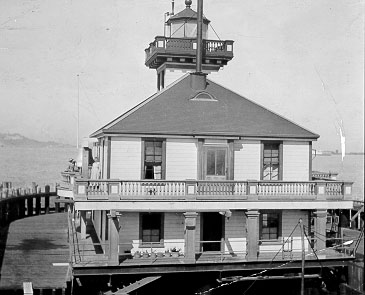
Oakland Harbor Light from which Cobb rowed during the 1896 rescue

Rain squalls and winds gusting to 50 knots were present in Oakland Harbor on December 26, 1896. A sailboat with three men aboard capsized near the Oakland Harbor Lighthouse, where Cobb was stationed. Cobb launched a boat and rowed out to the overturned sailboat, where two men clung to the keel. He was able to get Frank Whipple into his rowboat, but John J. Kennedy had fallen into the water. Cobb dove in and swam with Kennedy back to his rowboat and then took the pair ashore. The third man on the capsized boat, William Burke, used an oar as a floatation device and managed to swim ashore. On February 28, 1903, Cobb was awarded the silver lifesaving medal for his bravery.

=== Alameda wreck ===
On September 30, 1905, the steamer Alameda went aground in a thick fog on the rocks off Fort Point, where Cobb was stationed. The harbor pilot claimed that no fog whistles were blown by the Fort Point or Lime Point stations, and that this contributed to the accident. Cobb was called to testify before the United States Steamboat Inspection Service and asserted that his fog whistle was indeed blowing before the Alameda went aground.

=== USS H3 Rescue ===
On December 16, 1916, the submarine USS H3 went aground in a heavy fog while attempting to enter Humboldt Bay. Heavy surf pushed the ship up onto the beach, but also made it dangerous for anyone on board to enter the water to reach shore. George Cobb, stationed at the time at the Humboldt Bay fog signal station, was part of a team which rigged a breeches buoy to rescue 26 men on the stranded ship.

== Personal life ==
George Cobb was born at Plumstead, Kent, England on March 6, 1872. His parents were Thomas Henry Cobb and Emma Lydia Cobb, nee Kedge. U.S. census records report him emigrating to the United States in both 1884 and 1889. Since neither his father or mother moved to the United States, the later date, when George was 17 years old, seems more likely. George Cobb was married to Anna Christine Theodora Jensen on June 6, 1897, in San Francisco. They had four children, George Foster Herbert Cobb, William Raymond Cobb, Roy Douglas Cobb, and Doris Georgeanna Cobb.

Cobb died on December 14, 1940, at his home in Visalia, California. He is buried at the Woodlawn Cemetery in San Francisco.
