= William Babb =

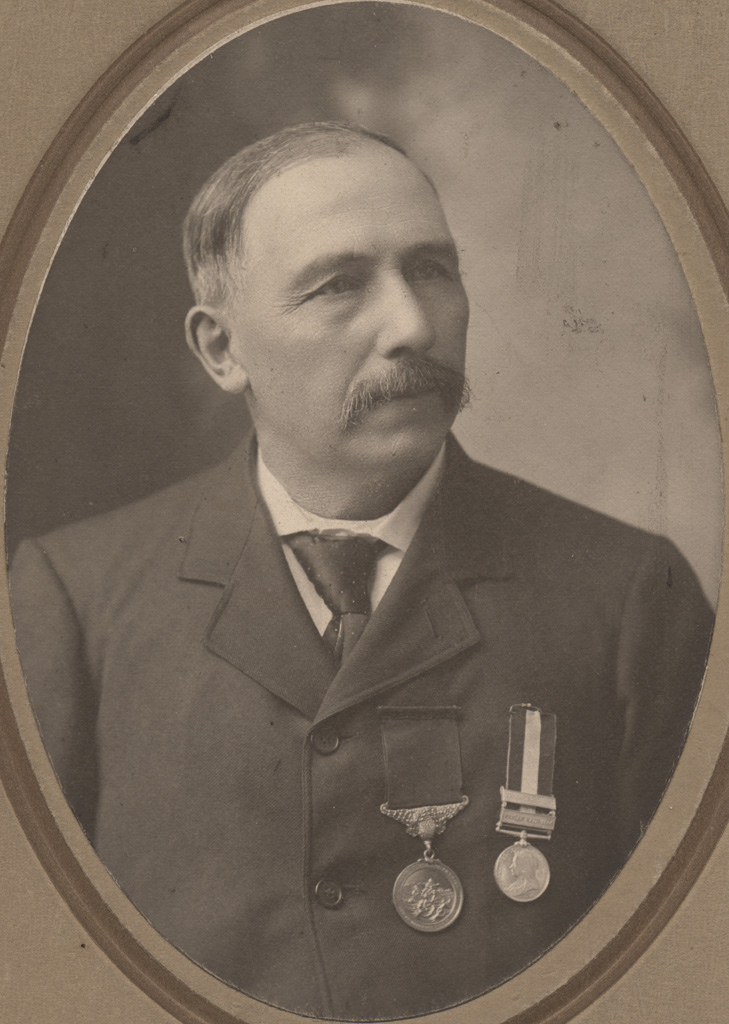
Portrait of Captain William Babb, date unknown but prior to 1937.

William Babb was a Canadian captain of the Goderich, Ontario Lifeboat Station's Life-Saving Brigade and local hotel proprietor. He was awarded a Gold Lifesaving Medal for the 1885 rescue of the American schooner A.C. Maxwell.

== Description of the Rescue ==
Captain William Babb earned a Gold Lifesaving Medal on February 11, 1888 for the rescue of six men and a woman from the schooner A. C. Maxwell that had wrecked on the shoals two miles south of Goderich in late 1885.

A description of the rescue from the Annual Report of the Operations of the United States Life-saving Service, published in 1889:

"The first case was the award made to the volunteer crew of life savers at Goderich Ontario who rescued six men and a woman from the stranded schooner A C Maxwell of Cleveland, Ohio, at day break on December 9, 1885. This vessel while on a voyage home from Marquette, Michigan in tow of a steamer broke adrift and was buffeted helplessly about on Lake Huron during a furious storm lasting five days. Her sails were blown to shreds, the rudder, anchors, and only boat lost, and in a sinking condition she was driven on the shoals several miles south of Goderich. Those on the ill-fated vessel were exhausted and half frozen, with apparently no prospect of ever getting to a place of safety. Fortunately, they kept the ship's bell ringing, which, at an early hour in the morning, attracted the attention of William Babb, captain of the Goderich life-boat, who hurried down to the beach, and, although not able to make out the situation in the darkness, instantly recognized the signal as one of distress The wind was still blowing a gale from the southwest with a heavy sea, thick with floating ice, running along shore. Captain Babb, notwithstanding the almost hopeless prospect of reaching the craft and the imminent danger which confronted the undertaking, quickly mustered a crew of volunteers and launched the life-boat. He had forewarned each man of the great peril he was about to face, but the sturdy group of fishermen were undaunted, and, with unflinching heroism, put forth through the angry breakers on their errand of mercy. Then followed a terrible struggle against wind, wave, and drift ice before they gained the vessel. Less determined and stout-hearted men would have given up long before the four miles of storm tossed waters had been conquered, but the lofty spirit that animated them was far greater than the thought of personal danger, and they steadfastly kept at their oars until the rescue was an accomplished fact. It was with great difficulty that the suffering crew were taken from the schooner and conveyed in safety to the shore. They were then kindly cared for, and when their condition warranted, were sent to their homes. Unquestionably every soul would have perished had it not been for the supreme and gallant efforts of the life-boat men. In recognition of their heroic action on this occasion, a gold medal was awarded to Captain Babb and silver medals to the other participants, namely: Thomas Finn, Daniel McIver, Malcolm McDonald, Neil McIver, John McLean and John McDonald. The presentation of these awards was subsequently made by the United States consul in the town hall of Goderich, before a large and enthusiastic gathering of citizens."

== Other Activities ==
Captain Babb also operated the Ocean House Hotel during the mid-1880s in Lowertown at the Goderich Harbour. The Hotel was located next to an artesian mineral spring touted for its healing qualities.

== Biography ==
Captain Babb is buried in the Maitland Cemetery just outside Goderich.
