= Coast Guard Base Ketchikan =

US Coast Guard base in Ketchikan, Alaska

Coordinates: 55.3326°N 131.6246°W

Base Ketchikan
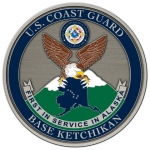
- Active: 1940-present
- Country: United States
- Branch: United States Coast Guard
- Type: Base
- Role: Search and rescue, maritime patrol, law enforcement, homeland security, maintenance
- Motto: First in service in Alaska

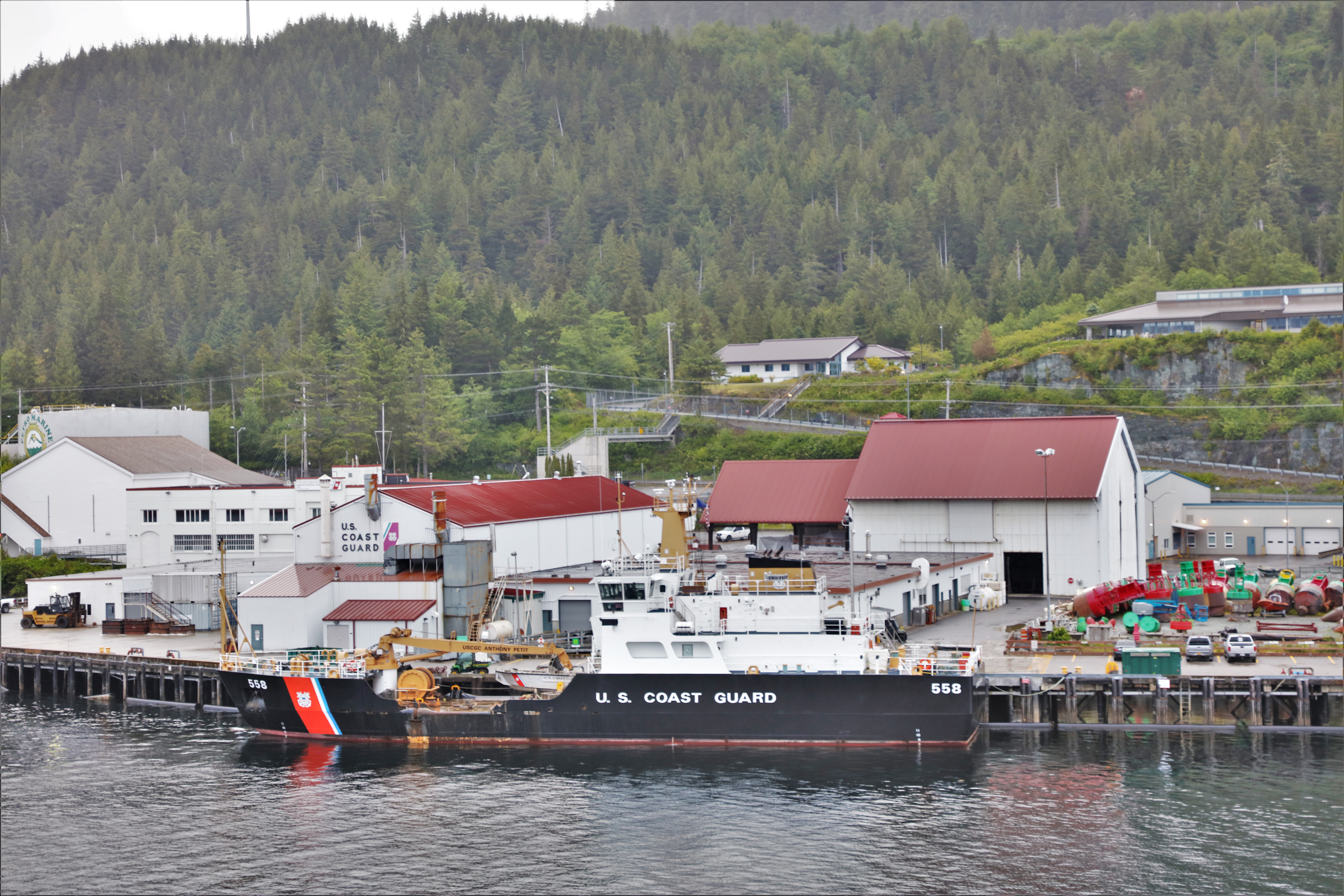
View of the base from a cruise ship in May 2016.

Coast Guard Base Ketchikan is a major shore installation of the United States Coast Guard located in Ketchikan, Alaska. The base is a homeport for three Sentinel-class cutters and a buoy tender, and is the only Coast Guard dry dock in the state. Located one mile south of the city's downtown area along the southwestern shore of Revillagigedo Island, the base was originally established in 1920 to support the United States Lighthouse Service and became part of the Coast Guard in 1940. In addition to the homeported cutters, Base Ketchikan's maintenance facilities support forward-deployed cutters throughout Southeast Alaska, in Petersburg, Juneau and Sitka.

== Coast Guard Station Ketchikan ==
Coast Guard Station Ketchikan is a tenant unit on Coast Guard Base Ketchikan, equipped with 47-foot motor lifeboats and the Response Boat-Medium. It is one of three Coast Guard small-boat stations in Alaska.

== Homeported cutters ==
- USCGC Bailey T. Barco - Sentinel-class cutter
- USCGC John McCormick - Sentinel-class cutter
- USCGC Anthony Petit (WLM-558) - Keeper-class buoy tender
