= USCGC Bailey Barco =

USCG's 22nd cutter and the 2nd to be stationed in Alaska

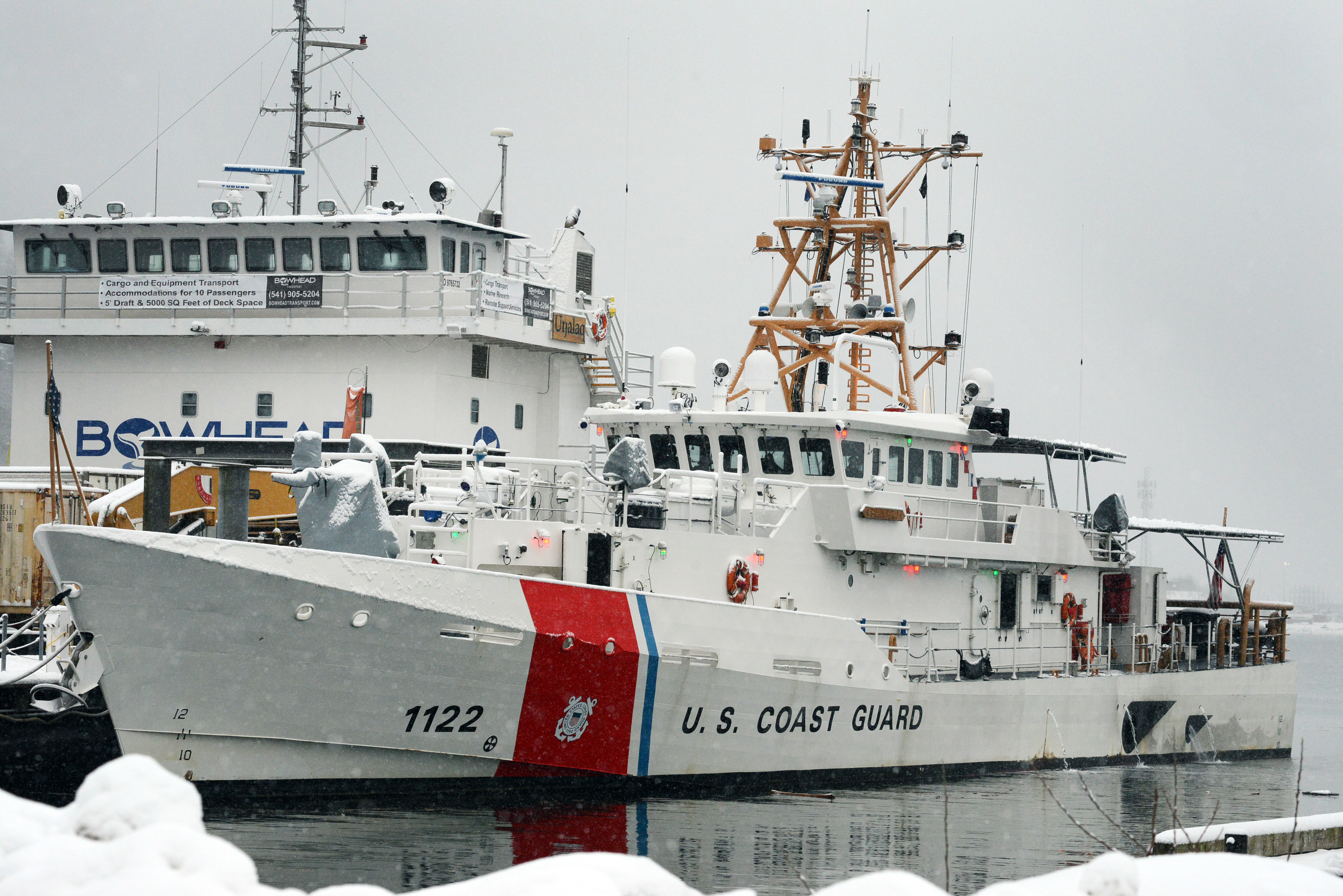
- USCGC Bailey Barco in 2020

History

United States
- Name: Bailey Barco
- Namesake: Bailey T. Barco
- Operator: United States Coast Guard
- Builder: Bollinger Shipyards, Lockport, Louisiana
- Launched: February 7, 2017
- Acquired: February 7, 2017
- Commissioned: June 14, 2017
- Home port: Ketchikan, Alaska
- Identification: MMSI number: 338926422; Callsign: NBAB; Hull number: WPC-1122
- Motto: Initiative courage fortitude
- Status: in active service
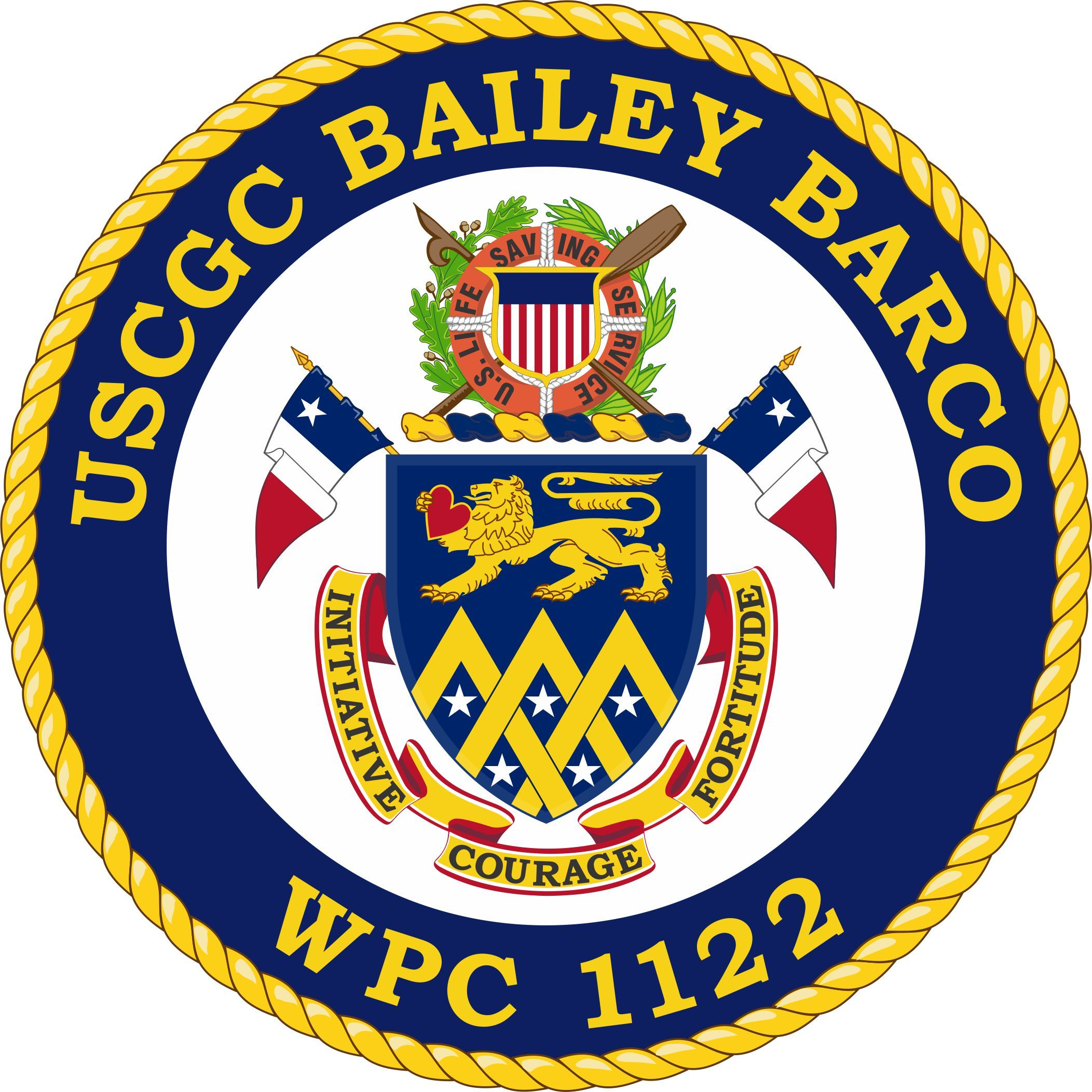
- Badge

General characteristics
- Class & type: Sentinel-class cutter
- Displacement: 353 long tons (359 t)
- Length: 46.8 m (154 ft)
- Beam: 8.11 m (26.6 ft)
- Depth: 2.9 m (9.5 ft)
- Propulsion: 2 × 4,300 kW (5,800 shp); 1 × 75 kW (101 shp) bow thruster
- Speed: 28 knots (52 km/h; 32 mph)
- Range: 2,500 nautical miles (4,600 km; 2,900 mi)
- Endurance: 5 days
- Boats & landing craft carried: 1 × Short Range Prosecutor RHIB
- Complement: 2 officers, 20 crew
- Sensors & processing systems: L-3 C4ISR suite
- Armament: 1 × Mk 38 Mod 2 25 mm automatic gun; 4 × crew-served Browning M2 machine guns

USCGC Bailey Barco (WPC-1122) is the United States Coast Guard's 22nd Sentinel-class cutter, and the second to be stationed in Alaska, where she was homeported at Coast Guard Base Ketchikan.

The vessel's manufacturer, Bollinger Shipyards, of Lockport, Louisiana, delivered the ship to the Coast Guard on February 7, 2017, for her acceptance trials. After completion sea trials, USCGC Bailey Barco was commissioned on June 14, 2017 in Juneau, Alaska.

== Mission ==
The Sentinel-class cutters are lightly armed patrol vessels with a crew of approximately two dozen sailors, capable of traveling almost 3,000 nautical miles, on five day missions. The cutter is a multi-mission vessel intended to perform law enforcement, search and rescue, fisheries and environmental protection, and homeland security tasks.

== Namesake ==
Bailey T. Barco was the station keeper of the Dam Neck Mills Life-Saving Station of the United States Lifesaving Service, which later merged with the Revenue Cutter Service to form the U.S. Coast Guard. Barco earned a Gold Lifesaving Medal for managing the daring rescue of the crew of the sailing schooner Jennie Hall, which ran aground during a severe winter storm off Virginia Beach in 1901.

In 2010, Charles "Skip" W. Bowen, who was then the United States Coast Guard's most senior non-commissioned officer, proposed that all cutters in the Sentinel class should be named after enlisted sailors in the Coast Guard, or one of its precursor services, who were recognized for their heroism. In 2014 the Coast Guard announced that Bailey Barco would be the namesake of the 22nd cutter.
