= Charles E. Larkin =

United States Coast Guard vice admiral

- Born: October 21, 1927 (age 98); Los Angeles, California, U.S.
- Allegiance: United States of America
- Branch: United States Coast Guard
- Service years: 1949–1980s
- Rank: Vice admiral

Charles E. Larkin (born October 21, 1927) is a retired United States Coast Guard vice admiral.

== Early life ==
Larkin was born in Los Angeles, California, and graduated from high school in Seattle, Washington. After enlisting in the Coast Guard in January 1945, he entered the Coast Guard Academy in June of that year, and graduated with the class of 1949.

== Career ==
Following four years at the academy Larkin reported to the Boston-based USCGC Bibb. There, while serving as navigator, Larkin was awarded the Silver Lifesaving Medal for rescuing a drowning crewmember who had fallen into the harbor after slipping from an icy dock.

In 1985, after another year on a Boston homeported ocean station vessel, Larkin entered the Navy Flight Training Program, graduating in September 1952. He spent the next six years flying at various aviation commands from CGAS Salem, to CGAS Kodiak. In 1957 Larkin received training as a helicopter pilot and while assigned to CGAS San Francisco was awarded the Air Medal for the helicopter rescue of a seriously injured man from a vessel 38 miles offshore in a fog bank.

The early sixties saw Larkin continuing his involvement with Coast Guard aviation, going from Barbers Point, Hawaii to CGAS Elizabeth City. and to Naples, Italy where Larkin served as commanding officer. In 1968, then commander, Larkin became a distinguished graduate of the Air War College at Maxwell AFB. Also during this period he acquired a master of science degree from George Washington University.

After two years as executive officer of the Coast Guard Aviation Training Center in Mobile, Larkin returned to CGAS San Francisco as commanding officer. The air station received the Commandant's Letter of Commendation Ribbon and he was awarded the Coast Guard Commendation Medal. After three years on the West Coast, Larkin was assigned to Coast Guard Headquarters as chief of the aviation branch where he earned the Meritorious Service Medal.

While serving as Chief of Staff, 7th Coast Guard District in Miami, Larkin was selected for promotion to flag rank and received his new stars in July 1976, and also was awarded a second Meritorious Service Medal. He then assumed the responsibilities of chief, office of personnel at Coast Guard Headquarters where he was awarded his third Meritorious Service Medal. Larkin left Washington, D.C. in the summer of 1978 for Seattle, where he took over as Commander, 13th Coast Guard District. During this period Larkin received the Legion of Merit. He then served as Superintendent, U.S. Coast Guard Academy until June 1982.

Larkin retired as a Vice Admiral in 1984.

== Personal ==
Larkin is married to the former Katherin Phillips Buck of Glastonbury. They have four children.

== Decorations ==
=== Coast Guard Distinguished Service Medal citation ===
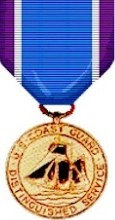

The President of the United States of America takes pleasure in presenting the Coast Guard Distinguished Service Medal to Vice Admiral Charles Earll Larkin, United States Coast Guard, for exceptionally meritorious service to the Government of the United States in a position of great responsibility as Commander, Coast Guard Pacific Area and Commander, Twelfth Coast Guard District from June 1982 to July 1984. Drawing on his superb leadership and extensive experience, he met the demands of myriad complex problems as well as expanding roles and missions within the Pacific Area. Anticipating his designation as the first Commander, United States Maritime Defense Zone, Pacific, Vice Admiral Larkin strengthened relations with the Navy and started basic planning to implement this important national security effort. By focusing on military readiness training, reprogramming personnel resources and pursuing an aggressive law enforcement posture, he improved the operational capabilities of units throughout the Pacific Area. His interest in and support of the National effort to reduce the importation of illegal drugs and his solid understanding of organizational relationships and how to make them work greatly facilitated the establishment and smooth functioning of the Pacific Regional Center of NNBIS. Vice Admiral Larkin instituted an aggressive fuel conservation program which resulted in thousands of dollars becoming available for needed expenditures in cutter maintenance and improvements. An energetic and involved Regional Emergency Transportation Coordinator for Federal Region TX, he oversaw the development and implementation of a new emergency communications capability which now serves as a national model for the organization's communications system. Vice Admiral Larkin especially distinguished himself and the Coast Guard through his enthusiastic and highly effective representation of the Service at events throughout the Pacific Basin and Western United States, including his presence as the senior naval officer during the official state visit of the Queen of England in March 1983. Vice Admiral Larkin's leadership, dedication and devotion to duty are most heartily commended and are in keeping with the highest traditions of the United States Coast Guard.

=== Legion of Merit citation ===
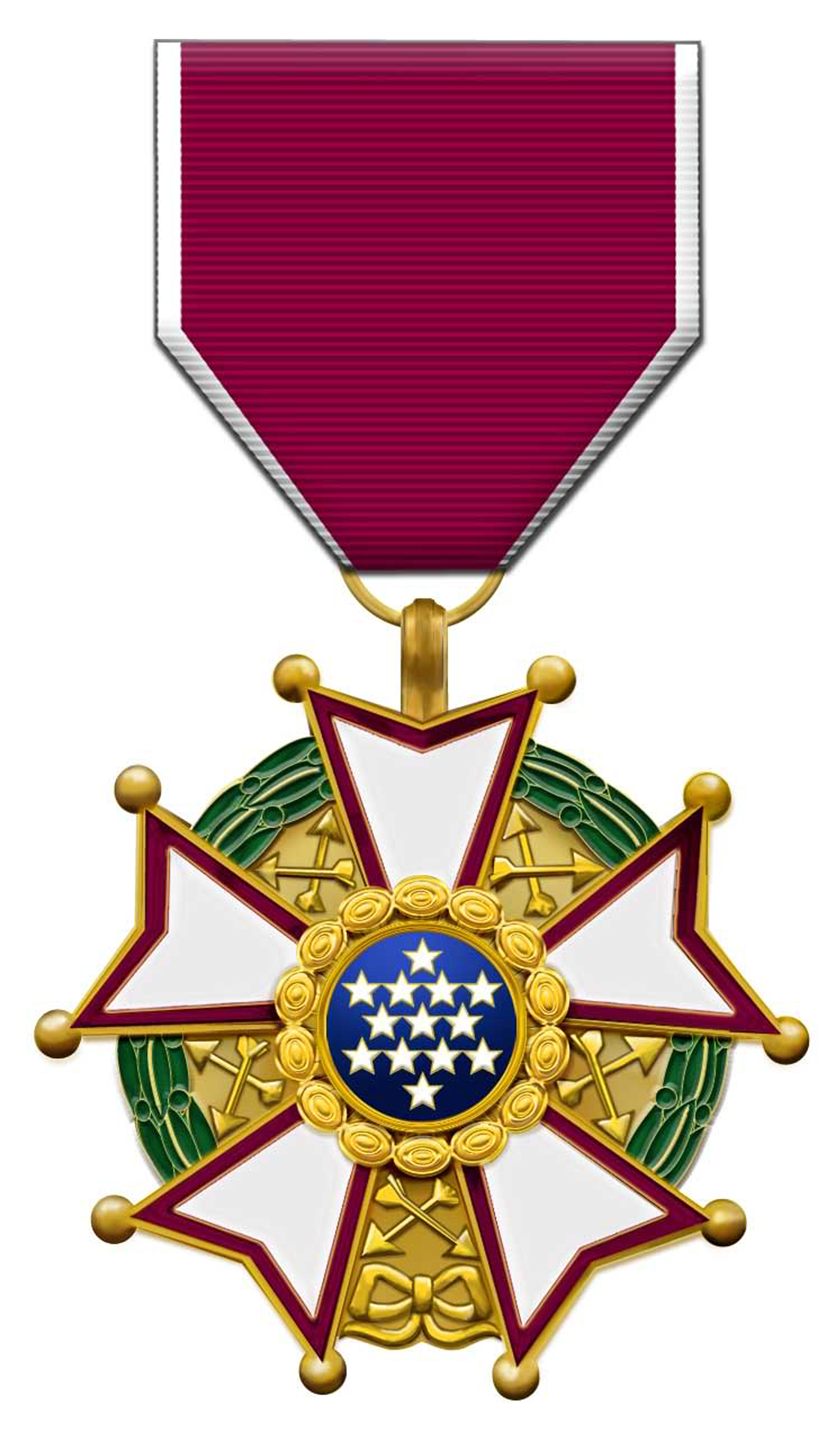

The President of the United States of America takes pleasure in presenting the Legion of Merit to Rear Admiral Charles Earll Larkin, United States Coast Guard, for exceptionally meritorious conduct in his performance of outstanding service as Commander, Thirteenth Coast Guard District from June 1978 to July 1981. During this period he faced a wide variety of demanding challenges which required the application of extraordinary insight, judgment, leadership and perseverance. The successful meeting of these challenges is exemplified by the completion of a major expansion to the Puget Sound Vessel Traffic Service, on time and within budget, to be followed by the first joint vessel traffic management service between the United States and Canada; by the culmination of Federal enforcement of the contentious Washington State Fishery under the Holdt Decision; then a shift in emphasis to the offshore fisheries by regular attendance at, and participation in, the deliberations of the Pacific Fisheries Management Council. He was also instrumental in the execution of a precedent setting agreement with the Oregon State Pilotage Commission, and the establishment of operational standards for small boat stations to assure adequate and timely action with limited personnel. These standards were complemented by an annual Ready for Operations evaluation which measured the significant improvement in response posture. Rear Admiral LARKTN initiated voluntary examinations for un-inspected towing and fishing vessels; and he provided positive and dynamic leadership in the Coast Guard's Human Relations Programs, including a pioneering Civil Rights program devised in the Thirteenth District which greatly improved the interest and response of the Coast Guardsmen throughout the District. The citizens of the Pacific Northwest are vigorous and often vocal advocates of maintaining the superb quality of the life of the region. Through his frequent and regular interaction with individuals and organizations throughout the District, Rear Admiral Larkin has garnered enthusiastic support for the Coast Guard through community initiated activities such as Coast Guard week, 25 through 31 January 1981, in the Seattle area. Rear Admiral Larkin's exceptional ability, inspiring leadership and zealous devotion to duty are most heartily commended and are in keeping with the highest traditions of the United States Coast Guard.
