= Benjamin B. Dailey =

US keeper of lifeboat stations (1844–1914)

Benjamin Baxter Dailey
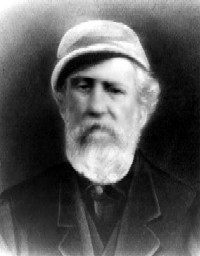
- Benjamin Dailey, via the NPS.
- Born: May 23, 1844
- Died: November 19, 1914 (aged 70)
- Occupation: Keeper of United States Life-Saving Service lifeboat stations
- Known for: Leading the rescue of the crew of the Ephraim Williams.

Benjamin Baxter Dailey (1844–1914) was the keeper of several lifeboat stations for the United States Life-Saving Service—one of the precursor services to the United States Coast Guard. On December 22, 1884, when he commanded the Cape Hatteras Lifeboat Station, he led the rescue of nine men from the barkentine Ephraim Williams. The stranded men had been shipwrecked in a heavy storm for 90 hours, five miles, or alternatively seven miles, (sources differ) off the coast of Cape Hatteras.

For this rescue, Dailey and his six-man crew were awarded the Gold Lifesaving Medal. Of the twelve Gold Lifesaving Medals awarded by the Life-Saving Service in its first thirty years, seven were awarded for this rescue. According to Life magazine Dailey apologized to superiors for the lateness of his report on the rescue, explaining that he wasn't able to write for seven days because his hands were too injured from the exertion to hold a pen.

The US National Park Service has preserved Dailey's medal at its Hatteras Museum.

David Stick, author of Graveyard of the Atlantic: Shipwrecks of the North Carolina Coast, describes how, when Dailey was keeper of the Creed's Hill Lifesaving Station, he and his crew made their wills prior to setting out to rescue the crew of the A. B. Goodman in the pre-dawn hours of April 4, 1881; they knew that unless the current offshore wind changed, they would be unable to return. In the event, the wind shifted to onshore as the Goodman began to break up, allowing them to row to safety with her four surviving crewmen.

In 2014 the Coast Guard announced that the 23rd Sentinel class cutter would be named after Benjamin Dailey. All the Sentinel class cutters are to be named after men and women who have been recognized as heroes serving in the US Coast Guard, or a precursor service. The USCGC Benjamin Dailey was commissioned in Pascagoula, Mississippi on July 4, 2017,.
