= Isaac Mayo (Surfman USCG) =

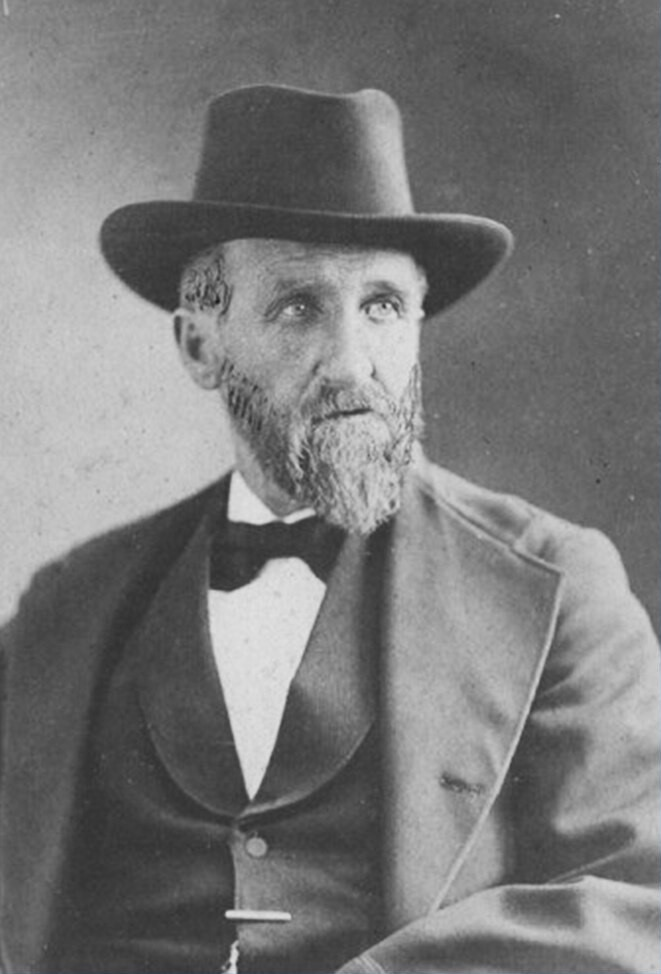
- Born: September 28, 1826; Provincetown, Massachusetts
- Died: April 6, 1912 (aged 85); Tower City, North Dakota
- Other name: Ike Mayo
- Occupations: seaman, farmer
- Known for: heroic life saving

Isaac Franklin Mayo (September 28, 1826 – April 6, 1912) was a junior surfman in the United States Life-Saving Service, one of the agencies later amalgamated into the United States Coast Guard in 1915.

Mayo was born in Provincetown, Massachusetts on September 28, 1826. As a Cape Cod mariner, he became a volunteer for the Humane Society of the Commonwealth of Massachusetts, one of the precursors of the United States Life-Saving Service. On January 5, 1856, he was leader and coxswain of a five-man surfboat crew which rescued five survivors from the grounded schooner Clarendon. The Humane Society awarded Silver Medals to Mayo and his crew for their bravery.

On April 4, 1879, he led multiple and eventually successful efforts to rescue seamen stranded in an offshore wreck at the height of a violent storm. The schooner Sarah J. Fort was wrecked on a sandbank just off Cape Cod. Initial attempts to row a rescue boat out to the wrecked and disintegrating schooner failed, with two boatmen lost overboard. By the time the tide had gone out the initial rescue crew was exhausted, and Mayo was part of a second boat crew. The boat was swamped and wrecked. Mayo rallied and led a third rescue attempt in a smaller rescue boat that was ultimately successful at rescuing the last four survivors of the schooner's crew.

To honor his bravery and leadership, the Life-Saving Service honored Mayo with a Gold Lifesaving Medal. The Humane Society of the Commonwealth of Massachusetts awarded Mayo and the rest of the rescue boat's crew Silver Medals. As the captain of the rescue boat, Mayo was also awarded what the Humane Society called a "Diploma."

In 1880, Mayo, his wife and grandson moved to North Dakota, where they took up farming. Isaac Mayo died on April 6, 1912 in Tower City and is buried in nearby Oriska Cemetery.

== USCGC Isaac Mayo ==
In 2010, when the Coast Guard decided that all the new Sentinel class cutters would be named after Coast Guard personnel who had been recognized for their heroism, Mayo was one of those to be honored. The twelfth cutter in the class, named the USCGC Isaac Mayo, was commissioned on March 28, 2015.
