= USCGC Isaac Mayo =

USCGC Isaac Mayo (WPC-1112)
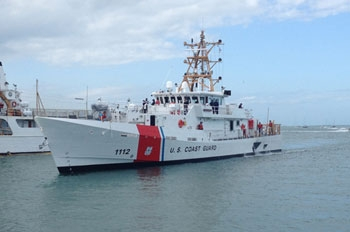
- USCGC Isaac Mayo

History

United States
- Namesake: Isaac Mayo
- Builder: Bollinger Shipyards, Lockport, Louisiana
- Launched: January 13, 2015
- Acquired: January 13, 2015
- Commissioned: March 28, 2015
- Home port: Key West, FL
- Identification: MMSI number: 338926412; Callsign: NEAP; Hull number: WPC-1112
- Motto: The will to serve, courage to protect
- Status: in active service
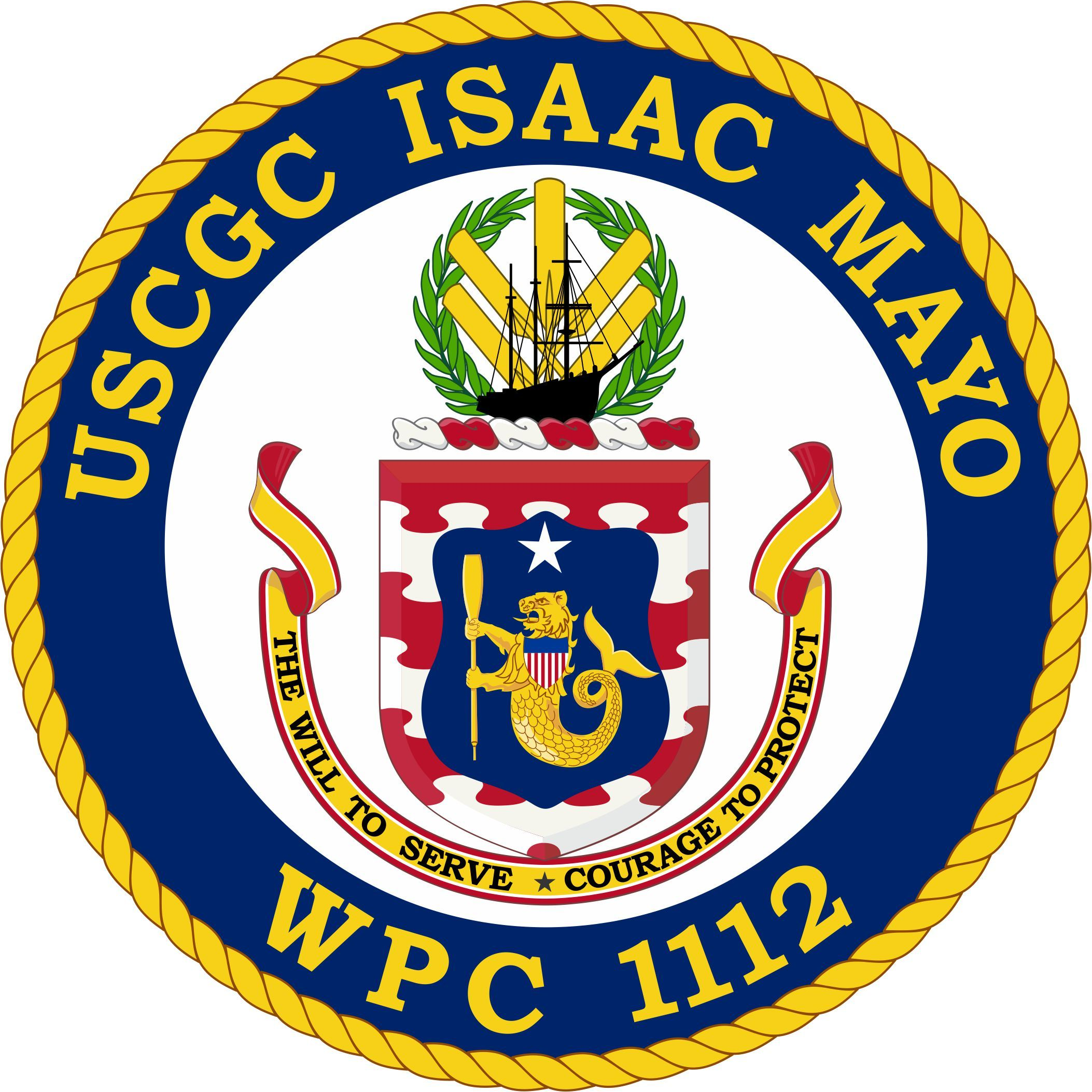
- Badge

General characteristics
- Class & type: Sentinel-class cutter
- Displacement: 353 long tons (359 t)
- Length: 46.8 m (154 ft)
- Beam: 8.11 m (26.6 ft)
- Depth: 2.9 m (9.5 ft)
- Propulsion: 2 × 4,300 kW (5,800 shp); 1 × 75 kW (101 shp) bow thruster
- Speed: 28 knots (52 km/h; 32 mph)
- Endurance: 5 days, 2,500 nmi (4,600 km; 2,900 mi); Designed to be on patrol 2,500 hours per year
- Boats & landing craft carried: 1 × Short Range Prosecutor RHIB
- Complement: 2 officers, 20 crew
- Sensors & processing systems: L-3 C4ISR suite
- Armament: 1 × Mk 38 Mod 2 25 mm automatic gun; 4 × Browning M2 .50 cal machine guns; Various small arms

USCGC Isaac Mayo is a Sentinel-class cutter homeported in Key West, Florida. She is the twelfth Sentinel class to be delivered, and the sixth of six to be assigned to Key West.

Like her sister ships, she is equipped for coastal security patrols, interdiction of drug and people smugglers, and search and rescue. Like the smaller Marine Protector class she is equipped with a stern launching ramp. The ramp allows the deployment and retrieval of her high speed water-jet powered pursuit boat without first coming to a stop. She is capable of more than 25 knots (46 km/h; 29 mph) and armed with a remote controlled 25 millimetres (0.98 in) M242 Bushmaster autocannon; and four crew-served Browning M2 machine guns.

== Operational history ==
On April 4, 2016, Isaac Mayo intercepted a small boat with twenty-two Cuban refugees on board. The refugees had gone off course, and had entered Bahamas territory.

== Namesake ==
She is named after Isaac Mayo, who served a surfman at a lifeboat station on Cape Cod. Mayo was an employee of the United States Life-Saving Service, one of the precursor services that were amalgamated into the Coast Guard.
