= Wreck of the Ephraim Williams =

1884 shipwreck off North Carolina, US

Coordinates: 35.30391°N 75.51023°W

The Ephraim Williams was a sailing ship wrecked off the coast of Hatteras Island, North Carolina, during a late December storm, late in 1884. The rescue of the barkentine's crew by Benjamin B. Dailey and his six oarsmen of the United States Lifesaving Service was considered particularly heroic, and the rescue is celebrated to the present day.

== Background ==
The 491-ton vessel's homeport was Providence, Rhode Island.

Cape Hatteras is the easternmost tip of a chain of barrier islands. Off the beach are an inner and outer sandbank. The difficulty in crossing the outer sandbank increases with the size of the waves.

== Incident ==
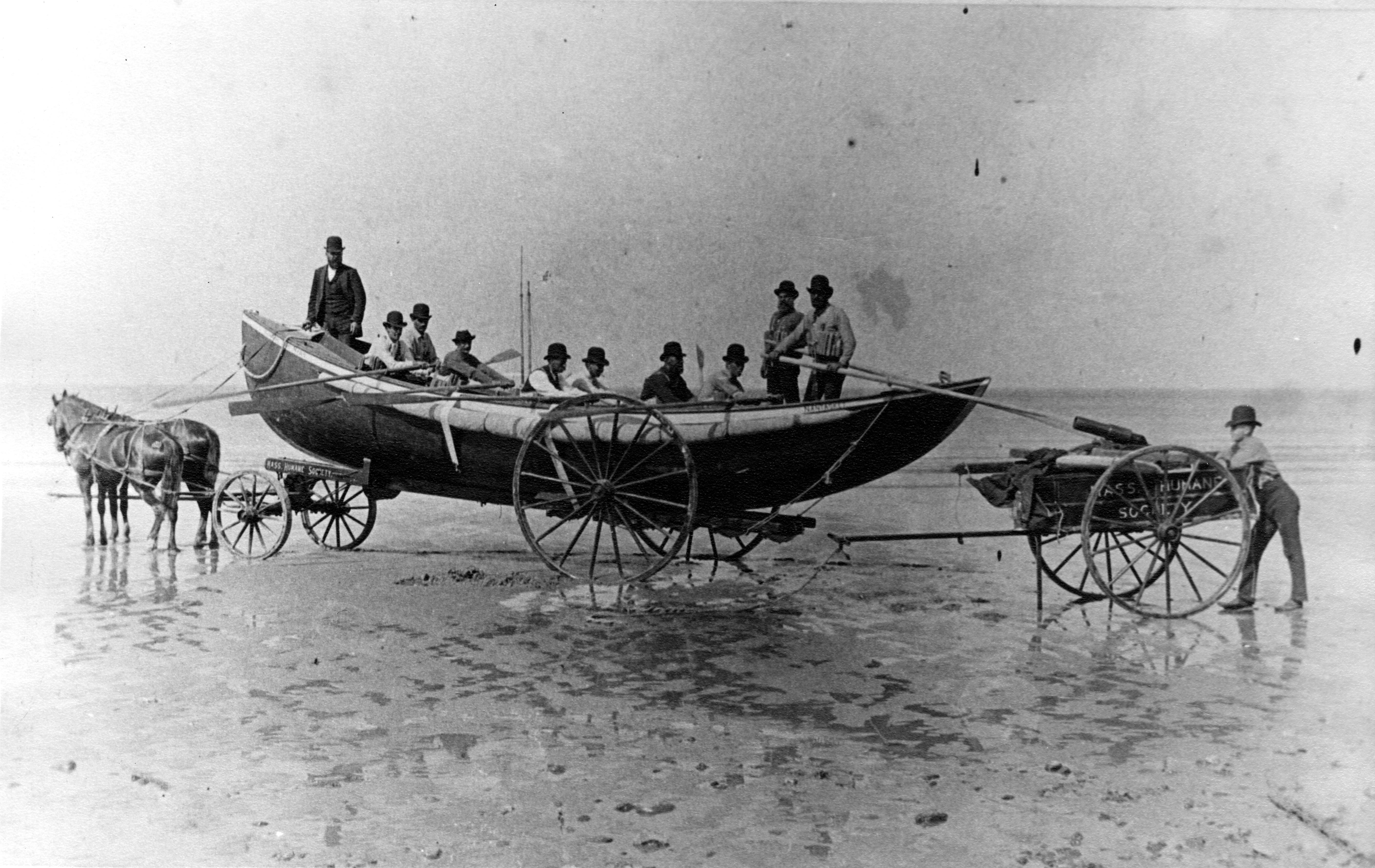
A surfboat, like those used to rescue the Ephraim Williams crew, would be towed on a cart like this one, to a suitable launching spot, where she would be pushed into the water deep enough to float her off the cart.

Ephraim Williams was returning to Cape Hatteras with a load of timber from Savannah, Georgia, when she became waterlogged and unmanageable on December 18, 1884, off Frying Pan Shoals. The vessel became visible to staff at four lifesaving stations on December 21. Heavy surf made launching a rescue boat extremely hazardous. Only the waterlogged wreck's masts were visible. Lifesaving staff couldn't tell whether there were any survivors to try to rescue. The vessel was seen again on the morning of December 22, off Diamond Shoal.

When the Ephraim Williams crew raised a distress flag, shortly before 10:30 am, confirming there were survivors onboard who needed rescue, surfboats from several stations launched to attempt a rescue. The second in command of Dailey's lifeboat stated that his wife was dying at home, and he had no wish to make his children orphans. Patrick H. Etheridge, the keeper of the nearby Creed's Hill Lifesaving Station quickly volunteered to take his place.

The crew of the rescue surfboat of the Cape Hatteras Lifesaving Station proved it was possible to cross the sandbank, during heavy weather, with precise timing, and extreme effort, in order cross the bar at the height of a wave. With enough effort they proved a skilled and determined crew could cross over the bar before it was swept by the next trough. The crews of the other surfboats were unable to cross the outer bar.

The surfboat's crew then rowed five miles (8.0 km) to the distressed vessel. Crew members had to board the stricken vessel and bodily carry some of the exhausted crew to the boat. Dailey and Etheridge switched roles, and Etheridge guided the boat during the dangerous return to shore. Observers described the waves that day as the worst they had ever seen, and described their concern that the rescuers themselves would lose their lives.

== Commendation ==
The officer that recommended the crew receive the US Coast Guard Gold Lifesaving Medal wrote:

I do not believe that a greater act of heroism is recorded than that of Dailey and his crew on this momentous occasion. These poor, plain men, dwellers upon the lonely sands of Hatteras, took their lives in their hands and, at the most imminent risk, crossed the most tumultuous sea that any boat within the memory of living men had ever attempted on that bleak coast, and all for what. That others might live to see home and friends. The thought of reward or mercenary appeal never once entered their minds. Duty, their sense of obligation, and the credit of the Service impelled them to do their mighty best. The names of Benjamin B. Dailey and his comrades in this magnificent feat should never be forgotten. As long as the Life-Saving Service has the good fortune to number among its keepers and crews such men as these, no fear need ever be entertained for its good name or purposes.

David Stick, the author of Graveyard of the Atlantic: Shipwrecks of the North Carolina Coast, noted that: "During the first thirty years of operation of the Lifesaving Service on the North Carolina coast a total of twelve Gold Lifesaving Medals, the highest such award made by our government, were presented for exceptional bravery in saving life." Of this number, seven—more than half—were awarded to the lifesavers from Cape Hatteras and Creed's Hill stations who rescued the crew of the barkentine Ephraim Williams, December 22, 1884. Dailey's crew consisted of oarsmen Isaac L. Jennett, Thomas Gray, John H. Midgett, Jabez B. Jennett, and Patrick H. Etheridge, the station keeper at nearby Creed's Hill, who was filling in for an absent oarsman. Dailey's medal remains on display at the Cape Hatteras National Seashore's Hatteras Island Visitor Center and Museum of the Sea.
