= Oakland Harbor Light =

Lighthouse in California, United States

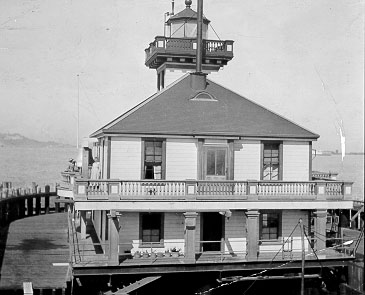
- Oakland Harbor Light at Embarcadero Cove by U.S. Coast Guard Archive
- Location: Embarcadero Cove; Oakland; California; United States
- Coordinates: 37.781335°N 122.243817°W

Tower
- Constructed: 1890 (first); 1903 (second)
- Foundation: concrete pilings (second)
- Construction: wooden tower (second)
- Automated: 1966 (current)
- Shape: square on the center of keeper's house (second)
- Markings: white tower (second)
- Operator: Quinns Lighthouse Restaurant & Pub
- Fog signal: struck every 5s. (bell) blast every 15s. (diaphone)

Light
- First lit: 1966 (current automated beacon at the end of the pier)
- Deactivated: 1966 (second) and relocated
- Focal height: 26 m (85 ft)
- Lens: Fifth order Fresnel lens (removed)
- Range: 14 nautical miles (26 km; 16 mi)
- Characteristic: Fl W 5s.

Oakland Harbor Light is a former lighthouse, now a restaurant in Embarcadero Cove, California.

== History ==
The original tower was built in 1890 at the entrance of Oakland Harbor. The wooden pilings on which the structure sat had deteriorated by 1902, and a larger replacement lighthouse was constructed on concrete pilings nearby, which began operation in 1903. The original structure was then sold and removed. In 1966, the lighthouse was replaced by an automated beacon and deactivated. It was eventually sold to a private party and relocated to Embarcadero Cove in Oakland, where it opened in 1984 as Quinn's Lighthouse Restaurant. The lantern room was removed after deactivation in 1966, and was transferred to Mark Abbott Memorial Lighthouse in Santa Cruz, California, where it continued to deteriorate and was replaced in 1996.

== See also ==
- List of lighthouses in the United States
