= Lifesaving Medal =

US decoration from the Coast Guard

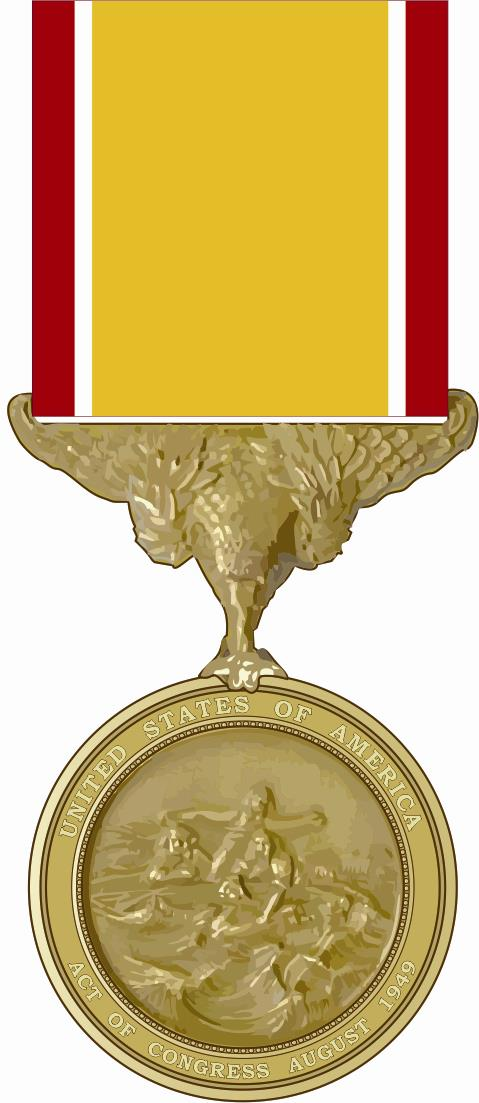
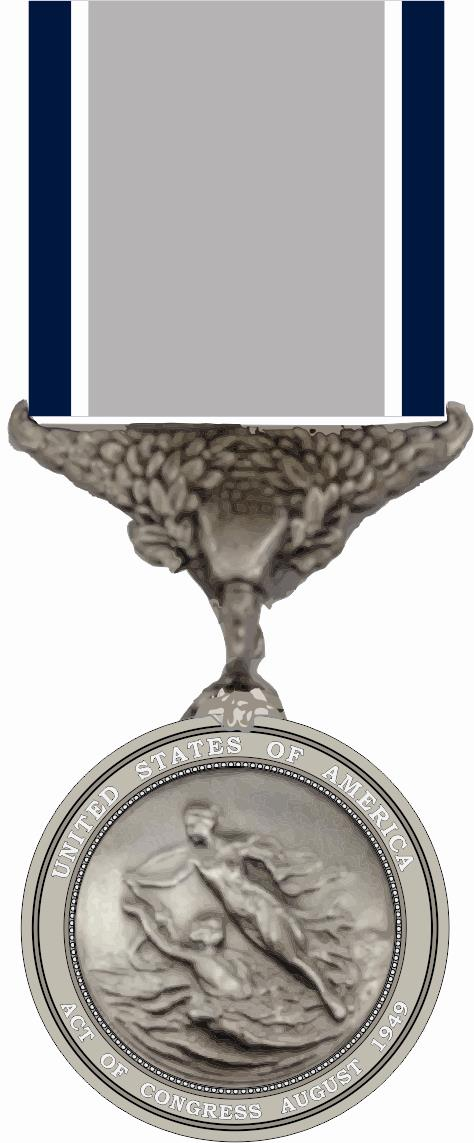
- Gold and Silver Lifesaving Medals
- Awarded for: Rescuing, or endeavoring to rescue, any other person from drowning, shipwreck, or other perils of the water.
- Country: United States
- Presented by: United States Coast Guard
- Eligibility: Open
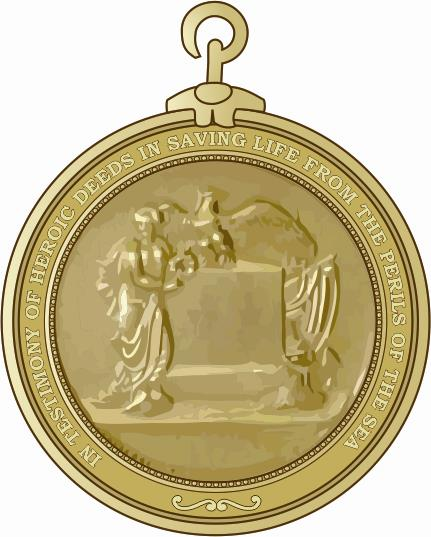
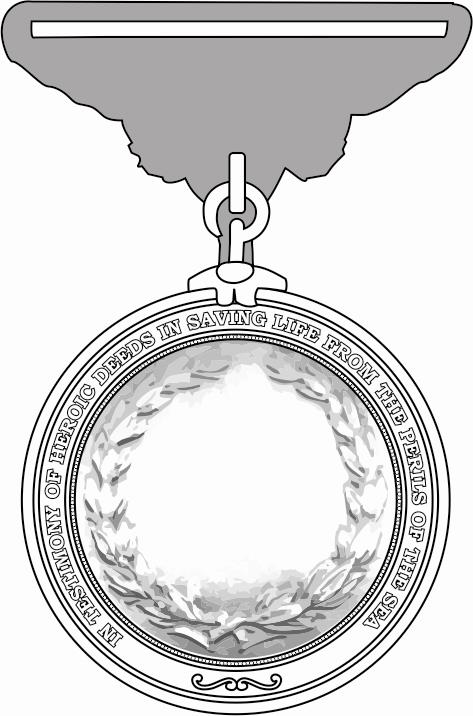
- Reverse
- Established: 20 June 1874

Highlights
- Total: 600+ Gold Lifesaving Medals; 1,900+ Silver Lifesaving Medals
- Gold Lifesaving Medal ribbon and Silver Lifesaving Medal ribbon

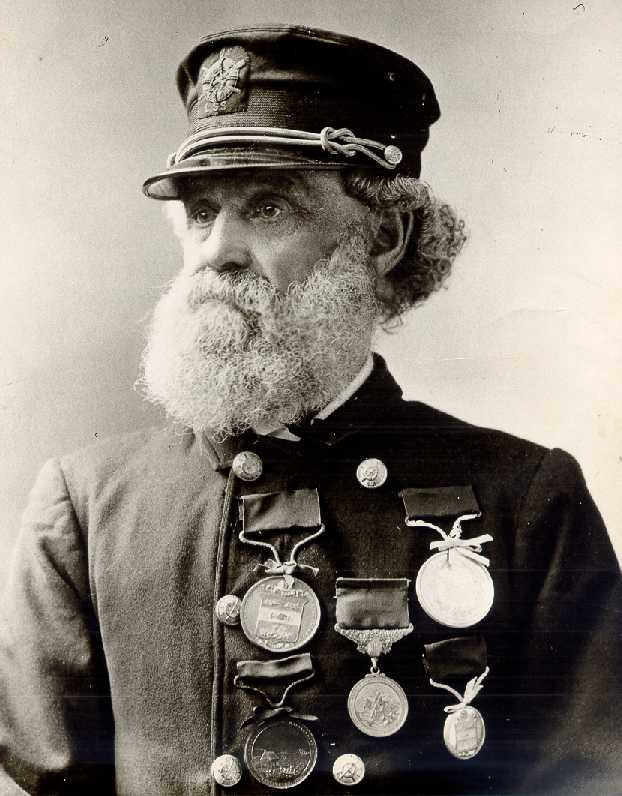
Famed life-saver Joshua James wearing the Gold Lifesaving Medal among other awards

The Gold Lifesaving Medal and Silver Lifesaving Medal are U.S. decorations issued by the United States Coast Guard. The awards were established by Act of Congress, 20 June 1874; later authorized by 14 U.S.C. § 500. These decorations are two of the oldest medals in the United States and were originally established at the Department of Treasury as Lifesaving Medals First and Second Class. The Department of the Treasury initially gave the award, but today the United States Coast Guard awards it through the Department of Homeland Security. They are not classified as military decorations, and may be awarded to any person.

== History ==
A British Sea Gallantry Medal for saving life was authorized in 1854. Twenty years later in the United States the Gold and Silver Lifesaving Medals were first authorized in an Act (18 Stat 125, 43rd Congress) that furthered the United States Life-Saving Service. The Secretary of the Treasury was directed, among other provisions of the act, to create "medals of honor", to be distinguished as life-saving medals of the first and second class, and bestow them upon any persons who endanger their own lives in saving, or endeavoring to save lives from perils of the sea, within the United States, or upon any American vessel.

The Lifesaving Medals have had multiple designs in their history.

- The original LS-5 design in 1874 was "non-portable" and could not be worn by the recipient, but rather displayed much like a trophy. It contained 11 ounces (310 g) of gold.
- In 1877, the diameter was reduced from 76 millimetres (3.0 in) to 50 millimetres (2.0 in), while the gold content was dropped to 3 ounces (85 g) to create the LS-7 design.
- In 1882 the design was changed again so that the medal was suspended from a two inch wide ribbon. The ribbon was red for the Gold Lifesaving Medal and light blue for the Silver Lifesaving medal.
- Finally on 4 August 1949 the medals and ribbons were reduced in size so that they were more proportionate to medals awarded by the U.S. Armed Forces. The ribbons were also redesigned to have multiple colors.

The laws governing the awarding of medal were amended over the years, and is currently awarded by the U.S. Coast Guard. The Commandant of the Coast Guard makes the final determination in authorizing the award, but the Lifesaving Medals are not military awards, per se, and instead are "Federal Agency personal decorations" of the Department of Homeland Security and as such may be awarded to not only military members, but also civilians.

"The Gold Lifesaving Medal or the Silver Lifesaving Medal may be awarded to any person who rescues or endeavors to rescue any other person from drowning, shipwreck, or other perils of the water. The rescue or attempted rescue must either take place in waters within the U.S. or subject to the jurisdiction thereof, or one or the other of the parties must be a citizen of the U.S. or from a vessel or aircraft owned or operated by citizens of the U.S."

The Lifesaving Medal is issued in two grades, being gold and silver. "The Gold Lifesaving Medal may be awarded to an individual who performed a rescue or attempted rescue at the risk of his or her own life, and demonstrates extreme and heroic daring. The Silver Lifesaving Medal may be awarded to an individual who performed a rescue or attempted rescue where the circumstances do not sufficiently distinguish the individual to deserve the medal of gold, but demonstrate such extraordinary effort as to merit recognition. If neither the Gold nor Silver Lifesaving Medal is appropriate, then a Certificate of Valor or an appropriate Coast Guard Public Service Award may be considered."

Until the mid-20th century, the Lifesaving Medal was often bestowed upon members of the military; however in recent times the decoration has become somewhat rare. This is due primarily to the creation of a variety of additional military decorations that supplant the Lifesaving Medal. The United States Navy often issues the Navy and Marine Corps Medal, instead of the Lifesaving Medal, for sea rescues involving risk of life. "Military personnel serving on active duty would normally not be recommended for Gold and Silver Lifesaving Medals; however, military personnel may be recommended for a Lifesaving Medal if the act of heroism was performed while the individual was in a leave or liberty status. In all other circumstances, a military award should be considered." While the Lifesaving Medals may be proffered to, and accepted by, Department of Defense personnel, the Medals are no longer authorized for wear on U.S. military uniforms of the DoD Services (Army, Marine Corps, Navy, Air Force, Space Force). Such awards may become part of service records, and used for other purposes, however.

The U.S. Coast Guard, while an armed force and military service at all times, normally is part of the Department of Homeland Security. As such, awards of the DHS may be bestowed directly upon civilians, including U.S. Coast Guard civilian employees and contractors, while recommendations for award of the Lifesaving Medals to U.S. military members will be coordinated with the servicemembers' parent Service; this provides not only notification to the relevant military commanders that their servicemember(s) were involved in a lifesaving event, but allows the opportunity for that commander to award a Service decoration such as the Soldier's Medal, Navy and Marine Corps Medal, Airman's Medal, or Coast Guard Medal, instead of the DHS-awarded Lifesaving Medals. Within the Coast Guard, as a non-DoD agency, the gold medal's precedence for wear is immediately following the Coast Guard Medal, while the silver medal's precedence for wear is immediately following the Air Medal. However, the appropriate precedence for display—but not wear—of the Lifesaving Medals in other Services is among the category of "Federal Agency personal decorations", directly below the Prisoner of War Medal.

The Lifesaving Medal is unusual among U.S. medals because it is actually struck from the eponymous precious metal, silver or gold.

Multiple awards of the Gold Lifesaving Medal are denoted by a gold bar, while multiple awards of the Silver Lifesaving Medal are denoted by a silver bar.

Since 1874, more than 600 Gold Lifesaving Medals and more than 1,900 Silver Lifesaving Medals have been awarded.

== Notable recipients ==
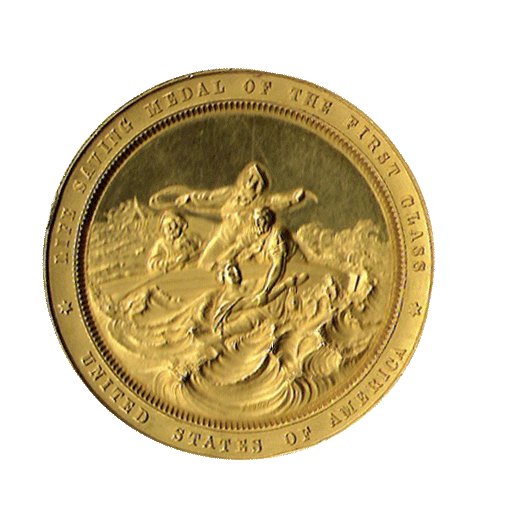
Life Saving Medal 1st Class (2” 1877 design)

=== Gold Medal ===
- MSgt Rodney Buentello, USMC (Retired), sacrificed his life rescuing two teens from the Medina River in Texas on June 8, 2016. Medal posthumously Awarded, August 1, 2017.
- William Babb, for the 1885 rescue of the American schooner A.C. Maxwell.
- Lieutenant Luke Christopher, USCG (posthumously) for the rescue of Seaman John Barrina from the SS Charles G. Black on 5 December 1936. Christopher was stationed at Coast Guard Air Station Cape May. While airlifting Barrina to the hospital, one of the pontoons on the Douglas RD-2 Dolphin named Adhara caught a stray fishing net and crashed at sea. Christopher survived the initial crash but succumbed to his wounds shortly after.
- Keeper Benjamin Dailey, USLSS keeper of the Cape Hatteras Lifeboat Station, led the rescue of the crew of the Ephraim Williams.
- Daniel Miller, for saving lives from the wreck of the steamship H.C. Akeley on Nov. 13, 1883 in Lake Michigan, near Grand Haven, Michigan. Miller was the first mate of The Driver when the rescue took place.
- Surfmen Richard Etheridge, Benjamin Bowser, Dorman Pugh, Theodore Meekins, Lewis Wescott, Stanley Wise, and William Irving of the Pea Island Life-Saving Station, for rescue of the crew from the E.S. Newman on 11 October 1896. Awarded gold medals posthumously on 5 March 1996.
- George Freeth, a swimming instructor, lifeguard, and surfer who rescued seven fishermen off Venice Beach during a winter storm in December 1908.
- Vice Admiral Harry G. Hamlet, U.S. Coast Guard – While in command of USS Marietta in the Bay of Biscay on 28 April 1919, rescued a crew of 47 persons from the sinking USS James
- Keeper Marcus Hanna, USLHS – Only person to receive both the Medal of Honor and the Gold Lifesaving Medal.
- Captain Joshua James, USLSS – Legendary lifesaver. James, along with 10 members of his lifesaving crew, rescued 13 people from two ships stranded off Hull, Massachusetts during a northeast gale on 25 to 26 November 1888.
- Jonas Johns - Native American who rescued the 14-man crew of the schooner Lily Grace wrecked near Gray's Harbor, Washington in January 1887 and a year later rescued 3 more sailors. Medal awarded on 9 December 1889.
- James Larsin, fisherman and Wisconsin state legislator.
- Keeper Ida Lewis, USLHS lighthouse keeper and first female recipient.
- Erick Lundberg, U.S. Coast Guard Auxiliary - Rescued a fisherman in heavy seas.
- Frank Mauro, U.S. Coast Guard Auxiliary - Rescued four people.
- Surfman Isaac Mayo, USLSS
- Chief Warrant Officer John Allen Midgett Jr., USCG
- Surfman Rasmus Midgett, USLSS - Single handedly rescued seven mariners.
- Captain Henry C. Mustin, USN - Naval aviation pioneer.
- Jack Newick, Lobsterman and restauranteur. Earned medal in 1984 for rescuing two people trapped in a capsized sailboat. Medal awarded in 1996.
- Commander Glenn L. Rollins, USCG - Led effort to rescue 18 sailors stranded in Alaska in 1938.
- Aviation Machinists Mate First Class Augustus Butler Rowland (1903–1972), USN, presented by President Calvin Coolidge, for saving a shipmate in the crash of an F-5-L "flying boat" seaplane near Pensacola, Florida on Jan 21, 1925.
- Sheppard Shreaves, civilian diver who rescued Torpedoman 2nd Class Henry Breault, who later received the Medal of Honor, during the salvage of the submarine USS O-5
- Lenny Skutnik - Federal employee who rescued a passenger of Air Florida Flight 90 at the risk of his own life.
- Arland D. Williams, Jr. - Passenger on ill-fated Air Florida Flight 90.
- Boatswain's Mate First Class Bernard C. Webber, USCG; Engineman Third Class Andrew Fitzgerald, USCG; Seaman Richard Livesey, USCG; and Seaman Irving Maske, USCG, all stationed at Coast Guard Station Chatham, Massachusetts, for the rescue of 32 crewmen of the T2 tanker SS Pendleton on 18 February 1952. This rescue is depicted in the 2016 movie The Finest Hours.
- Rear Admiral Lucien Young, USN, veteran of the Spanish–American War. Received for actions while an ensign on 12 June 1878.

=== Silver Medal ===
- Captain Richard L. Burke, USCG, Coast Guard aviation pioneer.
- Rear Admiral Richard Evelyn Byrd, USN – Organized, led and flew on first flights over the North Pole and South Pole.
- Floyd William Carlson, Chief Test Pilot, Bell Aircraft Corporation, rescued two fishermen marooned on crumbling ice two miles out in Lake Erie in March 1945. This was the first time a helicopter was used for rescue purposes.
- Assistant Keeper George D. Cobb, of the Oakland Harbor lighthouse, for saving two men whose sailboat capsized on 26 December 1896.
- Major General Byron F. Johnson, USMC - Rescued a man from drowning near San Diego in 1929.
- Vice Admiral Charles E. Larkin, USCG
- Mary McCann, a 14 year old Irish girl who rescued survivors of the PS General Slocum disaster in 1904.
- Rear Admiral William A. Moffett, USN - Medal of Honor recipient.
- Fleet Admiral Chester W. Nimitz, USN – Commander of the Pacific Fleet during World War II. For rescuing a drowning sailor.
- General George S. Patton, USA – commander of Third United States Army.
- Major General Robert L. Spragins.
- Vice Admiral Joseph K. Taussig, Jr., USN.
- Colonel Frank Tompkins, career Army officer and recipient of the Distinguished Service Cross.
- Master Henry F. Page, age ten. Rescued another boy in Shenevus, New York on 8 August 1887.
- Miss Marie D. Parsons, age ten. She rescued a man and his seven-year-old daughter on 7 July 1883 in Gardiners Bay off Long Island, New York.
- Emlen Tunnell, National Football League Hall of Fame member (who played for New York Giants and Green Bay Packers American football Teams) posthumously awarded, in 2011, for heroic actions saving two fellow Coast Guardsmen during World War 2
- Bobby Brown- third baseman, baseball executive and cardiologist
- Boatswain's Mate Second Class Jennifer A. Williamson, USCG - 23 May 2021
- David Christney, coxswain of CCG104, who rescued the crew of USCG helicopter, CG1461, on 29 Feb 1976
- Martin Charles, seaman of CCG104, who rescued the crew of USCG helicopter, CG1461, on 29 Feb 1976
- Clifford Charles, seaman of CCG104, who rescued the crew of USCG helicopter, CG1461, on 29 Feb 1976
- Bob Amos, engineman of CCG104, who rescued the crew of USCG helicopter, CG1461, on 29 Feb 1976
- Edwin C. Cronquist, seaman 2nd class, of USCGC Haida for rescuing a drowning woman at Seattle on 10 April 1925.

=== Other awardees ===
- Lucien M. Clemons, 19 June 1876.
- Hubbard M. Celmons, 19 June 1876.
- A.J. Celmons, 19 June 1876.
- Volunteer crews of the Liverpool and New Brighton lifeboats following wrecking of the Ellen Southard near Liverpool, England, 1877
- J. Schuyler Crosby, 8 June 1877.
- Carl Fosburg, 8 June 1877.
- Philip C. Bleil, New York City Police Department, 4 January 1878.
- Seaman Antoine Williams, USN, 13 March 1879.
- John H. Rapp, 4 March 1882. (Also awarded silver medal.)
- Cabin Steward Fuji Hachitaro, USN, 5 November 1889.
- Captain Cameron Kirkconnell, 2008.
- John Lightbourn, 16 September 1919
- CM2 Thomas T. O'Brien (USN), 14 January 1990, McMurdo Station, Antarctica
- EO1 Brian Demelo (USN), 14 January 1990, McMurdo Station, Antarctica
- BM1 Reece Raxter, awarded 24 June 2022.
- Capt. William Taft Tippett, Ridge, MD, awarded 23 December 1938.
- LTJG Jordan Russell, USCG, awarded 17 November 2026

== See also ==
- Soldier's Medal
- Navy and Marine Corps Medal
- Airman's Medal
- Coast Guard Medal
- Awards and decorations of the United States government
