= USCGC Bernard C. Webber =

US Coast Guard Sentinel-class cutter

- Coast Guard Cutter Bernard C. Webber underway

History

United States
- Name: USCGC Bernard C. Webber
- Namesake: Bernard C. Webber
- Operator: United States Coast Guard
- Builder: Bollinger Shipyards, Lockport, Louisiana
- Launched: April 21, 2011
- Acquired: February 10, 2012
- Commissioned: April 14, 2012
- Home port: Port of Miami, Florida
- Identification: MMSI number: 338926401; Callsign: NPEG; Hull number: WPC-1101
- Motto: Determination heeds no interference
- Status: in active service
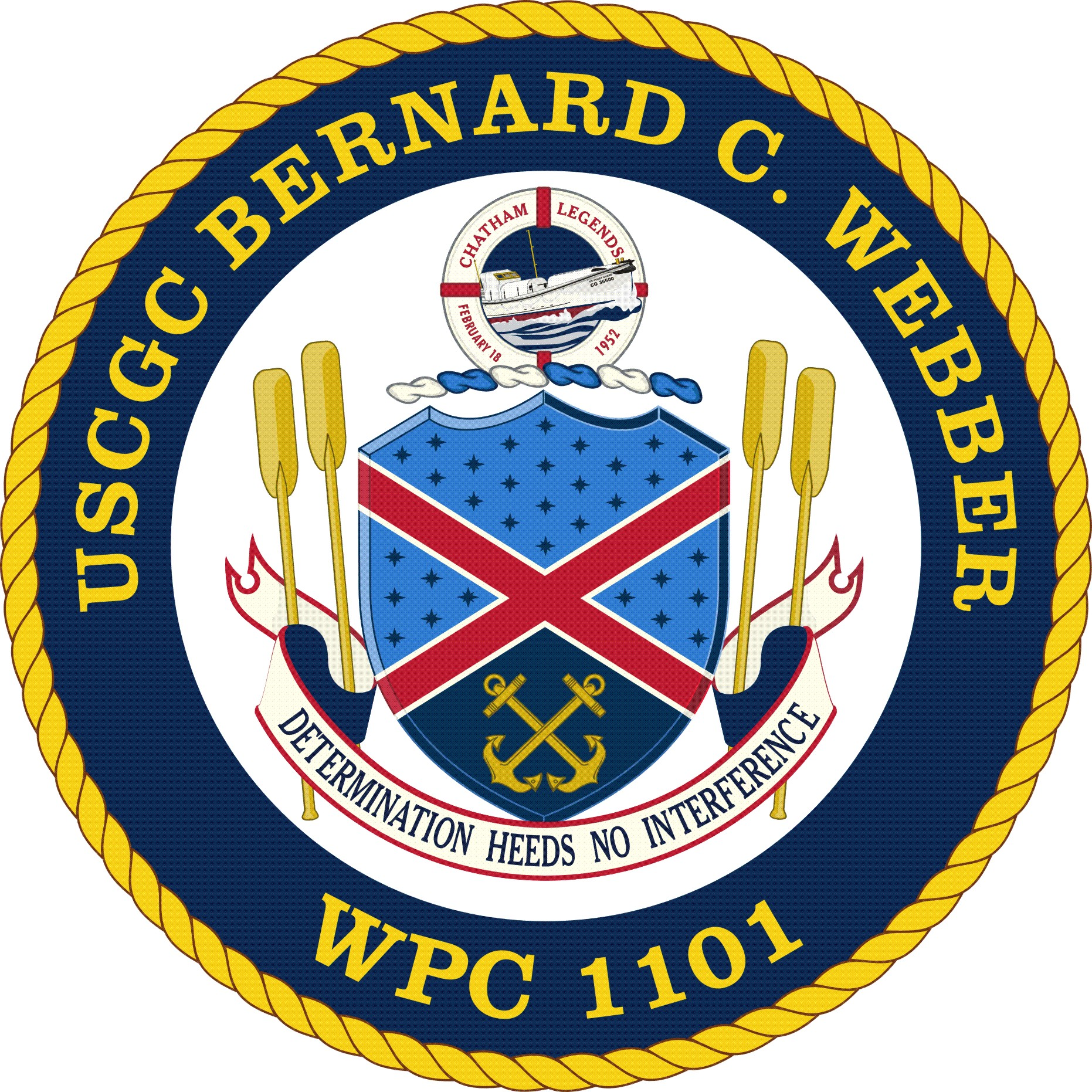
- Badge

General characteristics
- Class & type: Sentinel-class cutter
- Displacement: 353 long tons (359 t)
- Length: 46.8 m (154 ft)
- Beam: 8.11 m (26.6 ft)
- Depth: 2.9 m (9.5 ft)
- Propulsion: 2 × 4,300 kW (5,800 shp); 1 × 75 kW (101 shp) bow thruster
- Speed: 28 knots (52 km/h; 32 mph)
- Range: 2,500 nautical miles (4,600 km; 2,900 mi)
- Endurance: 5 days
- Boats & landing craft carried: 1 × Short Range Prosecutor RHIB
- Complement: 2 officers, 20 crew
- Sensors & processing systems: L-3 C4ISR suite
- Armament: 1 × Mk 38 Mod 2 25 mm automatic gun; 4 × crew-served Browning M2 machine guns

USCGC Bernard C. Webber (WPC-1101) is the first of the United States Coast Guard's 58 Sentinel-class cutters. Like most of her sister ships, she replaced a 110-foot (34 m) Island-class patrol boat. Bernard C. Webber, and the next five vessels in the class, Richard Etheridge, William Flores, Robert Yered, Margaret Norvell, and Paul Clark, are all based in Miami, Florida.

== First of class ==
On September 26, 2008, Bollinger Shipyards in Louisiana was awarded US$88 million to build the prototype first vessel in its class. The Sentinel-class design is from the Netherlands-based Damen Group, and is based on that company's Damen Stan 4708 patrol vessel. The first vessel Bollinger built became Bernard C. Webber, which is the first of 58 planned Sentinel-class cutters to be put into the U.S. Coast Guard fleet to replace their old 110 ft patrol boats (and their unseaworthy 123 ft cutters), starting with the first six based in Miami, then six in Key West, then six in Puerto Rico.

On July 24, 2014, it was announced that the U.S. Coast Guard had exercised a $225 million option at Bollinger Shipyards in Louisiana for construction through 2017 of an additional six Sentinel-class Fast Response Cutters (FRC), bringing the total number of FRCs under contract with Bollinger to 30. On May 4, 2016, Bollinger Shipyards announced that the U.S. Coast Guard awarded it a new contract for building the final 26 Sentinel-class fast-response cutters. That brings to 58 the total number of FRCs that the USCG ordered from Bollinger. Acquiring the 58 cutters is expected to cost the federal government $3.8 billion — an average of about $65 million per cutter.

== Operational history ==
Bernard C. Webber was launched in April 2011. She commenced her sea trials on November 27, 2011. She arrived in her homeport of Miami, Florida, on February 6, 2012. She was commissioned on April 14, 2012, at the Port of Miami, Miami, Florida.

For a week in August 2015 Bernard C. Webber was tasked to host some VIPs, and demonstrate to them the ability of the Coast Guard to protect the United States' borders.

In November 2015 the cutter cooperated with the Netherlands offshore patrol vessel HNLMS Friesland in the interception of a large quantity of illicit drugs, off the coast of the Dominican Republic.

On April 10, 2016, Bernard C. Webber rescued ten individuals from a vessel that capsized off Freetown, Bahamas. The ten individuals were adrift for about six hours, but none of them were injured. Since they were assessed to be migrants, trying to make their way to United States, they were transferred to the custody of the Royal Bahamas Defence Force.

== Namesake ==
Like the other ships of her class Bernard C. Webber is named after a heroic enlisted member of the Coast Guard. Bernard C. Webber was coxswain of the 36-foot (11 m) wooden Coast Guard Motor Lifeboat CG 36500 that ventured out in 60-foot (18 m) seas to rescue men from the stricken T2 tanker SS Pendleton that had broken in two during a Winter storm off Chatham, Massachusetts on February 18, 1952. The rescue of the survivors of the shipwrecked Pendleton is considered one of the most daring rescues of the United States Coast Guard.

The story of the Pendleton rescue has been made into a motion picture titled The Finest Hours.
