= USCGC Richard Etheridge =

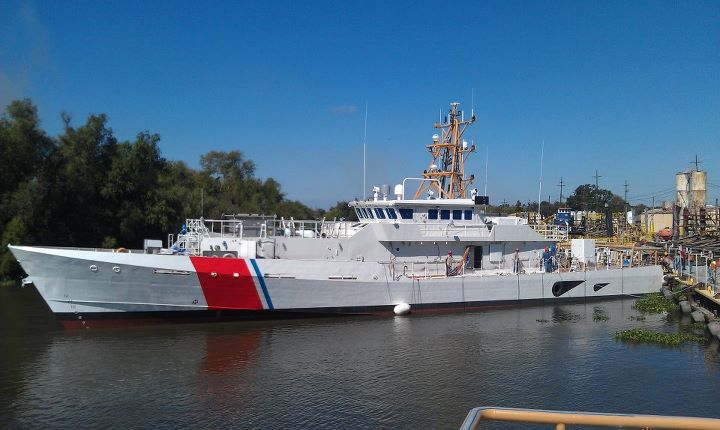
- Pre-commissioning photo of the future USCGC Richard Etheridge, moving to another mooring as her final equipment is added.

History

United States
- Name: USCGC Richard Etheridge
- Namesake: Richard Etheridge
- Operator: United States Coast Guard
- Builder: Bollinger Shipyards, Lockport, Louisiana
- Launched: August 18, 2011
- Acquired: May 26, 2012
- Commissioned: August 3, 2012
- Identification: MMSI number: 338926402; Callsign: NJFB; Hull number: WPC-1102
- Motto: In behalf of humanity
- Status: in active service
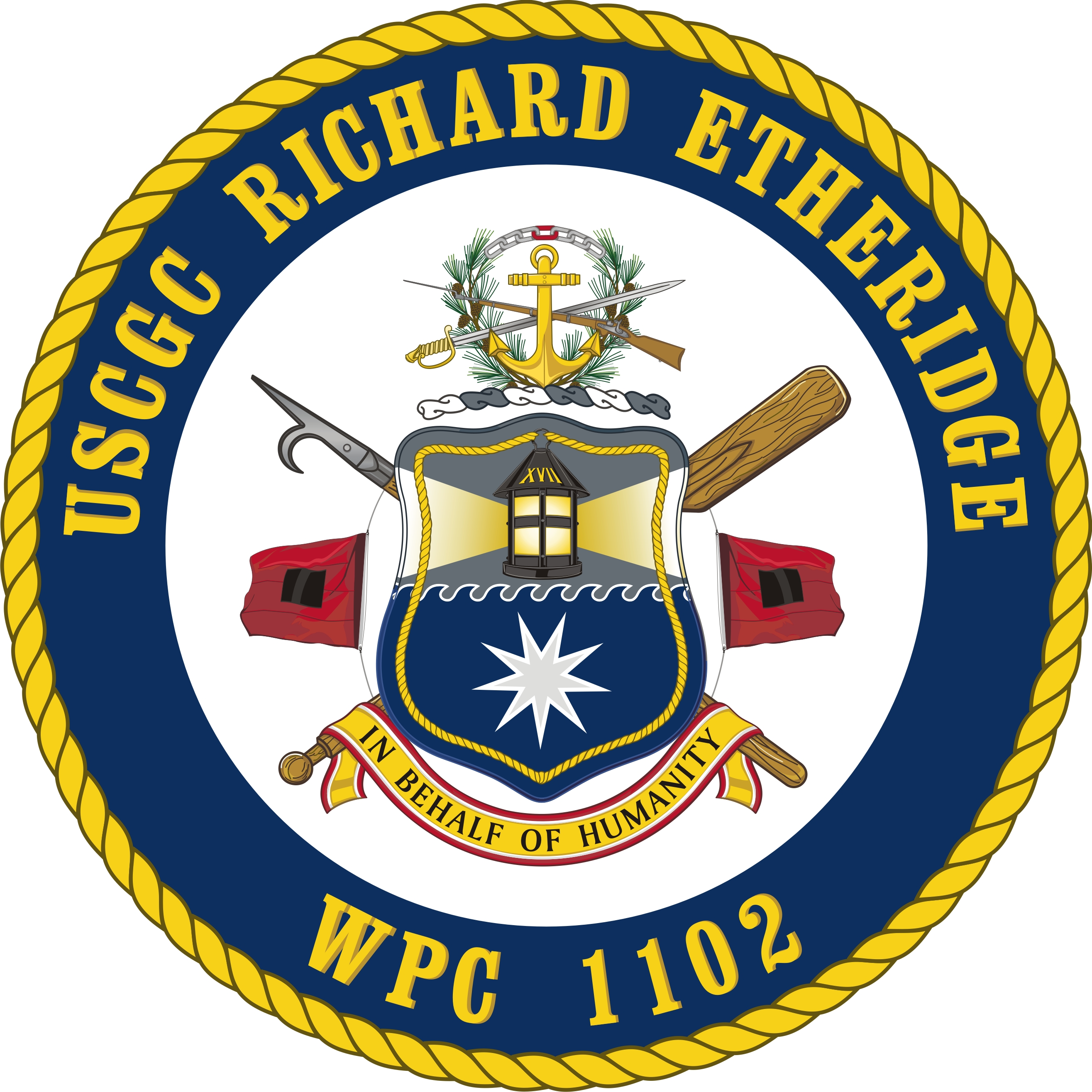
- Badge

General characteristics
- Class & type: Sentinel-class cutter
- Displacement: 353 long tons (359 t)
- Length: 46.8 m (154 ft)
- Beam: 8.11 m (26.6 ft)
- Depth: 2.9 m (9.5 ft)
- Propulsion: 2 × 4,300 kW (5,800 shp); 1 × 75 kW (101 shp) bow thruster
- Speed: 28 knots (52 km/h; 32 mph)
- Range: 2,500 nautical miles (4,600 km; 2,900 mi)
- Endurance: 5 days
- Boats & landing craft carried: 1 × Short Range Prosecutor RHIB
- Complement: 2 officers, 20 crew
- Sensors & processing systems: L-3 C4ISR suite
- Armament: 1 × Mk 38 Mod 2 25 mm automatic gun; 4 × crew-served Browning M2 machine guns

Sister ship Bernard C. Webber during her sea trials.

USCGC Richard Etheridge is the second of the United States Coast Guard's Sentinel-class cutters. Like most of her sister ships she replaced a 110-foot (34 m) Island-class patrol boat. Richard Etheridge was launched in August 2011.

The vessel was officially delivered to the Coast Guard on May 26, 2012, at Key West, Florida, and was commissioned into service in Port Everglades, Florida, on August 3, 2012.

Richard Etheridge, and the first and third vessels in the class, Bernard C. Webber, and William Flores, are all based in Miami, Florida.

Like the other ships of her class, Richard Etheridge is named after an enlisted member of the Coast Guard.

== Operational history ==
On March 18, 2014, Richard Etheridge landed 1,500 pounds (680 kg) of illicit drugs captured as part of Operation Martillo.

=== Namesake ===
Richard Etheridge is named after Keeper Richard Etheridge of the U.S. Life-Saving Service, the first African-American to command a life-saving station. Etheridge led the Pea Island Lifesaving Station crew of six in a daring rescue operation that saved the entire crew of the schooner E.S. Newman, which had become grounded in a treacherous storm in 1896.

== Design ==
The Sentinel-class cutters were designed to replace the shorter 110 feet (34 m) Island-class patrol boats. Richard Etheridge is armed with a remote-control 25 mm Bushmaster autocannon and four, crew-served M2HB .50-caliber machine guns. It has a bow thruster for maneuvering in crowded anchorages and channels. It also has small underwater fins for coping with the rolling and pitching caused by large waves. It is equipped with a stern launching ramp, like the Marine Protector class and the eight failed expanded Island-class cutters. It has a complement of twenty-two crew members. Like the Marine Protector class, and the cancelled extended Island-class cutters, the Sentinel-class cutters deploy the Short Range Prosecutor rigid-hulled inflatable (SRP or RHIB) in rescues and interceptions. According to Marine Log, modifications to the Coast Guard vessels from the Stan 4708 design include an increase in speed from 23 to 28 knots (43 to 52 km/h; 26 to 32 mph), fixed-pitch rather than variable-pitch propellers, stern launch capability, and watertight bulkheads.

Richard Etheridge has an overall length of 153 feet 6 inches (46.79 m), a beam of 25 feet (7.6 m), and a displacement of 325 long tons (330 t; 364 short tons). Its draft is 9 feet 6 inches (2.90 m) and it has a maximum speed of over 28 knots (52 km/h; 32 mph). The Sentinel-class cutters have an endurance of five days and a range of 2,950 nautical miles (3,390 mi; 5,460 km).
