= USCGC Margaret Norvell =

2013 Sentinel-class cutter

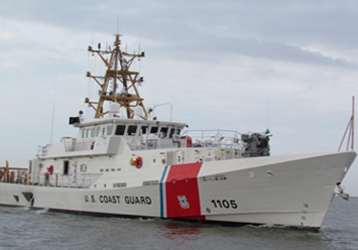
- USCGC Margaret Norvell, delivered to the USCG on March 21, 2013, and commissioned June 1, 2013.

History

United States
- Name: USCGC Margaret Norvell
- Namesake: Margaret Norvell
- Operator: United States Coast Guard
- Builder: Bollinger Shipyards, Lockport, Louisiana
- Launched: January 13, 2013
- Acquired: March 21, 2013
- Commissioned: June 1, 2013
- Home port: Miami, Florida
- Identification: MMSI number: 338926405; Callsign: NFPE; Hull number: WPC-1105
- Motto: True steady unfailing
- Status: in active service
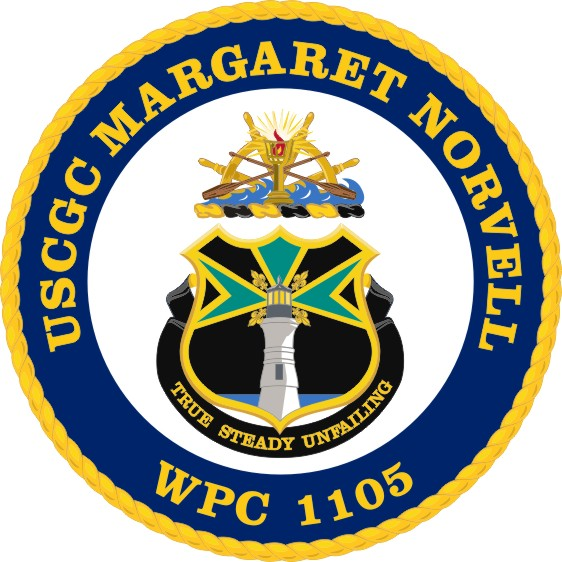
- Badge

General characteristics
- Class & type: Sentinel-class cutter
- Displacement: 353 long tons (359 t)
- Length: 46.8 m (154 ft)
- Beam: 8.11 m (26.6 ft)
- Depth: 2.9 m (9.5 ft)
- Propulsion: 2 × 4,300 kW (5,800 shp); 1 × 75 kW (101 shp) bow thruster
- Speed: 28 knots (52 km/h; 32 mph)
- Range: 2,500 nautical miles (4,600 km; 2,900 mi)
- Endurance: 5 days
- Boats & landing craft carried: 1 × Cutter Boat – Over the Horizon RHIB
- Complement: 4 officers, 20 crew
- Sensors & processing systems: L-3 C4ISR suite
- Armament: 1 × Mk 38 Mod 2 25 mm automatic gun; 4 × crew-served Browning M2 machine guns

USCGC Margaret Norvell (WPC-1105) is the fifth Sentinel-class cutter, based at Miami, Florida. She was launched on January 13, 2012, and delivered to the Coast Guard on March 21, 2013. She was commissioned on June 1, 2013. She was commissioned at Mardi Gras World in New Orleans, near where her namesake, Margaret Norvell, staffed a lighthouse for decades.

The Key News reported that Margaret Norvell was in Key West on April 2, 2013, finishing her outfitting.

== Design ==
The Sentinel-class cutters were designed to replace the shorter 110-foot (34 m) Island-class patrol boats. Margaret Norvell is armed with a remote-control 25 mm Bushmaster autocannon and four crew-served M2HB .50-caliber machine guns. She has a bow thruster for maneuvering in crowded anchorages and channels. She also has small underwater fins for coping with the rolling and pitching caused by large waves. She is equipped with a stern launching ramp, like the Marine Protector class and the eight failed expanded Island-class cutters. She has a complement of twenty-two crew members. Like the Marine Protector class and the cancelled extended Island-class cutters, the Sentinel-class cutters originally deployed the Short Range Prosecutor rigid-hulled inflatable (SRP or RHIB) in rescues and interceptions. The current outfit is the Cutter Boat - Over The Horizon (CB-OTH-IV), the same as deployed on the Reliance, Famous, and Legend classes of cutters. According to Marine Log, modifications to the Coast Guard vessels from the Stan 4708 design include an increase in speed from 23 to 28 knots (43 to 52 km/h; 26 to 32 mph), fixed-pitch rather than variable-pitch propellers, stern launch capability, and watertight bulkheads.

Margaret Norvell has an overall length of 153 feet 6 inches (46.79 m), a beam of 25 feet (7.6 m), and a displacement of 325 long tons (330 t; 364 short tons). Her draft is 9 feet 6 inches (2.90 m) and she has a maximum speed of over 28 knots (52 km/h; 32 mph). The Sentinel-class cutters have an endurance of five days and a range of 2,950 nautical miles (3,390 mi; 5,460 km).

== Operational history ==
In October 2013, while her crew were undergoing training in Key West, Margaret Norvell intercepted two individuals who were using jet-skis, out in the Gulf Stream, whose craft was equipped with GPS navigation devices, extra water and extra fuel. The operators were stopped after a 45-minute chase, and were charged with "failure to heave to." The men were first seen heading south, and it was believed they were headed towards Cuba.

On December 6, 2015, the barge Columbia Elizabeth was proceeding to Puerto Rico with a cargo of shipping containers, when crew members noticed some were missing. She was diverted to the Port of Palm Beach where it was determined 25 shipping containers were missing. Margaret Norvell, and other elements of the Coast Guard, were assigned to look for the missing containers.

In January 2019, the Margaret Norvell was deployed to Puerto Rico for Operation Unified Resolve. During this deployment, the cutter interdicted $3 million worth of cocaine and apprehended 4 suspected smugglers.

From August to October, the Margaret Norvell conducted a 55-day patrol throughout the Southeastern United States. As Hurricane Dorian approached in late August and early September 2019, Margaret Norvell and other cutters pre-staged in Key West for post-storm operations. Once the storm had passed, the Margaret Norvell conducted Task Force-Southeastern United States (TF-SEUS) offshore SAR and port security operations under the tactical control of USCGC Dauntless. On September 29, 2019, the Margaret Norvell assisted the Motor Yacht Viking Lady, disabled and adrift 39 nautical miles north of Freeport, Bahamas. While towing the Viking Lady to commercial salvage near Fort Lauderdale, the seas began to increase due to the effects of Hurricane Lorenzo. After sunset, one of the Viking Lady crew members fell overboard due to the seas, and a small boat crew from Margaret Norvell rescued the person in the water. After transferring the vessel to commercial salvage, the Margaret Norvell received two Haitian migrants for transfer to the Bahamian Immigration Department. The next day, the Margaret Norvell assisted a Bahamian-flagged fishing vessel that was adrift south of Bimini. They towed the vessel near Bimini and transferred the tow to the Royal Bahamas Defense Force.

In November 2019, the Margaret Norvell and Kathleen Moore deployed in support of Commander, US Navy FOURTH Fleet for Operation Enduring Promise 2019. The two cutters provided waterborne force protection during the US Naval Hospital Ship Comfort's medical mission to Haiti. Later that month, Margaret Norvell and HMBS Cascarilla apprehended the F/V Gerchard II, a Dominican-flagged vessel illegally fishing in Bahamian waters with an estimated $250,000 of catch on board.

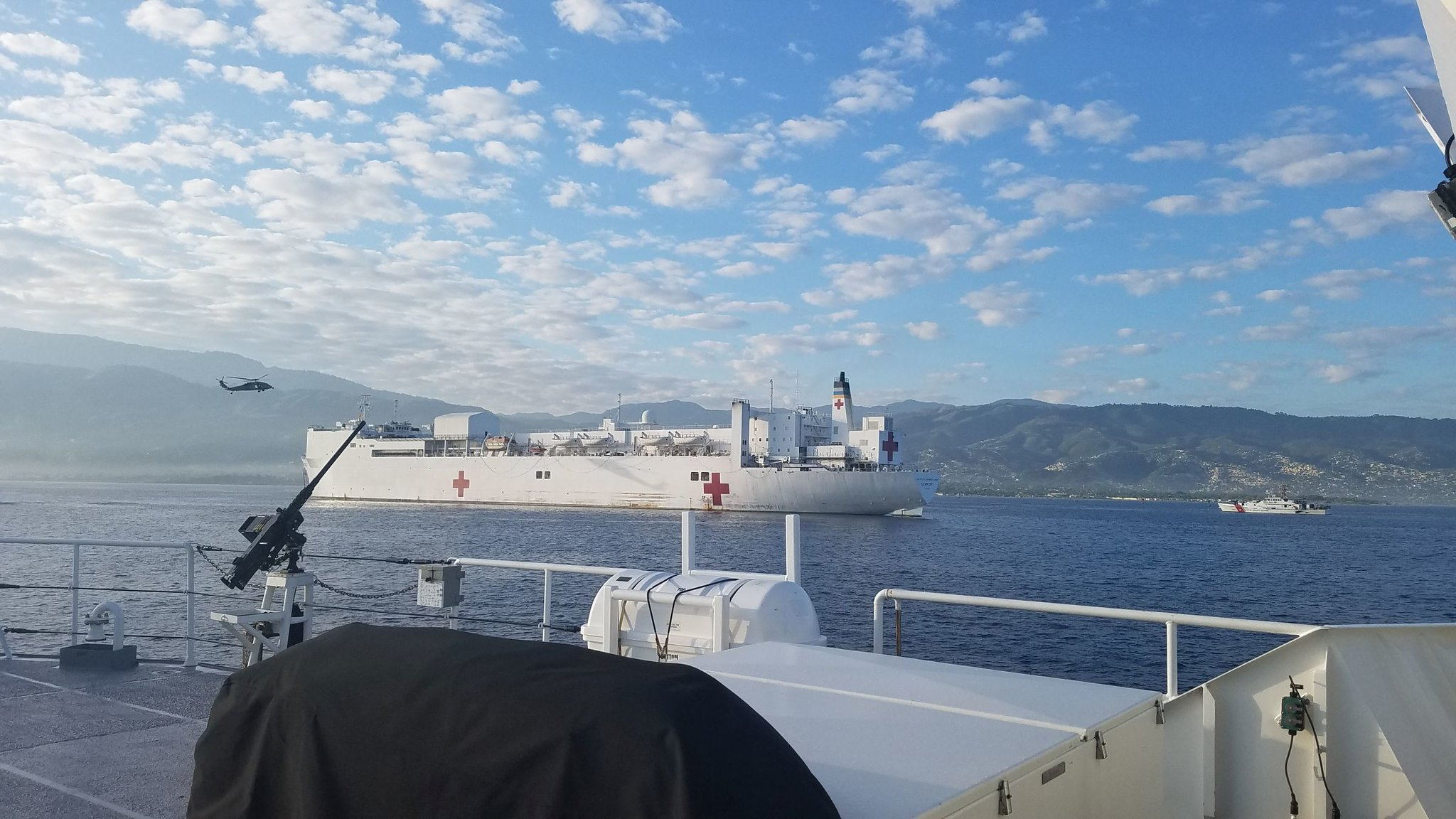
The USCGC Margaret Norvell (WPC 1105) and USCGC Kathleen Moore (WPC 1109) escort the USNS Comfort (T-AH 20) into Port-au-Prince, Haiti for Operation Enduring Promise 2019.

== Namesake ==
The vessel is named after Margaret Norvell, who served as a lighthouse keeper for the United States Lighthouse Service from 1891 to 1932.
