= Sentinel-class cutter =

United States Coast Guard cutter class

Sentinel class
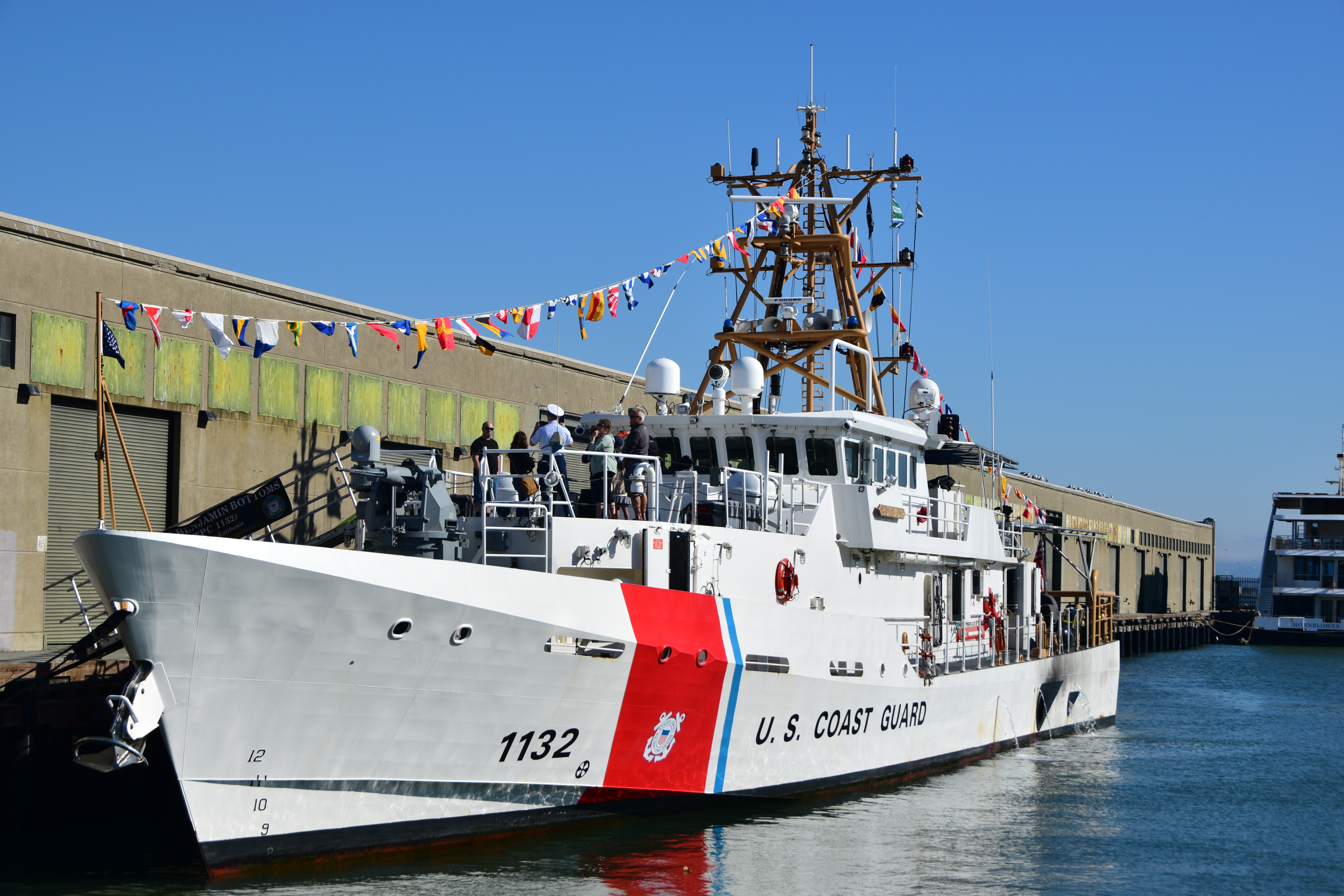
- The USCGC Benjamin Bottoms at San Francisco

Class overview
- Name: Sentinel class
- Operators: United States Coast Guard
- Planned: 77
- Completed: 64
- Active: 62
- Retired: 1

General characteristics
- Type: Cutter
- Displacement: 353 long tons (359 t)
- Length: 46.8 m (153 ft 7 in)
- Beam: 8.11 m (26 ft 7 in)
- Depth: 2.9 m (9 ft 6 in)
- Propulsion: 2 × 4,300 kW (5,800 shp) MTU diesel engines; 1 × 75 kW (101 shp) bow thruster
- Speed: 28+ knots
- Endurance: 5 days, 2,500 nautical miles (4,600 km; 2,900 mi); Designed to be on patrol 2,500 hours per year
- Boats & landing craft carried: 1 × Cutter Boat – Over the Horizon – jet-drive
- Complement: 4 officers, 20 crew
- Sensors & processing systems: L-3 C4ISR suite; AN/SPS-78 surface search and navigation radar; AN/SPS-50 surface search radar; RADA RPS-42 MHR air search radar; AN/APX-123(V)1 IFF (ship automation provided by MTU Callosum)
- Armament: 1 × Mk 38 Mod 2 25 mm machine gun system (and 4 × crew-served Browning M2 machine guns on some cutters)

The Sentinel-class cutter, also known as the Fast Response Cutter (FRC) due to its program name, is part of the United States Coast Guard's Deepwater program. At 154 feet (46.8 m), it is similar to but larger than the 123-foot (37 m) lengthened 1980s-era Island-class patrol boats that it replaces. At least 77 vessels are to be built by the Louisiana-based firm Bollinger Shipyards based on Netherlands-based Damen Group's Stan 4708 patrol vessel.

== Planning and acquisition ==
In March 2007, newly appointed USCG Commandant Thad Allen announced that the USCG had withdrawn a contract from Lockheed Martin and Northrop Grumman for the construction of an initial flawed design of what would eventually become the Sentinel class. Allen announced that instead of the initial high-technology design, Bollinger would build vessels based on an existing design, and the new program would focus more on existing "off-the-shelf" technology.

The design chosen was largely based on the Damen Stan 4708 patrol vessels from the Netherlands firm the Damen Group. The South African government operates three similar 154-foot Lillian Ngoyi-class vessels for environmental and fishery patrols.

In September 2008, Bollinger Shipyards in Lockport, Louisiana, was awarded US$88 million to build the prototype first vessel in its class. That prototype was the first of a projected series of 46.8-meter (154 ft) cutters. In September 2008, the series was expected to comprise a maximum of 24 to 34 cutters but by the time the prototype cutter, which became USCGC Bernard C. Webber, entered service in 2012, the planned number of Sentinel-class cutters had grown to 58. They replaced the 37 remaining aging, 1980s-era 110 ft Island-class patrol boats.

All Sentinel-class vessels are named after enlisted Coast Guard heroes. Bernard C. Webber was launched in April 2011 and commissioned in April 2012 at the Port of Miami. She and five sister ships are stationed in Miami, Florida. The second cohort of six vessels is homeported in Key West, Florida. The third cohort of six vessels is homeported in San Juan, Puerto Rico. As of October 2024, the USCG plans to station most Sentinel-class cutters in the United States, but a cohort of six vessels are stationed with Patrol Forces Southwest Asia (PATFORSWA) in the Persian Gulf. As many as six more are planned to be stationed in the Indo-Pacific region.

A second contract was awarded on December 15, 2009, for an additional three Sentinel-class cutters at a cost of US$141 million. By April 2010, the USCG's contract with Bollinger allowed for the order of up to 34 Sentinel-class cutters at a cost of up to US$1.5 billion. Even then, the USCG was planning to build a total of 58 Sentinel-class cutters.

In September 2013, Marine Link reported that the USCG had placed orders with Bollinger Shipyards for additional cutters, bringing the total number of cutters ordered to 30.

In July 2014, the USCG announced it had exercised a $225 million option at Bollinger Shipyards for construction through 2017 of an additional six Sentinel-class FRCs, bringing the total number under contract with Bollinger to 30. Later, that number was increased to 32 FRCs.

In May 2016, Bollinger Shipyards announced that the USCG had awarded it a new contract for building the final 26 Sentinel-class FRCs. That brought to 58 the total number of FRCs that the USCG ordered from Bollinger. Acquiring the 58 cutters was expected to cost the federal government $3.8 billion — an average of about $65 million per cutter.

By June 2016, 38 of the projected 58 FRCs had been ordered and 17 were in service. The Miami and Key West cohorts were complete. The 18th FRC, Joseph Tezanos, was delivered to the USCG in Key West in June 2016 en route to completing the San Juan cohort.

On August 9, 2018, the USCG exercised its contract option to order six more Sentinel-class cutters, the 45th through 50th cutters of that class. With this order, the total value of orders under the contract grew to almost US$929 million. On August 21, the 30th boat, Robert Ward, was delivered.

On July 31, 2019, the USCG exercised its contract option to order another six Sentinel-class cutters. These would be the 51st through 56th cutters of that class. With this order, the total value of orders under the contract grew to about US$1.23 billion. Under the contract, the USCG could order as many as 58 cutters, at a total cost of US$1.42 billion. The six new cutters were expected to be delivered starting in late 2022 and ending in late 2023.

In September 2020, the Coast Guard announced it was ordering four more FRCs from Bollinger, to be delivered in 2024. These would be the 56th through 60th cutters of that class. At that time, 40 FRCs had been delivered and 38 had been commissioned. The Coast Guard had recently modified its contract with Bollinger to increase the maximum number of cutters that could be ordered under the contract to 64. The modified contract had a potential value of US$1.74 billion.

In 2017, the Coast Guard announced that two FRCs would be stationed in Astoria, Oregon, starting in 2021. In 2018, the Coast Guard announced four more would be stationed in San Pedro, California, in 2018 and 2019. Also in 2018, the USCG revealed plans to eventually homeport a total of six FRCs in Alaska, with one cutter in Sitka, one in Seward, and two in Kodiak, joining two already operating from Ketchikan. Boston, Massachusetts, and St. Petersburg, Florida, would eventually be FRC homeports.

In June 2019, the United States House Committee on Armed Services approved a requirement for the U.S. Navy (USN) to study the possibility of buying versions of the FRC to be based in Bahrain.

In 2019, Lieutenant Commander Collin Fox (USN), and columnist David Axe suggested that when the USN started to develop unmanned patrol ships to replace the Cyclone class, which are similar in size to the Sentinel class, the hulls and other elements of the robot ships would be based on the Sentinels, and built in the same factory.

In August 2021, the USCG exercised its option to order four more Sentinel-class cutters—the 61st through 64th—from Bollinger, which planned to build the ships at its Lockport, Louisiana, facility and deliver the first of the four vessels in the fall of 2024 and the last in the summer of 2025.

In 2022, the USCG awarded a $30 million contract to install a fixed pier and two floating docks to accommodate FRCs at East Tongue Point in Oregon. The first new cutter was expected to arrive at Astoria, Oregon, in March 2024 rather than in 2021 as originally planned.

In March 2022, President Joe Biden signed the Consolidated Appropriations Act for Fiscal Year 2022, which provided $130 million in funding for two additional FRCs, bringing the total number to 66. In August 2022, the USCG exercised its contract option for the first of these additional cutters, to be delivered by Bollinger in 2025. This order expanded the total value of the Phase 2 contract with Bollinger Shipyards to US$1.8 billion.

In March 2024, a Congressional Research Service report revealed that the USCG's long-term procurement plan called for the purchase of up to 71 FRCs. Six of the new cutters would be deployed to the Indo-Pacific region for engagement with allies and partner countries.

On May 8, 2024, the USCG exercised a contract option for two additional FRCs, bringing the total vessels built by or under contract with Bollinger to 67 and the total value of the Phase 2 contract to about US$2 billion. The two new FRCs are expected to be delivered in fiscal year 2028.

On September 10, 2025, the USCG announced that it had exercised a contract option for 10 additional FRCs, increasing the number ordered from Bollinger from 67 to 77. Congress had authorized US$1 billion for this purpose in the One Big Beautiful Bill Act. These new FRCs are expected to be delivered starting in fiscal year 2028.

On July 16, 2026, the USCG announced that the six vessels comprising the Expeditionary Cutter Squadron that makes up PATFORSWA, which previously was forward deployed to Bahrain, will instead operate from Guam and the Pacific Islands.

== Mission ==
The vessels perform various USCG missions which include ports, waterways, and coastal security, defense operations, maritime law enforcement (drug/migrant interdiction and other law enforcement), search and rescue, marine safety, and environment protection.

== Design and construction ==
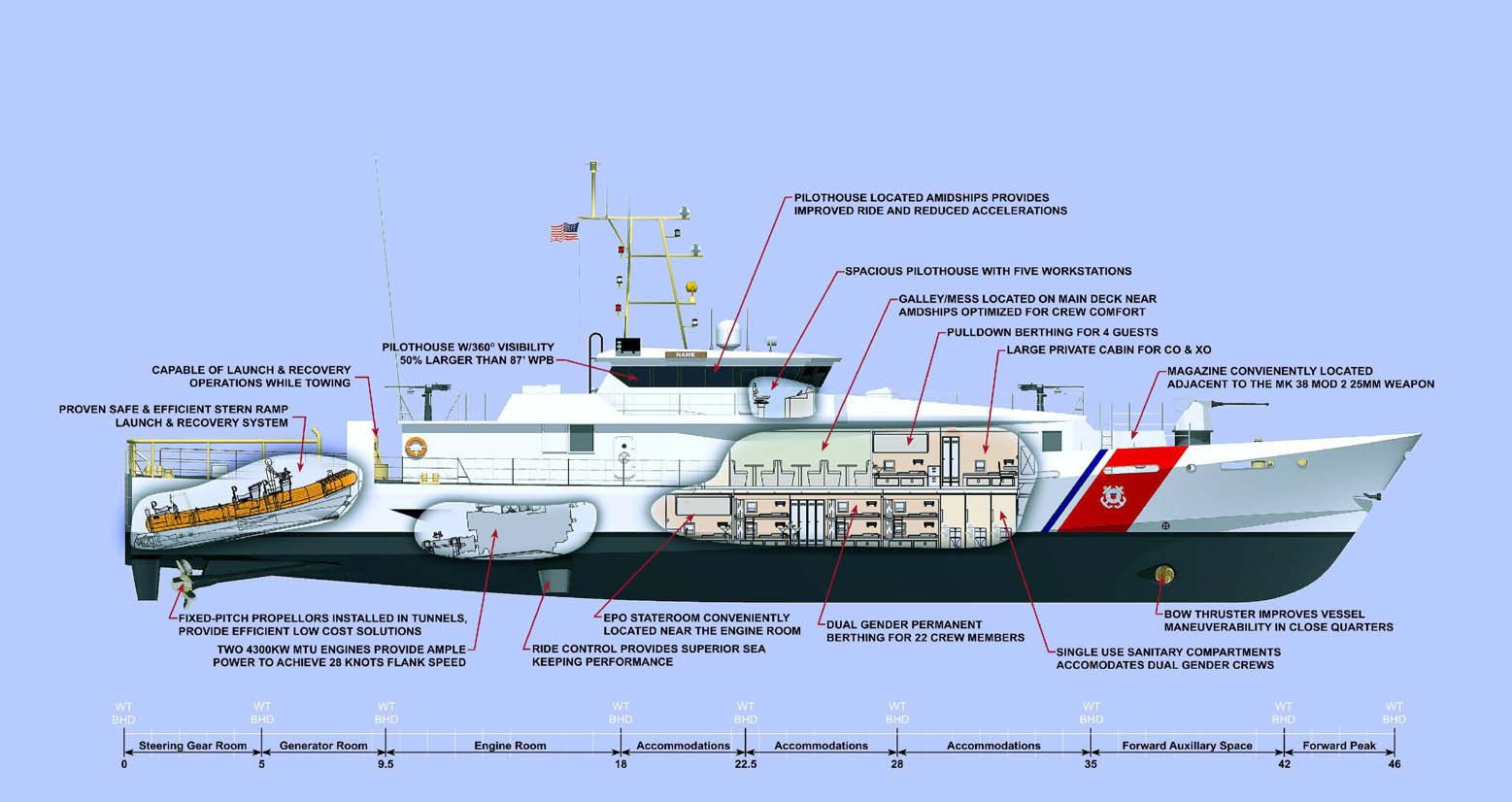
A graphic of USCG Sentinel-class cutter modifications made to the Damen Stan 4708 patrol vessel design

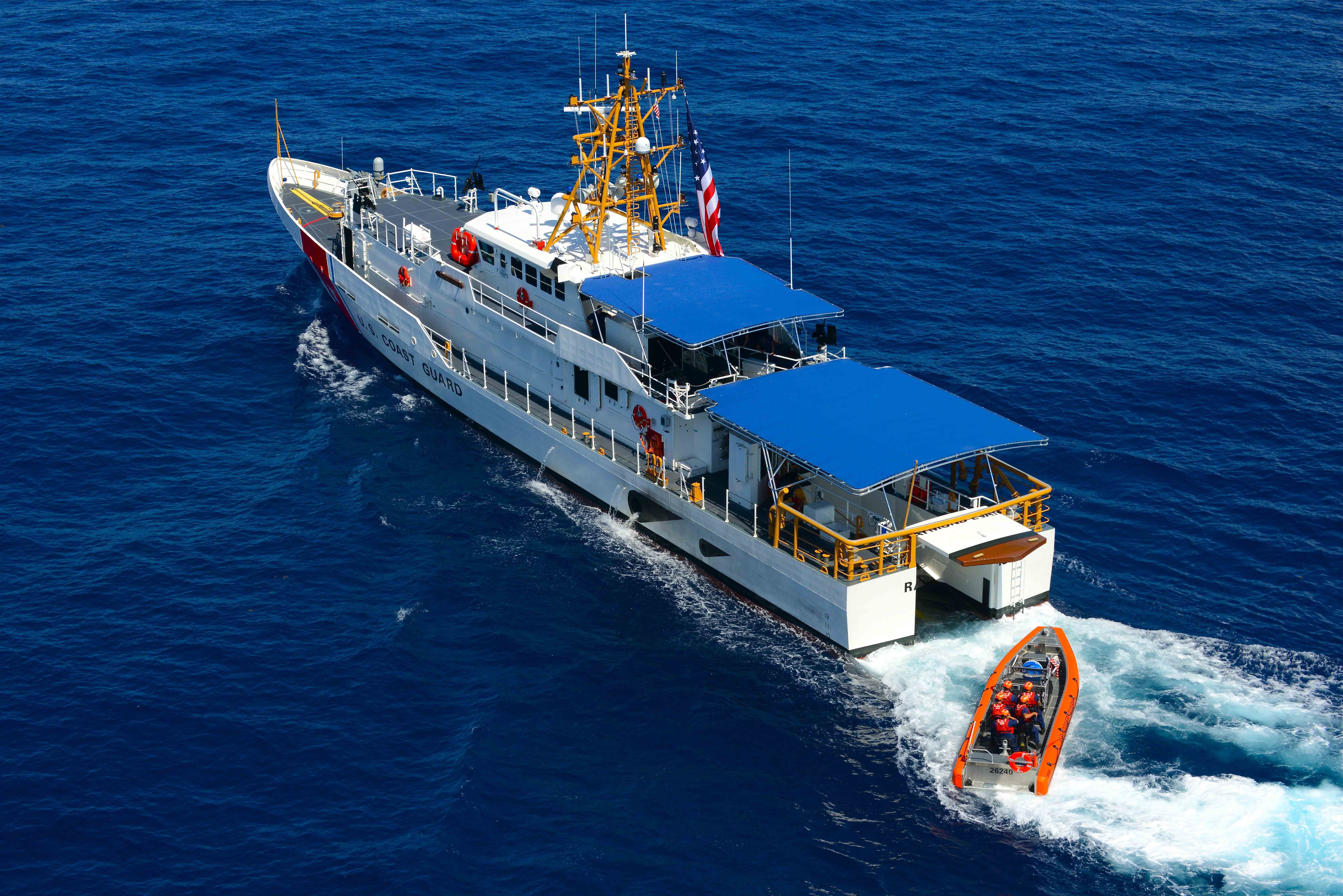
USCGC Raymond Evans, the 10th Sentinel-class cutter

Vessels are armed with a remote-control Mark 38 25mm machine gun system and four crew-served .50-caliber (12.7mm) M2HB heavy machine guns. They have a bow thruster for maneuvering in crowded anchorages and channel and small underwater fins for coping with the rolling and pitching caused by large waves. They are equipped with a stern launching ramp, like the Marine Protector-class and the eight failed expanded Island-class cutters. They are manned by a crew of 22. The FRC deploys the 26-foot (7.9 m) Cutter Boat - Over the Horizon for rescues and interceptions.

Modifications to the USCG vessels from the Stan 4708 design include an increase in speed from 23 to 28 knots (43 to 52 km/h; 26 to 32 mph), fixed-pitch rather than variable-pitch propellers, stern launch capability, and watertight bulkheads. The vessels are built to ABS High Speed Naval Craft rules and some parts of the FRC also comply to ABS Naval Vessel Rules. The vessels meet Naval Sea Systems Command standards for two-compartment-damaged stability and meet the intact and damage stability and reserve buoyancy requirements in accordance with the Procedures Manual for Stability Analyses of U.S. Navy Small Craft.

The vessels have space, weight, and power reserved for future requirements, which includes weapons and their systems. The cutters have a reduced radar cross-section through shaping. The bridge is equipped with a handheld device that allows crew members to remotely control the ship's functions, including rudder movement and docking.

In February 2013, the Department of Homeland Security requested tenders from third-party firms to independently inspect the cutters during their construction and performance trials.

At the September 2022 commissioning of USCGC Douglas Denman, it was announced that she had several upgrades compared to the two cutters deployed to Ketchikan, Alaska, six years previously. These include an improved bow thruster and radar system and the addition of a forward-looking infrared camera. Though initially stationed at Ketchikan, Douglas Denman will eventually be homeported at Sitka when port infrastructure improvements have been completed.

=== Crew accommodation ===
The Sentinel-class cutters are able to accommodate mixed-gender crews. When USCGC Rollin Fritch was commissioned, a profile in The Philadelphia Inquirer asserted off-duty crew members had access to satellite television broadcasts. Vessels are also equipped with a desalination unit.

== Ships ==
Name	Hull number	Delivered	Commissioned	Home port	Status
Bernard C. Webber	WPC-1101	April 21, 2011	April 14, 2012	Miami, Florida	Active service
Richard Etheridge	WPC-1102	August 18, 2011	August 3, 2012	Miami, Florida	Active service
William Flores	WPC-1103	November 10, 2011	November 3, 2012	Miami, Florida	Active service
Robert Yered	WPC-1104	November 17, 2012	February 15, 2013	Miami, Florida	Active service
Margaret Norvell	WPC-1105	January 13, 2013	June 1, 2013	Miami, Florida	Active service
Paul Clark	WPC-1106	May 18, 2013	August 24, 2013	Miami, Florida	Active service
Charles David Jr.	WPC-1107	August 17, 2013	November 16, 2013	Key West, Florida	Active service
Charles Sexton	WPC-1108	December 10, 2013	March 8, 2014	Key West, Florida	Active service
Kathleen Moore	WPC-1109	March 28, 2014	May 10, 2014	Key West, Florida	Active service
Raymond Evans (Note: Originally was to be named Joseph Napier, but, in 2013, hull number WPC-1110 was reassigned to the name Raymond Evans to honor recently deceased Commander Raymond Evans. WPC-1115 became Joseph Napier.)	WPC-1110	June 25, 2014	September 6, 2014	Key West, Florida	Active service
William Trump	WPC-1111	November 25, 2014	January 24, 2015	Key West, Florida	Active service
Isaac Mayo	WPC-1112	2015-01-13	2015-03-28	Key West, Florida	Active service
Richard Dixon	WPC-1113	April 14, 2015	June 20, 2015	San Juan, Puerto Rico	Active service
Heriberto Hernandez	WPC-1114	July 30, 2015	October 16, 2015	San Juan, Puerto Rico	Active service
Joseph Napier	WPC-1115	October 20, 2015	January 29, 2016	San Juan, Puerto Rico	Active service
Winslow Griesser	WPC-1116	December 23, 2015	March 11, 2016	San Juan, Puerto Rico	Active service
Donald Horsley	WPC-1117	March 5, 2016	May 20, 2016	San Juan, Puerto Rico	Active service
Joseph Tezanos	WPC-1118	June 22, 2016	August 26, 2016	San Juan, Puerto Rico	Active service
Rollin Fritch	WPC-1119	August 23, 2016	November 19, 2016	Cape May, New Jersey	Active service
Lawrence Lawson	WPC-1120	October 20, 2016	March 18, 2017	Cape May, New Jersey	Active Service
John McCormick	WPC-1121	December 13, 2016	April 12, 2017	Ketchikan, Alaska	Active service
Bailey Barco	WPC-1122	February 7, 2017	June 14, 2017	Ketchikan, Alaska	Active service
Benjamin Dailey	WPC-1123	April 20, 2017	July 4, 2017		Decommissioned after being heavily damaged by fire on December 10, 2021.
Oliver Berry	WPC-1124	June 27, 2017	October 31, 2017	Honolulu, Hawaii	Active service
Jacob Poroo	WPC-1125	September 5, 2017	December 8, 2017	Pascagoula, Mississippi	Active service
Joseph Gerczak	WPC-1126	November 9, 2017	March 9, 2018	Honolulu, Hawaii	Active service
Richard Snyder	WPC-1127	February 8, 2018	April 20, 2018	Atlantic Beach, North Carolina	Active service
Nathan Bruckenthal	WPC-1128	March 29, 2018	July 25, 2018	Atlantic Beach, North Carolina	Active service
Forrest Rednour	WPC-1129	June 7, 2018	November 8, 2018	San Pedro, California	Active service
Robert Ward	WPC-1130	August 21, 2018	March 2, 2019	San Pedro, California	Active service
Terrell Horne	WPC-1131	October 25, 2018	March 22, 2019	San Pedro, California	Active service
Benjamin Bottoms	WPC-1132	January 8, 2019	May 1, 2019	San Pedro, California	Active service
Joseph Doyle	WPC-1133	March 21, 2019	June 8, 2019	San Juan, Puerto Rico	Active service
William Hart	WPC-1134	May 23, 2019	September 26, 2019	Honolulu, Hawaii	Active service
Angela McShan	WPC-1135	August 1, 2019	October 26, 2019	Cape May, New Jersey	Active service
Daniel Tarr	WPC-1136	November 7, 2019	January 10, 2020	Galveston, Texas	Active service
Edgar Culbertson	WPC-1137	February 6, 2020	June 11, 2020	Galveston, Texas	Active service
Harold Miller	WPC-1138	April 2, 2020	July 15, 2020	Galveston, Texas	Active service
Myrtle Hazard	WPC-1139	May 28, 2020	July 29, 2021	Santa Rita, Guam	Active service
Oliver Henry	WPC-1140	July 30, 2020	July 29, 2021	Santa Rita, Guam	Active service
Charles Moulthrope	WPC-1141	October 22, 2020	January 21, 2021	Manama, Bahrain	Active service
Robert Goldman	WPC-1142	December 21, 2020	March 12, 2021	Manama, Bahrain	Active service
Frederick Hatch	WPC-1143	February 10, 2021	July 29, 2021	Santa Rita, Guam	Active service
Glen Harris	WPC-1144	April 22, 2021	August 6, 2021	Manama, Bahrain	Active service
Emlen Tunnell	WPC-1145	July 1, 2021	October 15, 2021	Manama, Bahrain	Active service
John Scheuerman	WPC-1146	October 22, 2021	February 23, 2022	Manama, Bahrain	Active service
Clarence Sutphin Jr.	WPC-1147	January 6, 2022	April 21, 2022	Manama, Bahrain	Active service
Pablo Valent	WPC-1148	March 17, 2022	May 11, 2022	St. Petersburg, Florida	Active service
Douglas Denman	WPC-1149	May 26, 2022	September 28, 2022	First Ketchikan, then Sitka, Alaska	Active service
William Chadwick	WPC-1150	August 4, 2022	November 10, 2022	Boston, Massachusetts	Active service
Warren Deyampert	WPC-1151	December 22, 2022	March 30, 2023	Boston, Massachusetts	Active service
Maurice Jester	WPC-1152	March 2, 2023	June 2, 2023	Boston, Massachusetts	Active service
John Patterson	WPC-1153	May 11, 2023	August 10, 2023	Boston, Massachusetts	Active service
William Sparling	WPC-1154	July 20, 2023	October 19, 2023	Boston, Massachusetts	Active service
Melvin Bell	WPC-1155	November 16, 2023	March 28, 2024	Boston, Massachusetts	Active service
David Duren	WPC-1156	March 14, 2024	June 27, 2024	Astoria, Oregon	Active service
Florence Finch	WPC-1157	June 13, 2024	October 24, 2024	Astoria, Oregon	Active service
John Witherspoon	WPC-1158	November 7, 2024	April 3, 2025	Kodiak, Alaska	Active service
Earl Cunningham	WPC-1159	March 6, 2025	August 11, 2025	Kodiak, Alaska	Active service
Frederick Mann	WPC-1160	June 16, 2025	February 13, 2026	First Kodiak, then Seward, Alaska	Active service
Olivia Hooker	WPC-1161	October 23, 2025	January 22, 2026	Pascagoula, Mississippi	Active service
Vincent Danz	WPC-1162	February 26, 2026	May 22, 2026	Santa Rita, Guam	Active service
Jeffrey Palazzo	WPC-1163	June 11, 2026	September 12, 2026	Santa Rita, Guam	Active service
Marvin Perrett	WPC-1164	September 10, 2026	2026	San Juan, Puerto Rico	Sea trials
Frank DeVita	WPC-1165	2026	December 2026		Under construction
TBD	WPC-1166	2028			Under contract
TBD	WPC-1167	2028			Under contract
TBD	WPC-1168				Planned
TBD	WPC-1169				Planned
TBD	WPC-1170				Planned
TBD	WPC-1171				Planned
TBD	WPC-1172				Authorized
TBD	WPC-1173				Authorized
TBD	WPC-1174				Authorized
TBD	WPC-1175				Authorized
TBD	WPC-1176				Authorized
TBD	WPC-1177				Authorized

== Operational histories ==
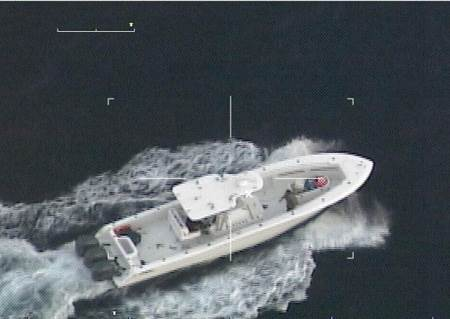
Video was released when USCGC William Trump conducted a 20-hour pursuit of a high-speed 35 ft (11 m) center console boat stolen from Fort Myers, Florida, in December 2015.

Press coverage of the vessels' operational histories suggests they have been effective at interdicting refugees using overloaded small boats, as well as effective at capturing drug smugglers.

The cutters have intercepted smugglers carrying large shipments of drugs. In February 2017 Joseph Napier intercepted a shipment of over four tons of cocaine, reported to be the largest drug-bust in the Atlantic Ocean since 1999.

Cutters are also given tasks like looking for shipping containers full of toxic cargo that have fallen from container ships, as USCGC Margaret Norvell did in December 2015, when 25 containers fell from the barge Columbia Elizabeth. Similarly, Charles Sexton helped search for the freighter El Faro when she was lost at sea during Hurricane Joaquin in October 2015.

In 2018 and 2019 Oliver Berry and Joseph Gerczak made voyages beyond the design range, on missions from Hawaii to the Marshall Islands and American Samoa. Both voyages took nine days.

In August 2022, one of the ships in the Sentinel class, Oliver Henry, was stuck in the Solomon Islands after the country's government failed to respond to a fuel request.

In February 2024, Clarence Sutphin Jr. intercepted a shipment of weaponry on its way to the Houthi militia in the Red Sea.

== Namesakes ==
Charles "Skip" W. Bowen, who was then the Master Chief Petty Officer of the Coast Guard, is credited with leading the initiative of naming the vessels after enlisted rank individuals who served heroically in the Coast Guard or one of its precursor services. Originally, the first vessel of the class was to be named USCGC Sentinel.

In October 2010 the Coast Guard named the first fourteen individuals the vessels will be named after, and has provided biographies of them. They are: Bernard C. Webber, Richard Etheridge, William Flores, Robert Yered, Margaret Norvell, Paul Clark, Charles David Jr, Charles Sexton, Kathleen Moore, Joseph Napier, William Trump, Isaac Mayo, Richard Dixon, Heriberto Hernandez. A second group of eleven names was announced on April 2, 2014.

In 2013 the name of Joseph Napier was reassigned to WPC-1115 when WPC-1110 was named after the recently deceased Commander Raymond Evans. The other ten new namesakes were: Winslow W. Griesser, Richard H. Patterson, Joseph Tezanos, Rollin A. Fritch, Lawrence O. Lawson, John F. McCormick, Bailey T. Barco, Benjamin B. Dailey, Donald R. Horsley, and Jacob L. A. Poroo. The 17th cutter (ex-USCGC Richard Patterson) was renamed as Donald Horsley after request of the Patterson Family, and the 24th cutter (ex-USCGC Donald Horsley) then was renamed as Oliver Berry.

In July 2014, Coast Guard Commandant Paul Zukunft announced that the Coast Guard would name an additional cutter after Senior Chief Petty Officer Terrell Horne, the first Coast Guard member to be murdered in the line of duty since 1927.

In February 2015, the Coast Guard publicized ten more names tentatively assigned to cutters 26 through 35. They were: Joseph Gerczak, Richard T. Snyder, Nathan Bruckenthal, Forrest O. Rednour, Robert G. Ward, Terrell Horne III, Benjamin A. Bottoms, Joseph O. Doyle, William C. Hart, and Oliver F. Berry.

In December 2017, the Coast Guard announced the names of the 35th through 54th cutters. The twenty namesakes are: Angela McShan, Daniel Tarr, Edgar Culbertson, Harold Miller, Myrtle Hazard, Oliver Henry, Charles Moulthrope, Robert Goldman, Frederick Hatch, Glen Harris, Emlen Tunnell, John Scheuerman, Clarence Sutphin, Pablo Valent, Douglas Denman, William Chadwick, Warren Deyampert, Maurice Jester, John Patterson, and William Sparling. The 35th cutter (ex-USCGC Oliver Berry) is to be named as Angela McShan since the 24th cutter (ex-USCGC Donald Horsley) was renamed as Oliver Berry.

In October 2019, the Coast Guard named the namesakes of cutters 55 through 64. They are: Melvin Bell, David Duren, Florence Finch, John Witherspoon, Earl Cunningham, Frederick Mann, Olivia Hooker, Vincent Danz, Jeffrey Palazzo, and Marvin Perrett.
