= USCGC Pablo Valent =

Sentinel-Class Fast Response Craft of the United States Coast Guard

History

United States
- Name: Pablo Valent
- Builder: Bollinger Shipyards
- Commissioned: March 2022
- Home port: Coast Guard Station St. Petersburg, Florida
- Status: In service

General characteristics
- Class & type: Sentinel-class cutter
- Displacement: 353 long tons (359 t)
- Length: 154 ft (47 m)
- Beam: 25 ft (7.6 m)
- Draft: 9 ft 6 in (2.90 m)
- Propulsion: 2 × MTU diesel engines
- Range: 2,500 nmi (4,600 km; 2,900 mi)
- Complement: 24
- Armament: 1 × Mk. 38 Mod. 2 25 mm autocannon; 4 × .50-caliber M2 machineguns

USCGC Pablo Valent (WPC-1148) is a 154-foot (47 m) Sentinel-class cutter assigned to Coast Guard Sector North Carolina and has been homeported at Atlantic Beach, North Carolina since June 2026. The cutter was previously assigned to Sector St. Petersburg at the United States Coast Guard station at St. Petersburg, Florida. She is the 48th vessel of her class to enter service and is named after Chief Boatswain's Mate Pablo Valent, who rescued the crew of the schooner Cape Horn during the 1919 Florida Keys hurricane while part of the United States Life-Saving Service.

== Construction ==
Like all vessels of her class, Pablo Valent was constructed at Bollinger Shipyards in Lockport, Louisiana at a cost of roughly $65 million. Her keel was laid in late 2021, and she was delivered to the United States Coast Guard in March 2022. The vessel has an overall length of 154 feet (47 m), a beam of 25 ft (7.6 m), and a draft of 9 ft 6 in (2.90 m). She displaces roughly 350 long tons (360 t) with a maximum speed of 28 knots (52 km/h; 32 mph). She has a service range of nearly 2,500 nautical miles (4,600 km; 2,900 mi) and is crewed by a complement of 24 personnel. Her propulsion is provided by two MTU diesel engines for a total of 11,600 horsepower (8,700 kW). She also features a stern-launch ramp for the vessels Short Range Prosecutor rigid inflatable boat. She is armed with a single Mk 38 Mod 2 25 mm autocannon and four crew operated .50-caliber M2 machine guns. All vessels of the class incorporate C4ISR systems for enhanced command, control, communications, computers, intelligence, surveillance, and reconnaissance.

== Service ==
Since her commissioning in early 2022, she has been stationed at St. Petersburg under U.S. Coast Guard Sector St. Petersburg. She is responsible for providing law enforcement, search-and-rescue (SAR), environmental protection, and drug interdiction missions. Her operating range includes 400 nautical miles (740 km; 460 mi) of Florida's west coast as well as the Port of St. Petersburg, one of the largest and busiest ports in the United States. She also patrols Florida's inland water ways and coastal fisheries. She is the first Sentinel-class cutter to be stationed at St. Petersburg and is the 13th vessel of the class to be stationed in Florida.
