= USCGC Joseph Doyle =

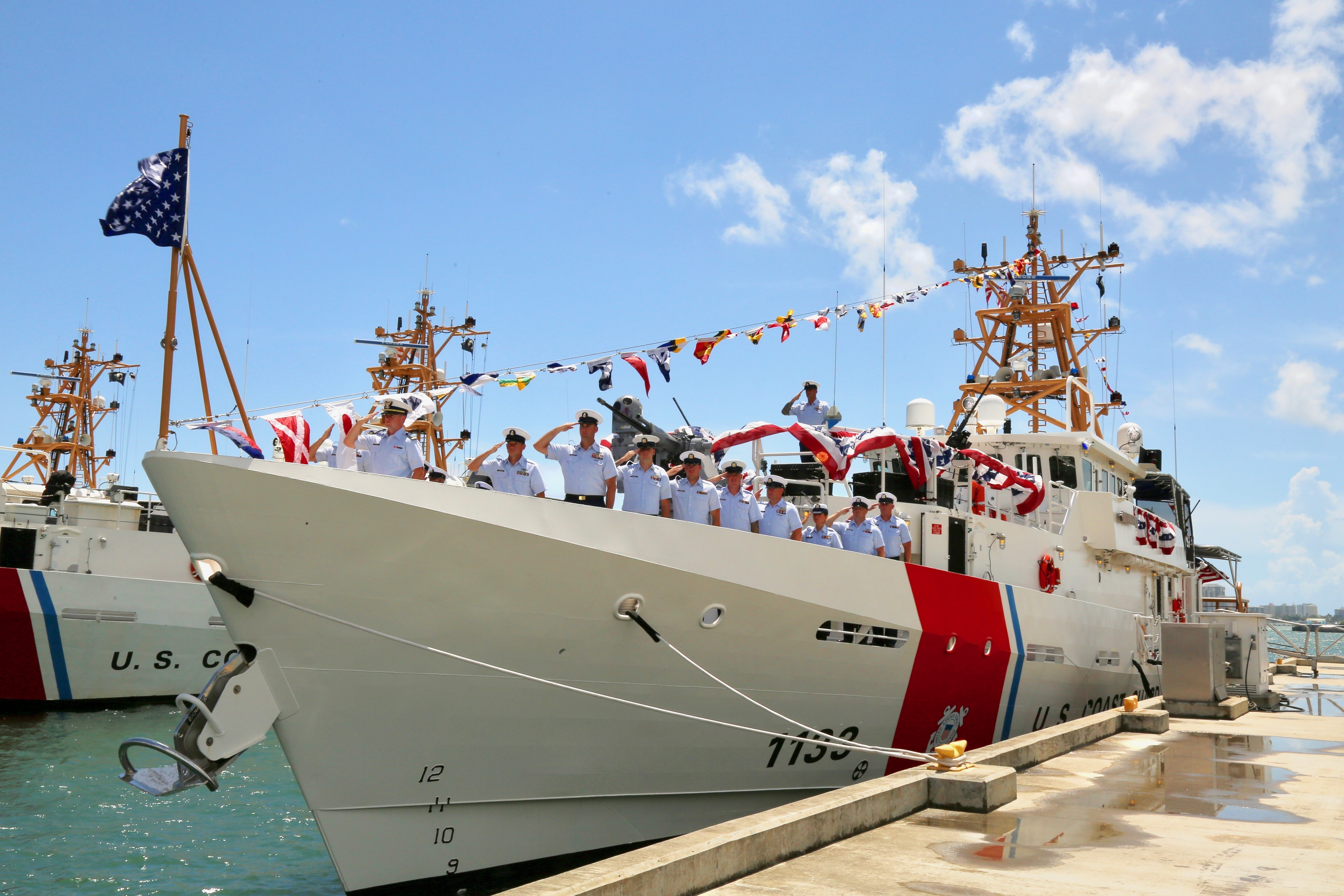
- USCGC Joseph Doyle at commissioning

History

United States
- Name: Joseph Doyle
- Namesake: Joseph Doyle
- Operator: United States Coast Guard
- Builder: Bollinger Shipyards, Lockport, Louisiana
- Launched: March 21, 2019
- Acquired: March 21, 2019
- Commissioned: June 8, 2019
- Home port: San Juan, Puerto Rico
- Identification: Hull number: WPC-1133
- Motto: Courage dans la tempete, "Courage in the Storm"
- Status: in active service
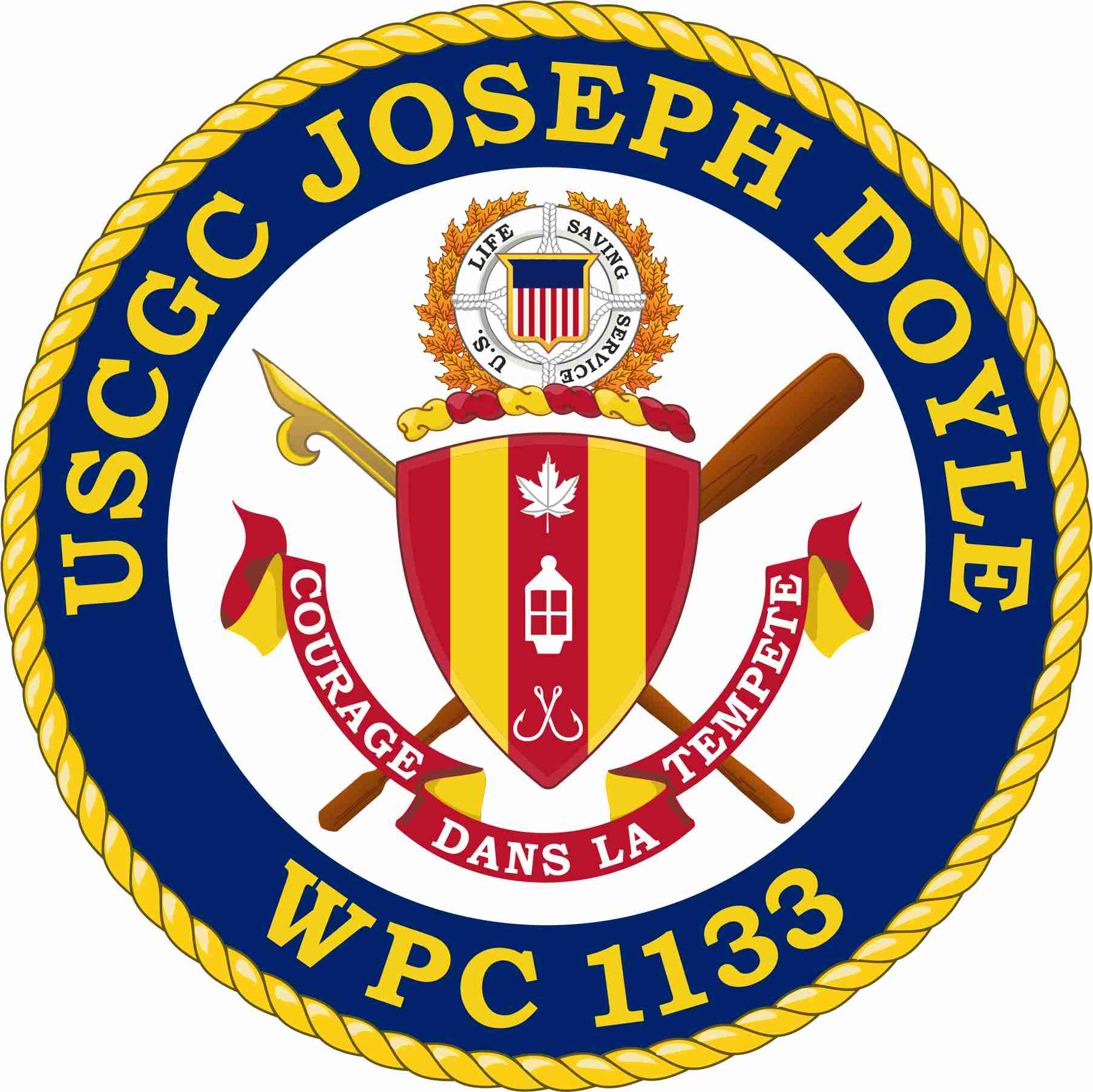
- Badge

General characteristics
- Class & type: Sentinel-class cutter
- Displacement: 353 long tons (359 t)
- Length: 46.8 m (154 ft)
- Beam: 8.11 m (26.6 ft)
- Depth: 2.9 m (9.5 ft)
- Propulsion: 2 × 4,300 kW (5,800 shp); 1 × 75 kW (101 shp) bow thruster
- Speed: 28 knots (52 km/h; 32 mph)
- Range: 2,500 nautical miles (4,600 km; 2,900 mi)
- Endurance: 5 days
- Boats & landing craft carried: 1 × Cutter Boat - Over the Horizon Interceptor
- Complement: 4 officers, 20 crew
- Sensors & processing systems: L-3 C4ISR suite
- Armament: 1 × Mk 38 Mod 2 25 mm automatic gun; 4 × crew-served Browning M2 machine guns
- Notes: First Commanding Officer LT Catherine Gillen

USCGC Joseph Doyle (WPC-1133) is the United States Coast Guard's 33rd Sentinel-class cutter. Upon completion, she was transferred to the Coast Guard in Key West for her acceptance trials on March 21, 2019. She was commissioned on June 8, 2019, and is the first of a second cohort of cutters commissioned in San Juan, Puerto Rico. The first batch of six cutters were commissioned there in 2015 and 2016.

== Design ==
Like her sister ships, Joseph Doyle is designed to perform search and rescue missions, port security, and the interception of smugglers. She is armed with a remotely-controlled, gyro-stabilized 25 mm autocannon, four crew served M2 Browning machine guns, and light arms. She is equipped with a stern launching ramp, that allows her to launch or retrieve a water-jet propelled high-speed auxiliary boat, without first coming to a stop. Her high-speed boat has over-the-horizon capability, and is useful for inspecting other vessels, and deploying boarding parties.

The crew's drinking water needs are met through a desalination unit. The crew mess is equipped with a television with satellite reception.

== Namesake ==
In 2010, Charles "Skip" W. Bowen, who was then the United States Coast Guard's most senior non-commissioned officer, proposed that all 58 cutters in the Sentinel class should be named after enlisted sailors in the Coast Guard, or one of its precursor services, who were recognized for their heroism. The Coast Guard chose Joseph Doyle would be the namesake of the 33rd cutter. Doyle started serving as the keeper of the Charlotte, New York Life Saving Station, in 1878, where he became one of the most admired keepers of the United States Lifesaving Service.
