= USCGC Robert Goldman =

US Coast Guard Sentinel-class cutter

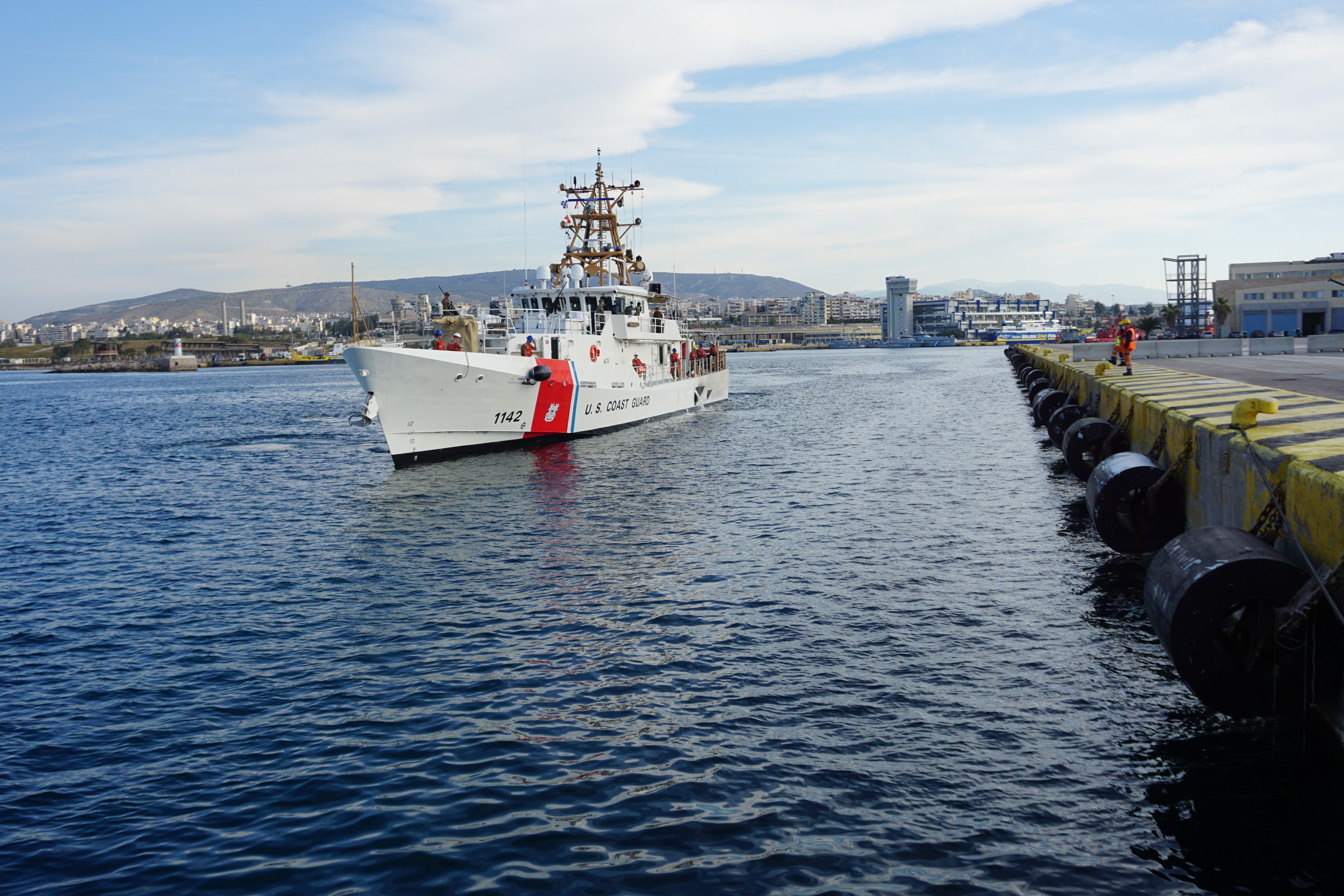
- Robert Goldman shortly after arriving in Cairns, Australia

History

United States
- Name: USCGC Robert Goldman
- Namesake: Robert Goldman
- Operator: United States Coast Guard
- Builder: Bollinger Shipyards, Lockport, Louisiana
- Acquired: December 21, 2020
- Commissioned: March 12, 2021
- Home port: Manama, Bahrain
- Identification: MMSI number: 338926442; Callsign: NRTG; Hull number: WPC-1142
- Status: in active service
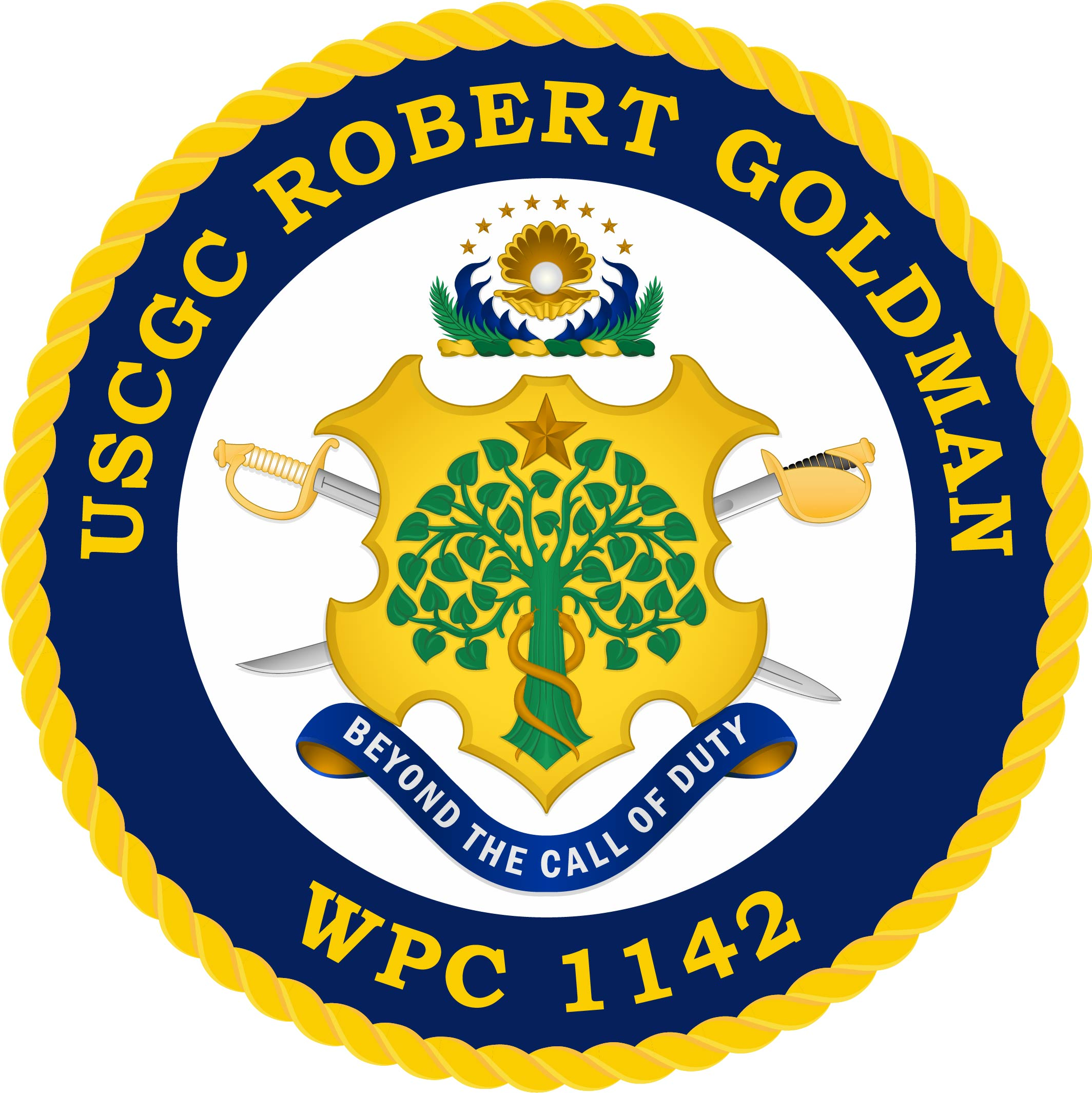
- Badge

General characteristics
- Class & type: Sentinel-class cutter
- Displacement: 353 long tons (359 t)
- Length: 46.8 m (153 ft 7 in)
- Beam: 7.6 m (24 ft 11 in)
- Depth: 2.9 m (9 ft 6 in)
- Propulsion: 2 × 4,300 kW (5,800 shp); 1 × 75 kW (101 shp) bow thruster
- Speed: 28 knots (52 km/h; 32 mph)
- Range: 2,500 nmi (4,600 km; 2,900 mi)
- Endurance: 5 days
- Boats & landing craft carried: 1 × Over the Horizon interceptor
- Complement: 4 officers, 20 crew
- Sensors & processing systems: L-3 C4ISR suite
- Armament: 1 × Mk 38 Mod 2 25 mm automatic gun; 4 × crew-served Browning M2 machine guns

USCGC Robert Goldman (WPC-1142) is the 42nd Sentinel-class cutter built for the United States Coast Guard. She is homeported in Manama, Bahrain.

== Operational history ==
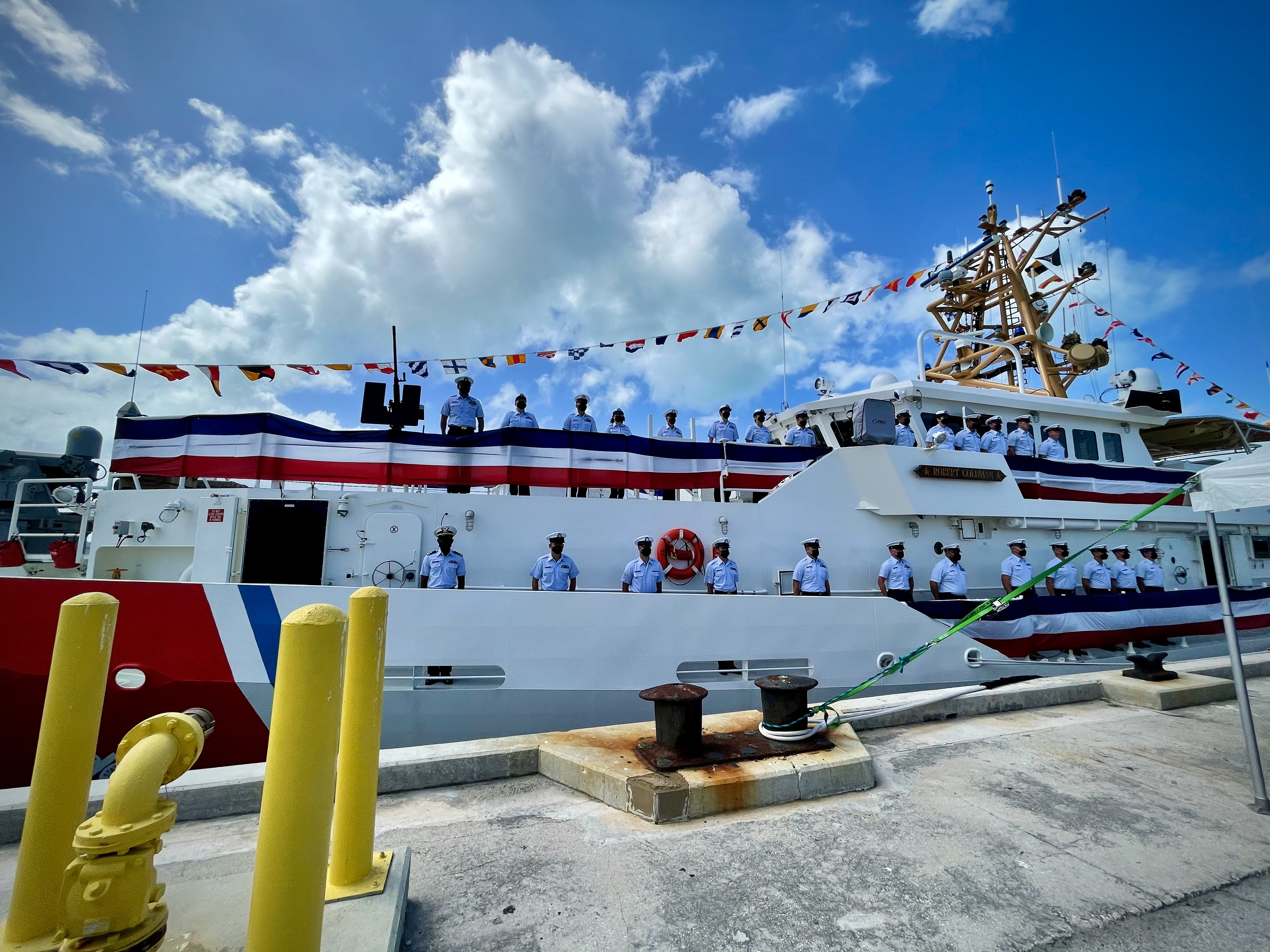
USCGC Robert Goldman during her commissioning ceremony

Robert Goldman was commissioned by Vice Admiral Scott Buschman on March 12, 2021. She is part of Coast Guard's Patrol Forces Southwest Asia (PATFORSWA) in Bahrain.

During April 2021, she took part in drills alongside USCGC Charles Moulthrope with Tunisian forces.

On May 7, 2021, she and USCGC Charles Moulthrope transited through the Suez Canal to be the first two Sentinel-class cutters to join PATFORSWA, part of Commander Task Force 55.

== Namesake ==
She is named for Robert Goldman, who during service on the landing ship Tank-66 on November 12, 1944, a Japanese kamikaze flew into the starboard side of the ship. Goldman was injured from shrapnel from the plane, but nonetheless assisted other wounded and dying sailors. For his actions, he was given the Purple Heart and Bronze Star medals.
