= USCGC Daniel Tarr =

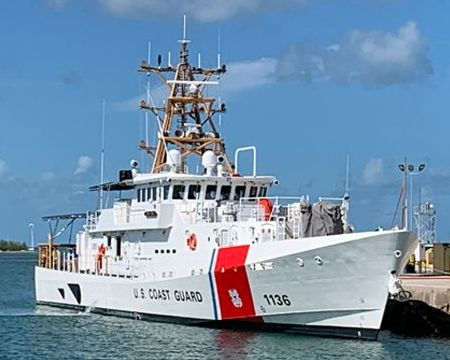
- USCGC Daniel Tarr after arrival in Key West, for her acceptance trials, on November 7, 2019

History

United States
- Name: Daniel Tarr
- Namesake: Daniel Tarr
- Operator: United States Coast Guard
- Builder: Bollinger Shipyards, Lockport, Louisiana
- Acquired: November 7, 2019
- Commissioned: January 10, 2020
- Home port: Galveston
- Identification: Hull number: WPC-1136; MMSI number: 338926436; Callsign: NDTR
- Motto: Optima prima, "Best First"
- Status: in active service
- Notes: “ROLL TARR”
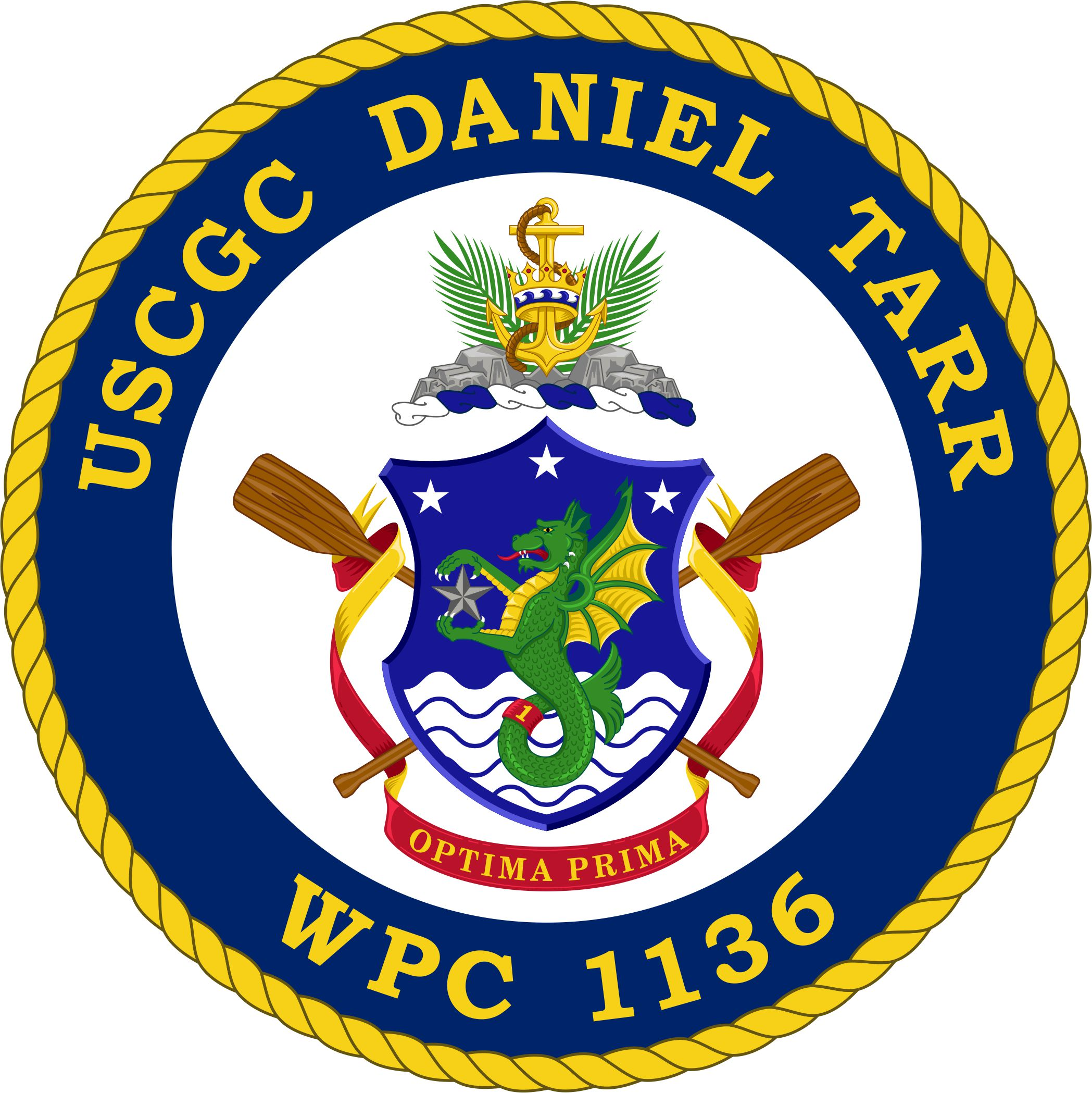
- Badge

General characteristics
- Class & type: Sentinel-class cutter
- Displacement: 353 long tons (359 t)
- Length: 46.8 m (153 ft 7 in)
- Beam: 8.11 m (26 ft 7 in)
- Depth: 2.9 m (9 ft 6 in)
- Propulsion: 2 × 4,300 kW (5,800 shp); 1 × 75 kW (101 shp) bow thruster
- Speed: 28 knots (52 km/h; 32 mph)
- Range: 2,500 nautical miles (4,600 km; 2,900 mi)
- Endurance: 5 days
- Boats & landing craft carried: 1 × Cutter Boat - Over the Horizon Interceptor
- Complement: 4 officers, 20 crew
- Sensors & processing systems: L-3 C4ISR suite
- Armament: 1 × Mk 38 Mod 2 25 mm automatic gun; 4 × crew-served Browning M2 machine guns
- Notes: First Commanding Officer LT Nicholas Martin

USCGC Daniel Tarr (WPC-1136) is the United States Coast Guard's 36th Sentinel-class cutter, and the first of three to be homeported in Galveston, Texas.

== Design ==
Like her sister ships, Daniel Tarr is designed to perform search and rescue missions, port security, and the interception of smugglers. She is armed with a remotely-controlled, gyro-stabilized 25 mm autocannon, four crew served M2 Browning machine guns, and light arms. She is equipped with a stern launching ramp, that allows her to launch or retrieve a water-jet propelled high-speed auxiliary boat, without first coming to a stop. Her high-speed boat has over-the-horizon capability, and is useful for inspecting other vessels, and deploying boarding parties.

The crew's drinking water needs are met through a desalination unit. The crew mess is equipped with a television with satellite reception.

== Operational career ==
Daniel Tarr was delivered to the Coast Guard, in Key West, on November 7, 2019, and she was commissioned on January 10, 2020. On her first patrol she successfully interdicted five illegal Mexican lancha fishing vessels along with hundreds of feet of fishing line. A lancha is a fishing boat used by Mexican fishermen that is approximately 20-30 feet long with a slender profile, having one outboard motor, and is capable of traveling at speeds exceeding 30 mph. Lanchas are frequently used to transport illegal narcotics to the U.S. and illegally fish in the United States’ Exclusive Economic Zone near the U.S./Mexico border in the Gulf of Mexico.

On 2 and 3 April 2023, Daniel Tarr successfully interdicted four lanchas along with their crews and 320 pounds of illegally caught fish. The seventeen crewmembers were turned over to U.S. border enforcement agents.

== Namesake ==
In 2010, Master Chief Petty Officer of the Coast Guard Charles "Skip" W. Bowen, who was then the United States Coast Guard's most senior non-commissioned officer, proposed that all 58 cutters in the Sentinel class should be named after enlisted sailors in the Coast Guard, or one of its precursor services, who were recognized for their heroism. The Coast Guard chose Daniel Tarr as the namesake of the 36th cutter. Tarr, and three other Coast Guard sailors, piloted the first landing craft during the United States first amphibious landing, in the Pacific Theater, during World War II. Tarr, and his three colleagues were each awarded a Silver Star medal for this task. His colleagues Harold Miller and Glen Harris have Sentinel-class cutters named after them, as will his other colleague William Sparling.
