= USCGC Charles Moulthrope =

American Coast Guard fast response cutter

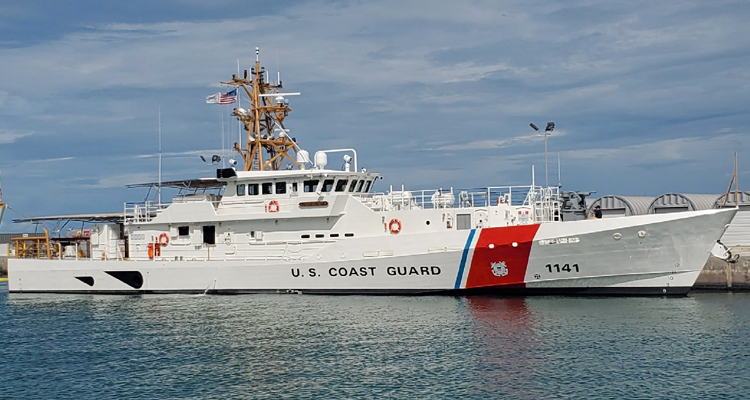

History

United States
- Name: Charles Moulthrope
- Namesake: Charles Moulthrope
- Operator: United States Coast Guard
- Builder: Bollinger Shipyards, Lockport, Louisiana
- Launched: October 22, 2020
- Acquired: October 22, 2020
- Commissioned: January 21, 2021
- Home port: Manama, Bahrain
- Identification: Hull number: WPC-1141
- Motto: Before the Mast
- Status: in active service
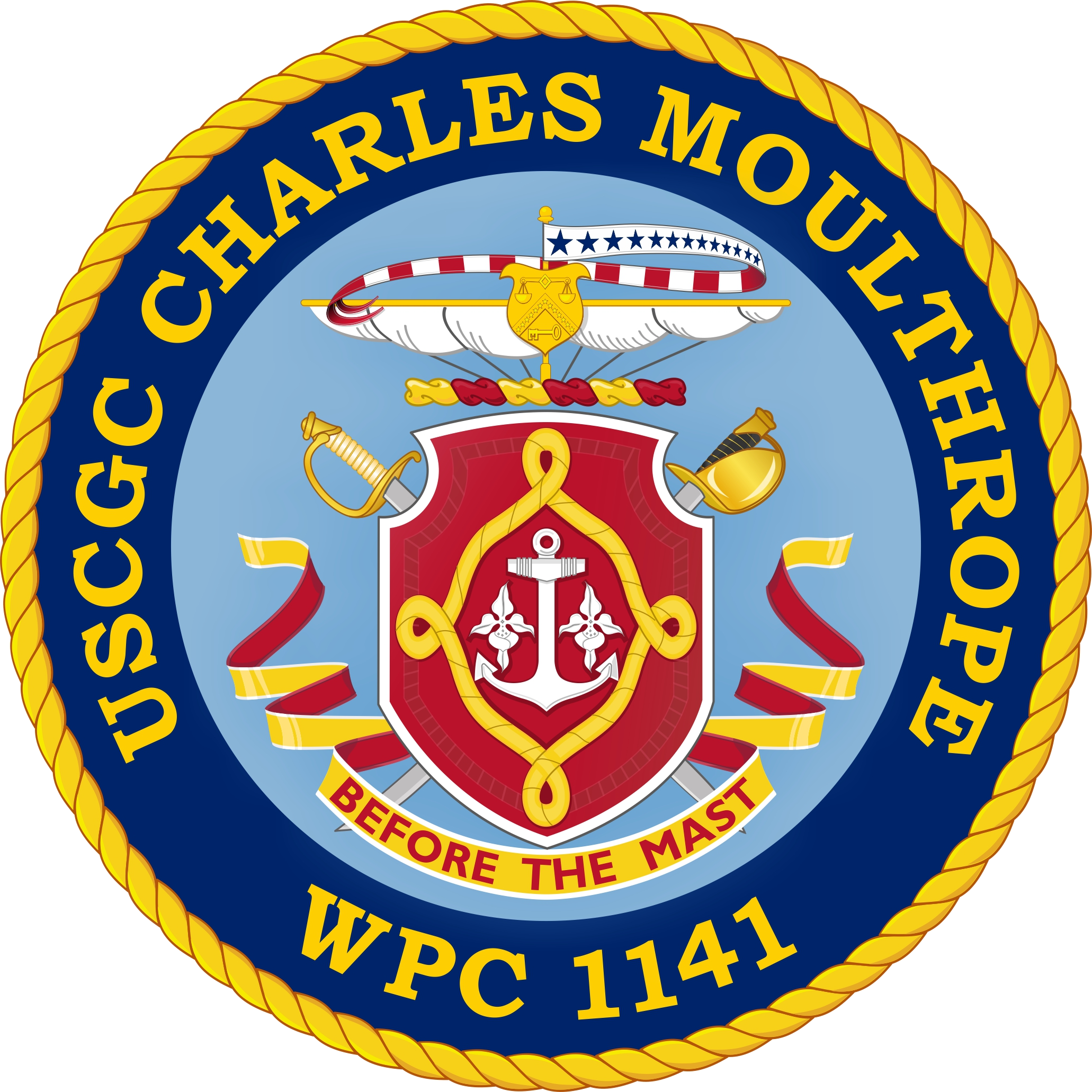
- Badge

General characteristics
- Class & type: Sentinel-class cutter
- Displacement: 353 long tons (359 t)
- Length: 46.8 m (154 ft)
- Beam: 8.11 m (26.6 ft)
- Depth: 2.9 m (9.5 ft)
- Propulsion: 2 × 4,300 kW (5,800 shp); 1 × 75 kW (101 shp) bow thruster
- Speed: 28 knots (52 km/h; 32 mph)
- Range: 2,500 nautical miles (4,600 km; 2,900 mi)
- Endurance: 5 days
- Boats & landing craft carried: 1 × Cutter Boat - Over the Horizon Interceptor
- Complement: 4 officers, 20 crew
- Sensors & processing systems: L-3 C4ISR suite
- Armament: 1 × Mk 38 Mod 2 25 mm automatic gun; 4 × crew-served Browning M2 machine guns
- Notes: First Commanding Officer Lt. Cmdr. Steven Hulse

USCGC Charles Moulthrope (WPC-1141) is the United States Coast Guard's 41st Sentinel-class cutter, and the first of six to be homeported in Manama, Bahrain.

Like her sister ships she was built in the Bollinger Shipyards, in Lockport, Louisiana.

== Design ==
Like her sister ships, Charles Moulthrope is designed to perform search and rescue missions, port security, and the interception of smugglers. She is armed with a remotely-controlled, gyro-stabilized 25 mm autocannon, four crew served M2 Browning machine guns, and light arms. She is equipped with a stern launching ramp, that allows her to launch or retrieve a water-jet propelled high-speed auxiliary boat, without first coming to a stop. Her high-speed boat has over-the-horizon capability, and is useful for inspecting other vessels, and deploying boarding parties.

The crew's drinking water needs are met through a desalination unit. The crew mess is equipped with a television with satellite reception.

== Operational career ==
The vessel was delivered to the Coast Guard base in Key West for her acceptance trials on October 22, 2020. She was commissioned in Portsmouth, Virginia on January 21, 2021.

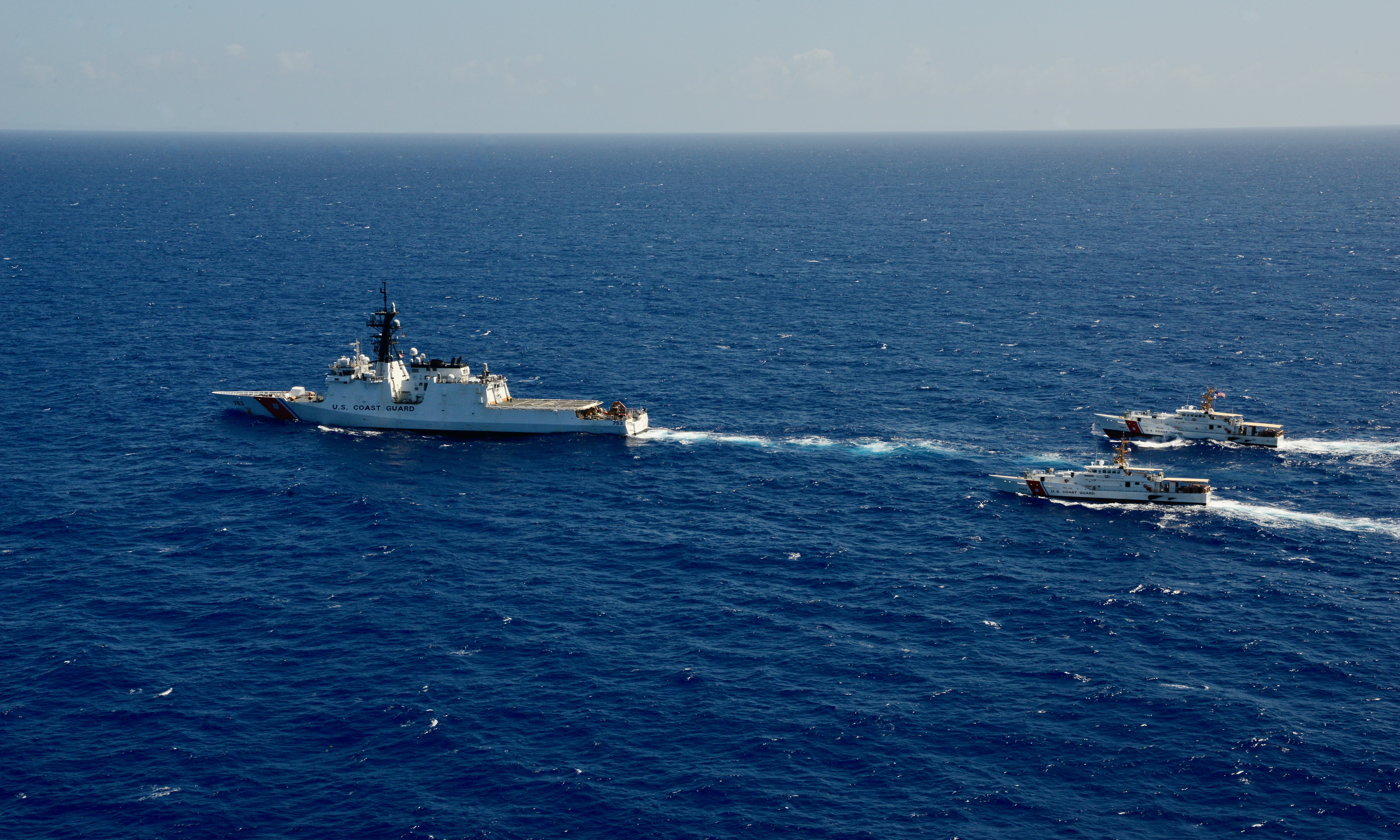
Charles Moulthrope (upper right) crossing the Atlantic Ocean in 2021

Charles Moulthrope began her trip from Puerto Rico to Manama, Bahrain on April 1, 2021 accompanied by the cutters Robert Goldman and Hamilton. The ships arrived at Naval Station Rota in Spain on April 14, 2021 after their Atlantic crossing. Charles Moulthrope and her sister ship Robert Goldman reached their homeport of Manama, Bahrain on May 25, 2021.

== Namesake ==
In 2010, Charles "Skip" W. Bowen, who was then the United States Coast Guard's most senior non-commissioned officer, proposed that all 58 cutters in the Sentinel class should be named after enlisted sailors in the Coast Guard, or one of its precursor services, who were recognized for their heroism. The Coast Guard chose Charles Moulthrope as the namesake of the 41st cutter. Moulthrope was serving on the Revenue Service cutter USRC Commodore Perry, exploring Alaska, in 1896, when he died after a fall to its deck. Not long before, he had saved four of his shipmates after their small boat capsized while unsuccessfully trying to rescue a fifth shipmate.
