= USCGC Paul Clark =

American Sentinel-class cutter

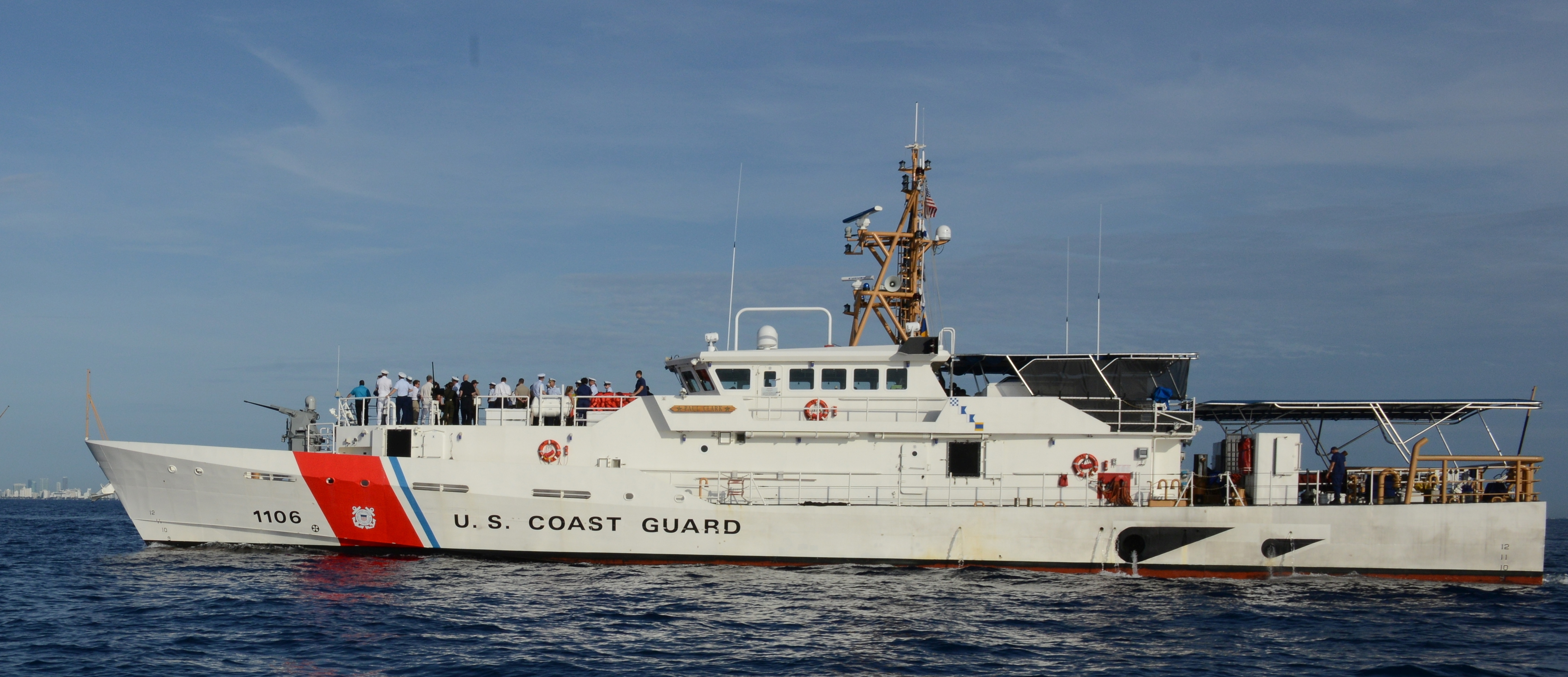
- Paul Clark underway.

History

United States
- Name: USCGC Paul Clark
- Namesake: Paul Clark
- Operator: United States Coast Guard
- Builder: Bollinger Shipyards, Lockport, Louisiana
- Launched: January 13, 2012
- Acquired: May 18, 2013
- Commissioned: August 24, 2013
- Out of service: 2018
- Home port: Miami, Florida
- Identification: MMSI number: 338926406; Callsign: NAAD; Hull number: WPC-1106
- Motto: Courage valor confidence
- Status: in active service
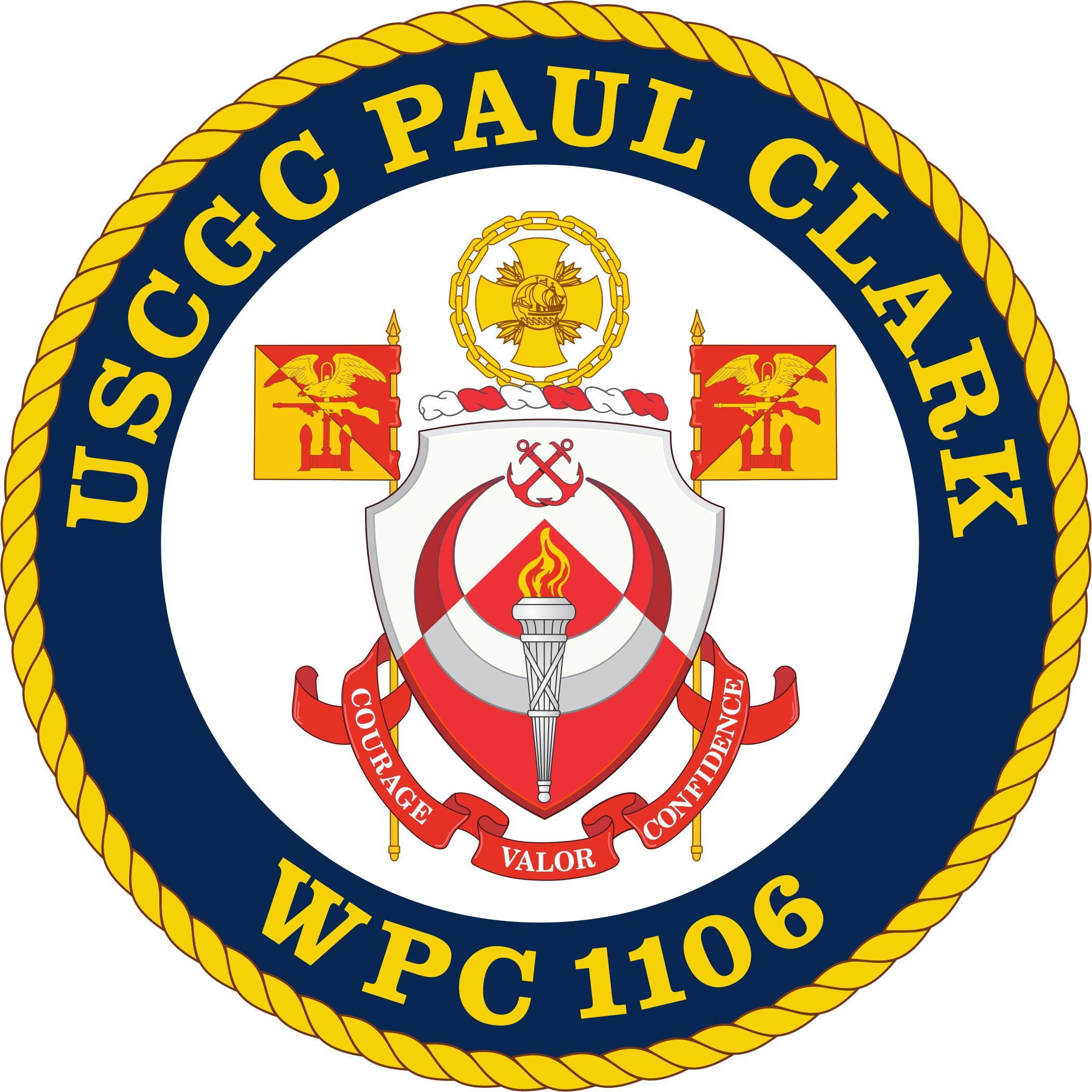
- Badge

General characteristics
- Class & type: Sentinel-class cutter
- Displacement: 353 long tons (359 t)
- Length: 46.8 m (154 ft)
- Beam: 8.11 m (26.6 ft)
- Depth: 2.9 m (9.5 ft)
- Propulsion: 2 × 4,300 kW (5,800 shp); 1 × 75 kW (101 shp) bow thruster
- Speed: 28 knots (52 km/h; 32 mph)
- Endurance: 5 days, 2,500 nautical miles (4,600 km; 2,900 mi); Designed to be on patrol 2,500 hours per year
- Boats & landing craft carried: 1 × Short Range Prosecutor RHIB
- Complement: 2 officers, 20 crew
- Sensors & processing systems: L-3 C4ISR suite
- Armament: 1 × Mk 38 Mod 2 25 mm automatic gun; 4 × crew-served Browning M2 machine guns

USCGC Paul Clark (WPC-1106) is the sixth Sentinel-class cutter. Like the previous five vessels of her class she is homeported in Miami, Florida. She was delivered to the Coast Guard, for testing, on May 18, 2013.

== Operational history ==
On September 13, 2013 the vessel repatriated 66 Cuban migrants to Bahia de Cabañas. Four migrant boats had been intercepted by small Coast Guard vessels in four separate operations over the preceding days. Their passengers and crew were transferred to the larger Paul Clark for repatriation to Cuba.

"Our main concern is the safety of life at sea...Attempting to cross the Florida Straits in a homemade raft or vessel is inherently dangerous", explained Coast Guard Captain Mark Fedor.

== Namesake ==
The vessel is named after Paul Leaman Clark, who served as a fireman in the United States Coast Guard during World War II. Clark was a landing boat engineer attached to USS Joseph T. Dickman during the allied assault on a beach in French Morocco when the craft's two other crew members were wounded by a Luftwaffe fighter. Clark took command of the craft, took the wounded crew members to USS Palmer for medical care and then returned to his duties as a beachmaster, directing disembarkation activity. For his courage he was awarded the Navy Cross.
