= USCGC Donald Horsley =

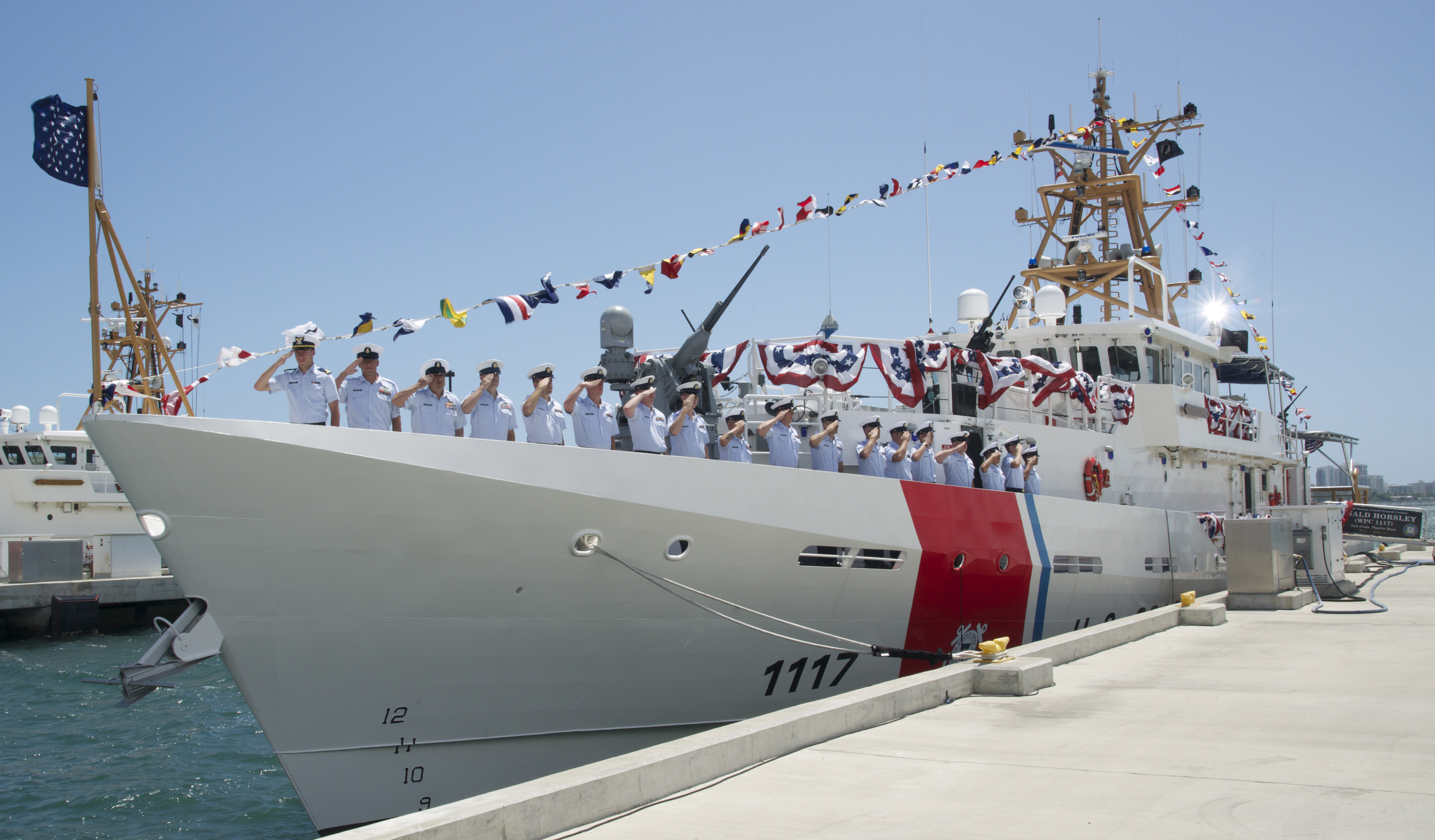
- Commissioning USCGC Donald Horsley.

History

United States
- Name: Donald Horsley
- Namesake: Donald Horsley
- Operator: United States Coast Guard
- Builder: Bollinger Shipyards, Lockport, Louisiana
- Launched: March 5, 2016
- Acquired: March 5, 2016
- Commissioned: May 20, 2016
- Home port: Galveston, Texas
- Identification: MMSI number: 338926417; Callsign: NDOE; Hull number: WPC-1117
- Motto: Facere inferna (Raise hell)
- Status: in active service
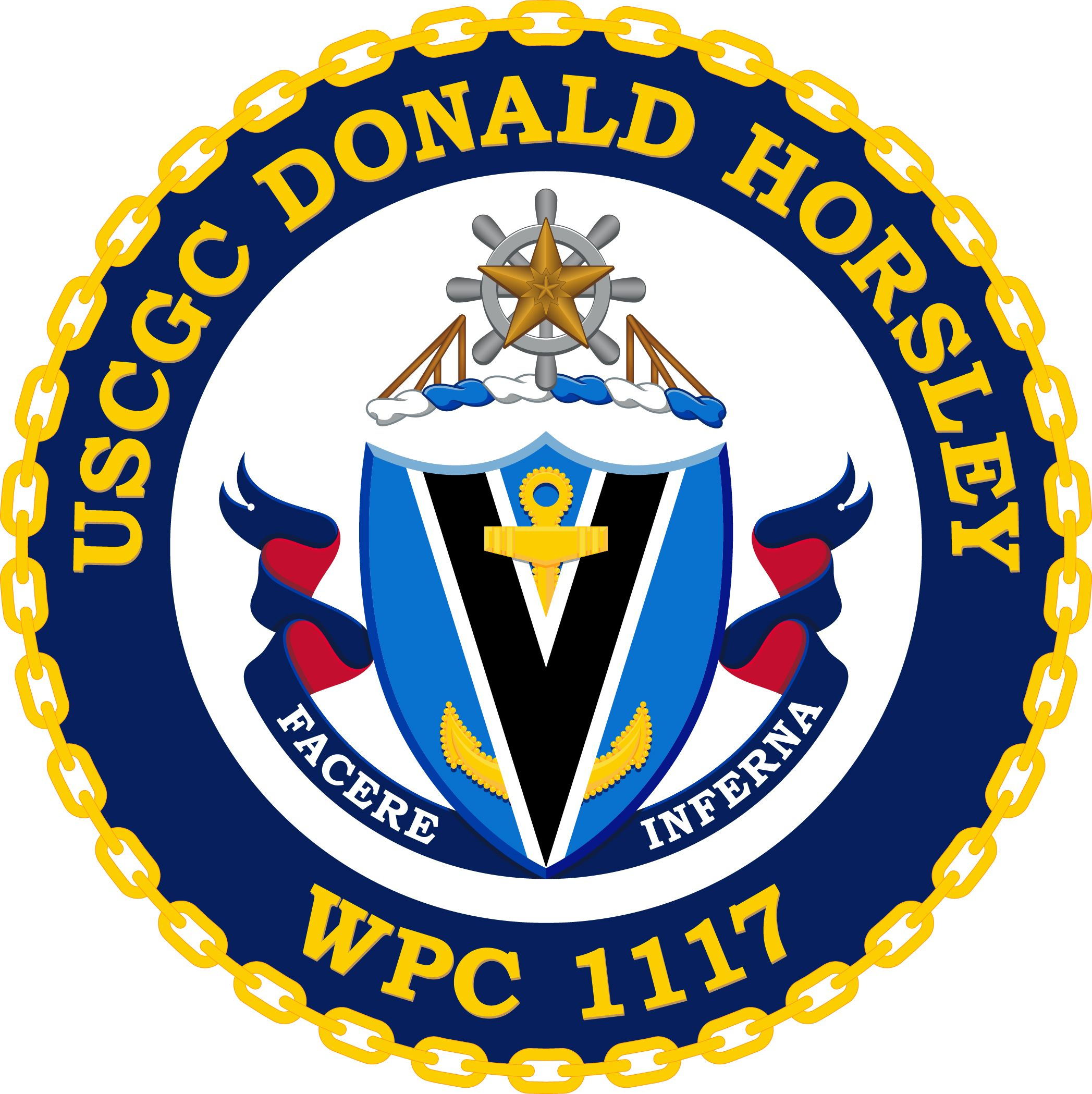
- Badge

General characteristics
- Class & type: Sentinel-class cutter
- Displacement: 353 long tons (359 t)
- Length: 46.8 m (154 ft)
- Beam: 8.11 m (26.6 ft)
- Depth: 2.9 m (9.5 ft)
- Propulsion: 2 × 4,300 kW (5,800 shp); 1 × 75 kW (101 shp) bow thruster
- Speed: 28 knots (52 km/h; 32 mph)
- Endurance: 5 days, 2,500 nmi (4,600 km; 2,900 mi); Designed to be on patrol 2,500 hours per year
- Boats & landing craft carried: 1 × Cutter Boat - Over the Horizon OTH-IV
- Complement: 4 officers, 20 crew
- Sensors & processing systems: L-3 C4ISR suite
- Armament: 1 × Mk 38 Mod 2 25 mm automatic gun; 4 × crew-served Browning M2 machine guns

USCGC Donald Horsley (WPC-1117) is the United States Coast Guard's 17th Sentinel-class cutter. She was commissioned on May 20, 2016, and was the fifth of a cohort of six FRCs home-ported in San Juan, Puerto Rico. She is currently home-ported in Galveston, Texas.

== Namesake ==
Donald R. Horsley rose to the rank of Master Chief, retiring with eleven service stripes, indicating 44 years of service. He served in three wars, and received multiple awards for valor.

In 2010, Master Chief Petty Officer of the Coast Guard Charles "Skip" W. Bowen, the U.S. Coast Guard's senior enlisted person at the time, lobbied for the new Sentinel-class cutters to be named after enlisted Coast Guardsmen, or personnel from its precursor services, who had distinguished themselves by their heroism.
