= Margaret Norvell =

- Born: Margaret Celeste Dimitry Ruth; February 11, 1860; Washington, DC
- Died: July 17, 1934 (aged 74)
- Burial place: Metairie Cemetery
- Military career
- Allegiance: United States
- Branch: United States Lighthouse Service
- Nickname: Madge

Margaret Norvell (February 11, 1860 – July 17, 1934) was a lighthouse keeper, employed by the United States Lighthouse Service, a precursor agency to the United States Coast Guard. Norvell became a lighthouse keeper in 1891, and remained in that service for 41 years. Widows whose husbands were lighthouse keepers, who died in office, were allowed to hold positions as lighthouse keepers themselves. Norvell's husband drowned in the course of his duties. Norvell was credited with saving many lives, including by venturing out into storms in a rowboat to rescue stranded mariners.

== Early life ==
Born Margaret Celeste Dimitry Ruth on February 11, 1860, in Washington D.C. and married Louis Gray Norvell in 1883. Louis Gray Norvell was from St. Louis and became a lighthouse keeper on Deer Island at the Head of Passes on the Mississippi River.

== USCGC Margaret Norvell ==
In 2010 when the Coast Guard decided that all the new Sentinel class cutters would be named after Coast Guard personnel who had been recognized for their heroism Norvell was one of those to be honored. The fifth cutter in the class will be named the USCGC Margaret Norvell (WPC-1105). She will be homeported in Miami, Florida, with the other first five cutters to be delivered. Although she is homeported in Miami, the Coast Guard brought her to New Orleans, whose sea traffic was protected by the lighthouses she served in, for her official commissioning. 55 of Norvell's descendants attended her commissioning in June, 2013.
