= Marvin Perrett =

U.S. Coast Guard sailor

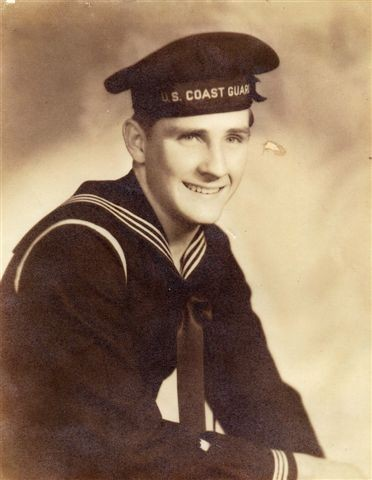
- Born: 1925-09-17; New Orleans
- Died: May 7, 2007 (aged 81); Metairie, Louisiana
- Other name: Marvin J. Perrett
- Occupation: sailor
- Known for: served heroically, commanding landing craft, during ww2

Marvin Perrett was a high-recognized sailor of the United States Coast Guard.

Perrett served aboard the troop transport USS Bayfield, commanding one of her landing craft, during the invasion of Normandy, and invasions in the Pacific Ocean, including the Invasion of Iwo Jima and the Invasion of Okinawa.

Perrett was able to complete the landing of two sets of troops on Utah Beach, at Normandy. After landing his troops at Iwo Jima his landing craft shipped water, and was swamped, and was abandoned. He and his small crew spent the rest of their day on the beach, finally getting a return to his ship around midnight. At Okinawa his landing craft was involved in a series of feints, proceeding close to several beaches, but then withdrawing, without landing.

Following the war Perrett's oral history of his wartime experience was widely distributed, and he was a frequent speaker.

== Legacy ==
Interviews with Perrett appeared in multiple documentary films. The Imperial War Museum, in London, had an exhibit focussed around Perrett, his landing craft, PA 33-21, based on his oral history. Perrett gave a demonstration of piloting a recreation of his landing craft, on Lake Pontchartrain, a week prior to his death in 2007.

Higgins boats, the manufacturer of Perrett's original landing craft, built a reproduction, in 2009, that it named the Marvin Perrett.

In 2010, Charles "Skip" W. Bowen, who was then the Coast Guard's most senior non-commissioned officer, proposed that all the cutters in the Sentinel class should be named after enlisted sailors in the Coast Guard, or one of its precursor services, who were recognized for their heroism. In 2019 the Coast Guard announced that Marvin Perrett would be the namesake of the 64th cutter, USCGC Marvin Perrett.
