= Long Range Interceptor =

2013 class of American interceptor craft

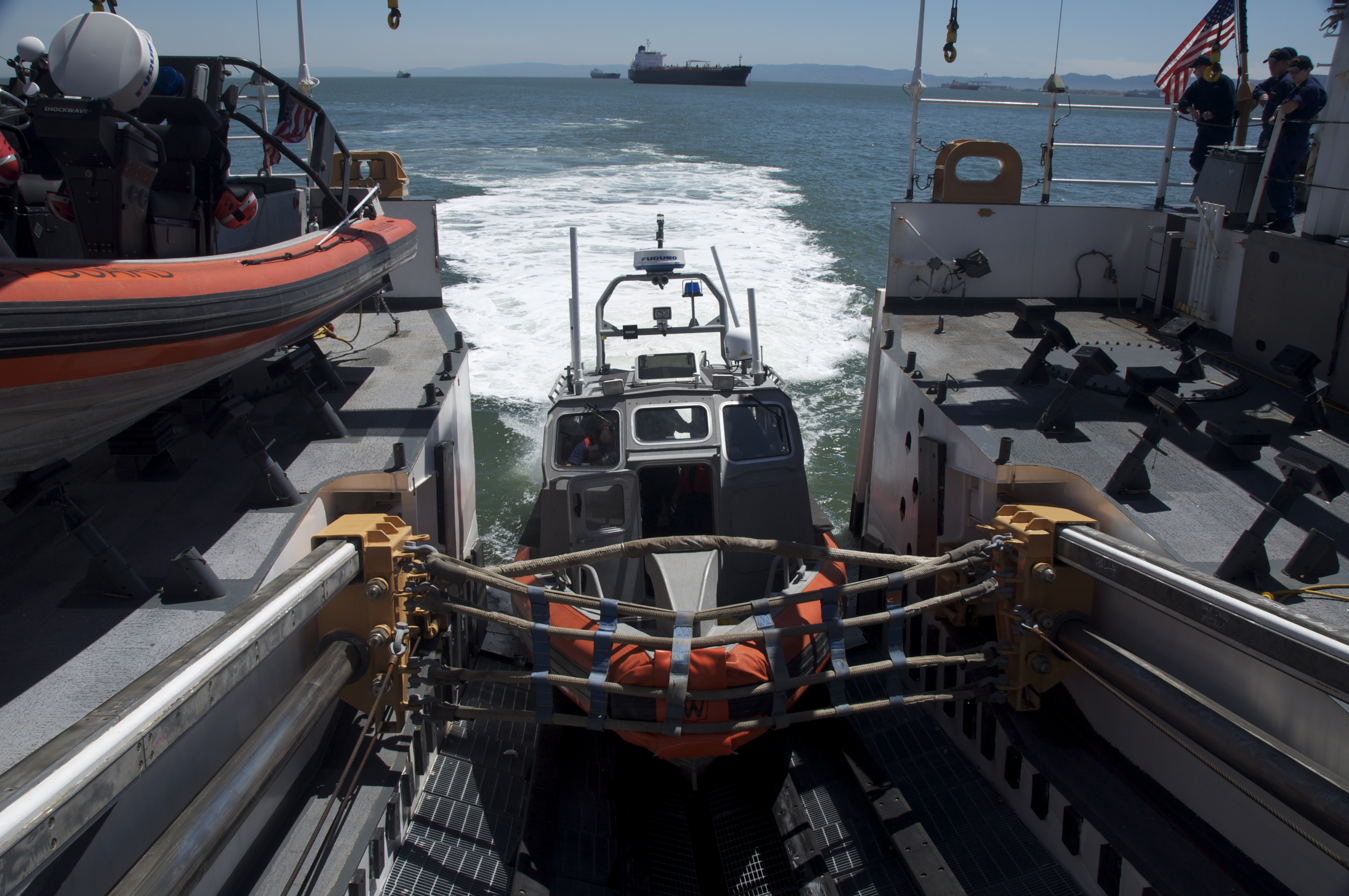
Long Range Interceptor (LRI-II) coming aboard USCGC Bertholf

The Long Range Interceptor (LRI) is an 11-meter (35 feet) high speed launch vessel designed to be deployed from United States Coast Guard cutters via a rear launching ramp. The Long Range Interceptor is an aluminum boat, powered by Ultrajet brand water-jets, for intercepting and boarding suspect vessels. It mounts a radar, special shock-proof seats, and can travel at 35 knots (65 km/h). They can be armed with machine guns or grenade launchers, and can be equipped with ballistic panels for crew protection when required.

The National Security Cutters (NSC) have a rear launching/retrieval ramp, and carry two launches, either two of the smaller 7-meter USCG Short Range Prosecutors, or two USCG Long Range Interceptors, or one of each.

Under the Integrated Deepwater System Program, the US Coast Guard's outside private contracting company, Integrated Coast Guard Systems (ICGS), signed a $2.9 million contract for the construction of one Long Range Interceptor in February 2006 with Willard Marine. However, because the LRI's design did not meet Coast Guard's requirements, the Coast Guard planned to hold a full and open competition for additional LRIs that would comply with future NSCs requirements.

In June 2012, the United States Coast Guard selected MetalCraft Marine U.S. in Cape Vincent, New York, and awarded a five-year production contract with a potential total value of up to $10.2 million with the option to build up to ten of the latest version of the Long Range Interceptor (LRI-II). On December 12, 2013, the Coast Guard placed a delivery order valued at $3.973 million for the first four LRI-II cutter boats. The first LRI-II was delivered on February 20, 2013, and commenced testing aboard the Coast Guard's first National Security Cutter, the USCGC Bertholf (WMSL-750). The LRI-II project was approved for full-rate production on June 27, 2013, after successful operational and interface testing activities with the Bertholf. The third LRI-II was delivered in November 2014 to the USCGC Waesche (WMSL-751), and the fourth LRI-II was delivered in February 2015 to the fourth NSC, the USCGC Hamilton (WMSL-753). By that time, the Coast Guard had ordered six LRI-IIs from MetalCraft.

== Specification ==
- Length: 36 ft (11 m)
- Displacement: 24,000 lb (10.89 t)
- Capacity: maximum of 14 passengers
- Speed: 45 kn (83 km/h)
- Range: 400 nmi (740 km)
- Endurance: 10 hr
- Armament: 2 x M240 machine guns, Small Arms
- Propulsion: 2 diesel engines drive 2 water jet engines

== See also ==
- Equipment of the United States Coast Guard
