= Pablo Valent =

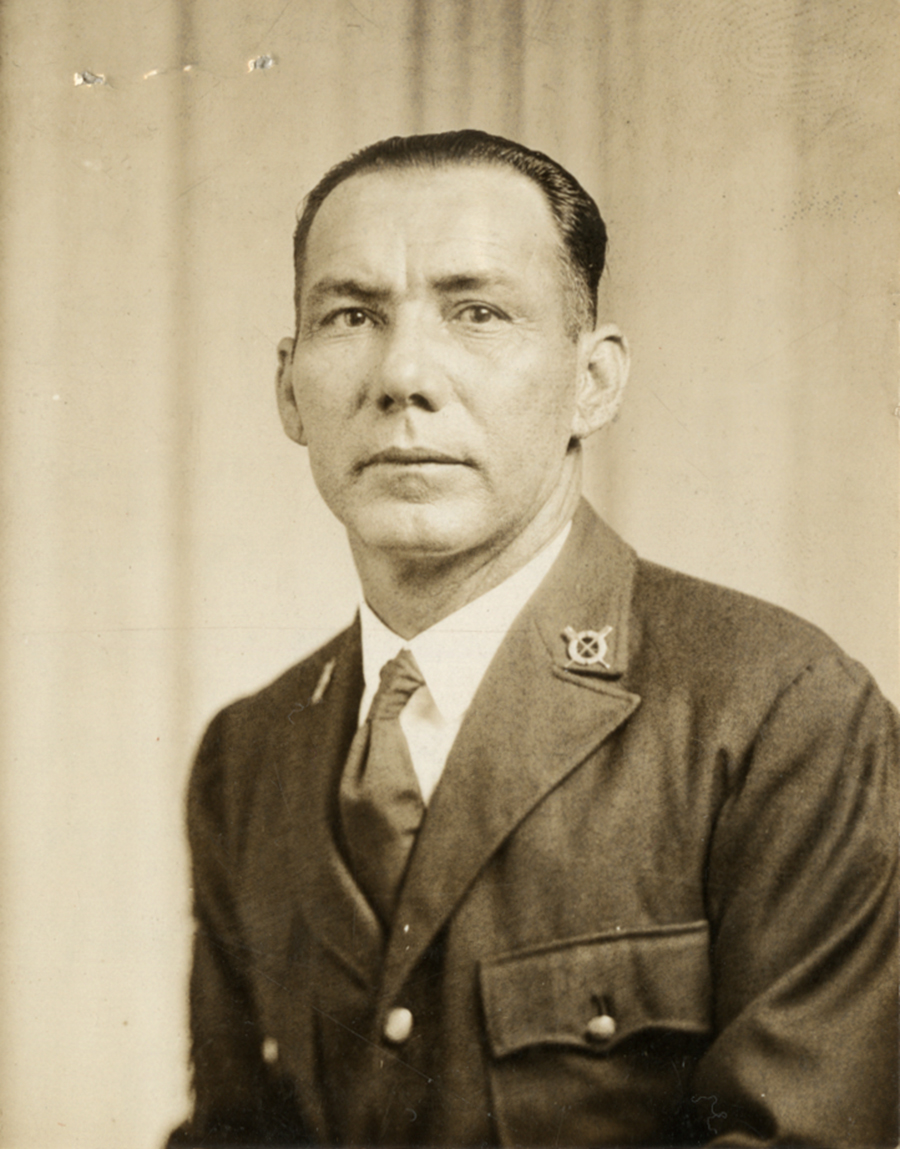
- Born: January 15, 1892; Corpus Christi, Texas
- Died: September 5, 1969 (aged 77)
- Military career
- Allegiance: United States of America
- Branch: United States Coast Guard
- Service years: 1912–1940
- Rank: Chief Boatswain's Mate
- Awards: Lifesaving Medal

Pablo Valent (January 15, 1892 – September 5, 1969) was an American Coast Guardsman best known for his part in the rescue of the crew of the Cape Horn in 1919.

Originally from Corpus Christi, Texas, Valent joined the United States Life-Saving Service in 1912 (Note: The Life-Saving Service was consolidated with the Revenue Cutter Service to become the U.S. Coast Guard in 1915.) and spent the bulk of his service at the Coast Guard station in Brazos, Texas.

During the hurricane which made landfall outside Corpus Christi in September 1919, Valent was part of a Coast Guard crew credited with the rescue of the endangered schooner Cape Horn. According to the official account of events, watchstanders at Coast Guard Station 222 spotted the Cape Horn in distress, whereupon the station's 36-foot Type E oar-powered surfboat was launched – Valent among its crew – into the hurricane force swells. The surfboat reached the vessel two hours later, just as the Cape Horn began to sink, and safely rescued all aboard. For his efforts, Valent was decorated with the Silver Lifesaving Medal and also received the Grand Cross from the American Cross of Honor.

In 1935, Valent took command of the Coast Guard station in Port Isabel, Texas. In 1938 when President Franklin D. Roosevelt made an unannounced stop at Port Isabel aboard his yacht Potomac, Valent and two of his men patrolled the surrounding waters during the night in a 36-foot lifeboat while two U.S. Navy destroyers stood watch further offshore. Valent retired in 1940 and went into business with his brother. In 1944, he was appointed to the Brownsville, Texas housing authority board.

Valent Hall, a facility at Coast Guard Sector Corpus Christi, is named after Valent. USCGC Pablo Valent was also named in his honor.
