= Damen Stan Patrol 4708 =

Dutch patrol vessel class

A United States Coast Guard Sentinel-class cutter based on the Damen Stan 4708 patrol vessel design.

The Damen Group shipbuilders, based in the Netherlands, has managed the manufacture of Damen Stan patrol vessel 4708 for South Africa and the United States. The vessels, like the earlier Damen Stan patrol vessel 4207, are designed for high speed coastal patrols. They can be flexibly configured to serve in a constabulary, environmental protection, or warship role.

According to Sanjay Badri-Maharaj, of the Institute for Defence Studies and Analyses, adding more powerful engines, an autocannon, and military class sensor suite to the United States Coast Guard's Sentinel-class cutters boosted its cost per vessel from $20 million USD to $65 million.
