= Columbia Elizabeth =

Cargo barge

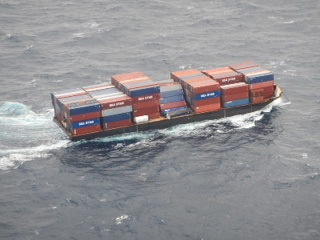
The super-barge Columbia Elizabeth, showing missing containers, 2015-12-06, via USCG.

Columbia Elizabeth is a barge designed to carry shipping containers. She was launched in 1999, for Columbia Coastal Transport. The vessel's IMO number is 8639132. Her capacity is 912 TEU standard containers. When she was built she was one of the largest container barges ever built. Workboat magazine described her deck area as "the size of a football field".

Forty-foot containers are stacked in seven rows, up to six containers high, and eleven containers across.

On December 6, 2015, the Columbia Elizabeth was being towed south, by the Capt. Latham, near Port Canaveral, Florida, when crew members noticed she was missing some shipping containers. She was diverted to the Port of Palm Beach where it was determined 25 shipping containers were missing. The Margaret Norvell, and other elements of the Coast Guard, were assigned to look for the missing containers. One container washed ashore near Port Canaveral. Some of the missing containers contained electric batteries, a cargo that is considered toxic.
