= Short Range Prosecutor =

Class of American rigid inflatable boats

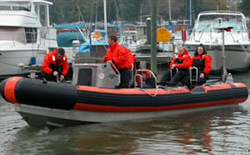
Short Range Prosecutor in use

The United States Coast Guard (USCG) Short Range Prosecutor is a 7-meter, high speed launch designed to be launched from cutters, at speed, from a stern launching ramp. The Short Range Prosecutor is a rigid-hull inflatable, powered by water-jets, for intercepting and boarding suspect vessels. It mounts a radar and special shock-proof seats, and can travel at 30 knots.

The refitted Island class Patrol cutters, part of the Deepwater program, were each to carry one Short Range Prosecutor. The Marine Protector cutters each carry one Short Range Prosecutor. The new Sentinel class cutters will carry one Short Range Prosecutor. The National Security Cutters will have a rear launching ramps, and will carry two launches, either two Short Range Prosecutors, or two of the larger USCG Long Range Interceptors, or one of each.

== Specification ==
- Length: 25 ft (7 m)
- Displacement: 5600 lb (2.54 t)
- Capacity: maximum 10 people
- Speed: 33 kn
- Range: 400 nmi
- Endurance: 10 h
- Armament: M240 machine gun
- Propulsion: 2 diesel engines with water jet engine

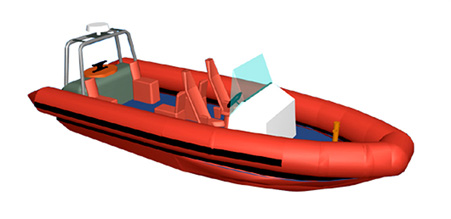
USCG Short Range Prosecutor

== See also ==
Boats of similar role and configuration:

- Pacific 24
