= Stern launching ramp =

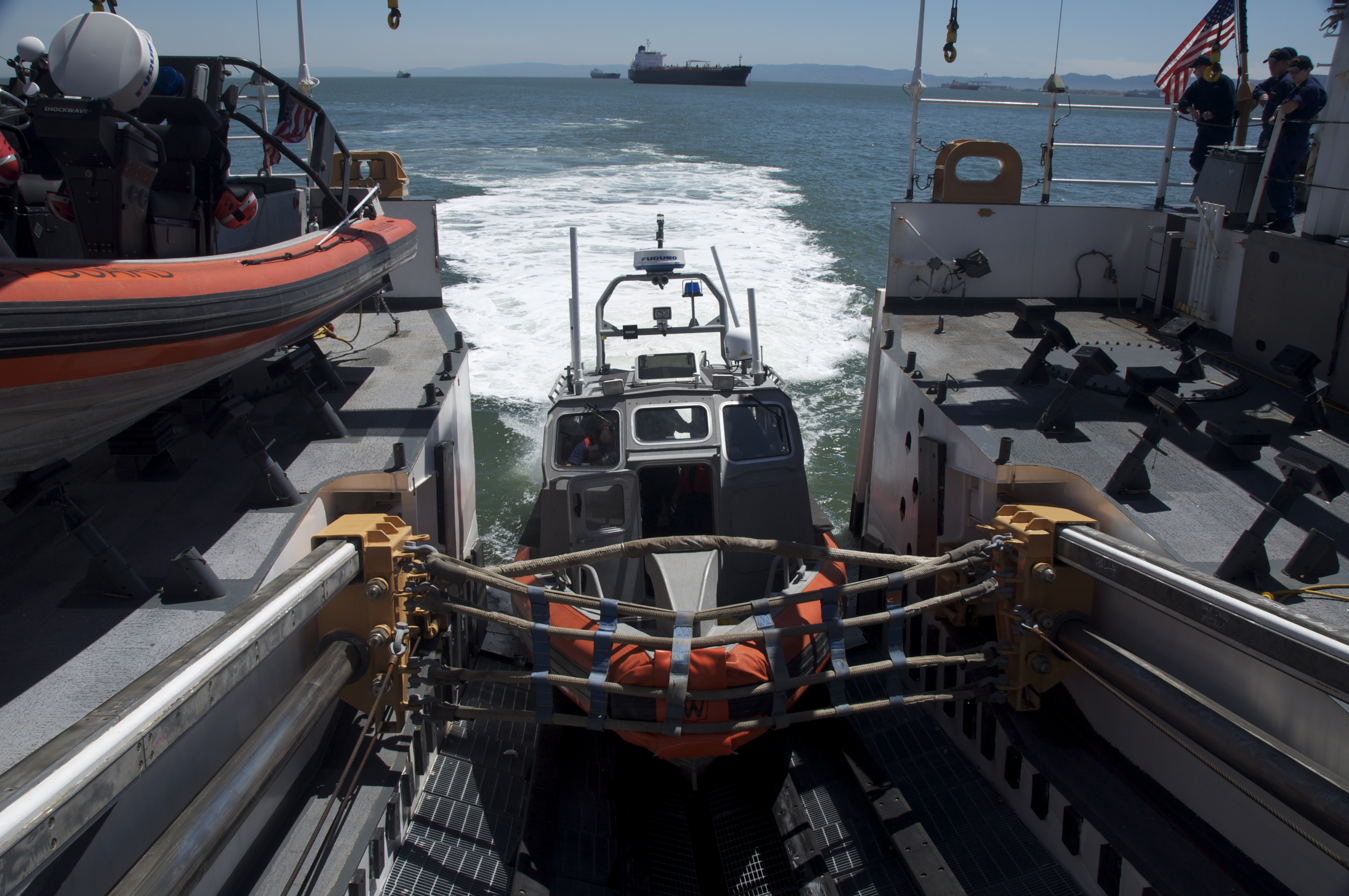
USCG long range interceptor using the stern launching ramp of the USCGC Bertholf -- a frigate sized cutter.

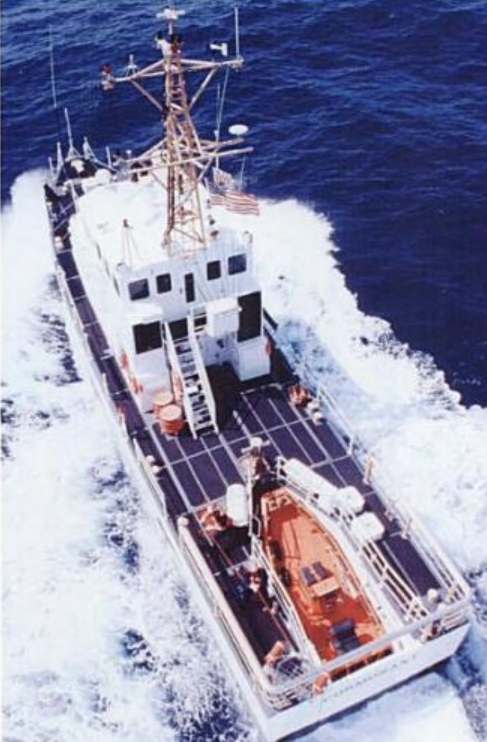
Aerial view of a USCG Marine Protector showing its short range prosecutor nestled in its stern launching ramp.

Some modern patrol vessels are equipped with a stern launching ramp, or simply launching ramp, for deploying smaller rescue or pursuit boats without requiring the parent ship to first come to a halt. Typically the smaller craft are powered by water-jets, and can drive themselves up the ramp by their own power.

The stern launching ramps on the United States Coast Guard's Marine Protector cutters developed by David Cannell naval architects require only a single crewmember to remain on deck when its short range prosecutor boat is deployed or retrieved.

When the brand new USCGC John F. McCormick visited Astoria, Oregon, the station of its namesake John F. McCormick, Jeff Heffernan, of the Daily Astorian described how a stern launching ramp allowed a parent vessel to launch her boat in larger swells.
