= HMPNGS Seeadler =

Papua New Guinea Defence Force vessel

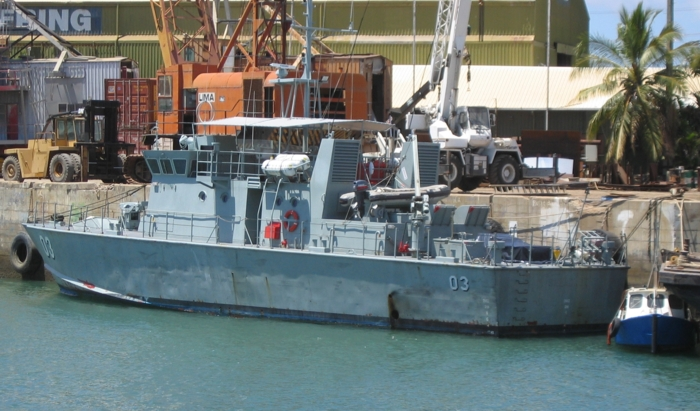
- HMPNGS Seeadler

History

Papua New Guinea
- Name: Seeadler
- Operator: Papua New-Guinea Defence Force
- Launched: 1988
- Decommissioned: 18 April 2021
- Identification: MMSI number: 553111228; Callsign: P2DN
- Status: Ship in active service

General characteristics
- Class & type: Pacific Forum-class patrol boat
- Displacement: 162 tons
- Length: 103 feet (31 m)

HMPNGS Seeadler (P03) is one of four Pacific Forum patrol vessels operated by the Papua New-Guinea Defence Force.

Australia designed and delivered twenty-two Pacific Forum vessels to twelve of her maritime neighbours, between 1987 and 1997. Australia provided these vessels to Papua New-Guinea, and eleven other of its Pacific Ocean neighbours so they could police their exclusive economic zones, because that improves its own security. The Royal Australian Navy regularly participates in joint exercises with their Papuan New-Guinea opposite numbers.

The duties of Seeadler, and her sister ships, include fishery patrol.

In 2013 The Australian described Papua New Guinea's fleet of Pacific Forum vessels as "a neglected component of the PNGDF"—one rarely visited by Australian liaison officers.

In 2014 James Movick, Director-General of the Forum Fisheries Agency, noted that five of the six boarding operations executed by Seeadler during the 2014 iteration of Operation Kurukuru, found potential infringements of the Pacific Forum's fisheries agreements. He called Seeadler's performance "outstanding". In 2014 EMTV reported that vessels like Seeadler were rarely able to put to sea, due to shortages of fuel, and maintenance issues. Seeadler crew members described her as too small for high seas.

On 23 December 2016 Seeadler was on a joint operation with elements of the Australian Maritime Border Command when she fired upon a Vietnamese fishing vessel that had been poaching sea cucumbers. According to The National Seeadler fired "explosive bullets" at one of three poaching vessels, which then exploded, killing her captain, sinking the vessel, and inflicting serious burns on other crew members. The incident took place near Milne Bay.

Papua New Guinea is scheduled to start replacing her Pacific Forum ships, with larger and more capable Guardian-class patrol boats, starting in late 2018.

On 18 April 2021 Papua New-Guinea Defence Force decommissioned its last three ships of the class, including Seeadler.

== Sister ships ==
- HMPNGS Rabaul (P01)
- HMPNGS Dreger (P02)
- HMPNGS Moresby (P04)
