= Josie Tamate =

Niuean civil servant

- Born: Niue
- Occupation: civil servant
- Title: Chair of the Western and Central Pacific Fisheries Commission
- Term: Reappointed to 2-year term in December 2024

Josie M. Tamate is a Niuean civil servant and former Director-General of the Ministry of Natural Resources of the Government of Niue. In December 2022, she was appointed Chair of the Western and Central Pacific Fisheries Commission (WCPFC), the governing body for the world's largest tuna fishery. Tamate is the first Polynesian to serve as WCPFC Chair.

== Early life and education ==
Born and raised in Niue, Tamate completed tertiary studies in Australia and received a master's degree in Economics of Development from Australian National University in 1998. In 2013 she earned a PhD from the University of Wollongong, focusing her doctoral thesis on Pacific tuna fisheries, regionalism and the experience of the Parties to the Nauru Agreement.

== Career ==
Tamate started her career as an economist with the Government of Niue, where she discovered the tuna fisheries sector, including management and geopolitical aspects. She also worked as a policy adviser for the government and an economist for the Forum Fisheries Agency, before serving as Director-General of the Ministry of Natural Resources of Niue from 2014 to 2023.

In December 2018, she was appointed vice-chair of the WCPFC, and in December 2022, she was selected to be the sixth Chair of the WCPFC at its 19th annual meeting in Da Nang, Vietnam, becoming the first Polynesian to hold this position.
