= USCGC Oliver Henry =

US Coast Guard Sentinel-class cutter

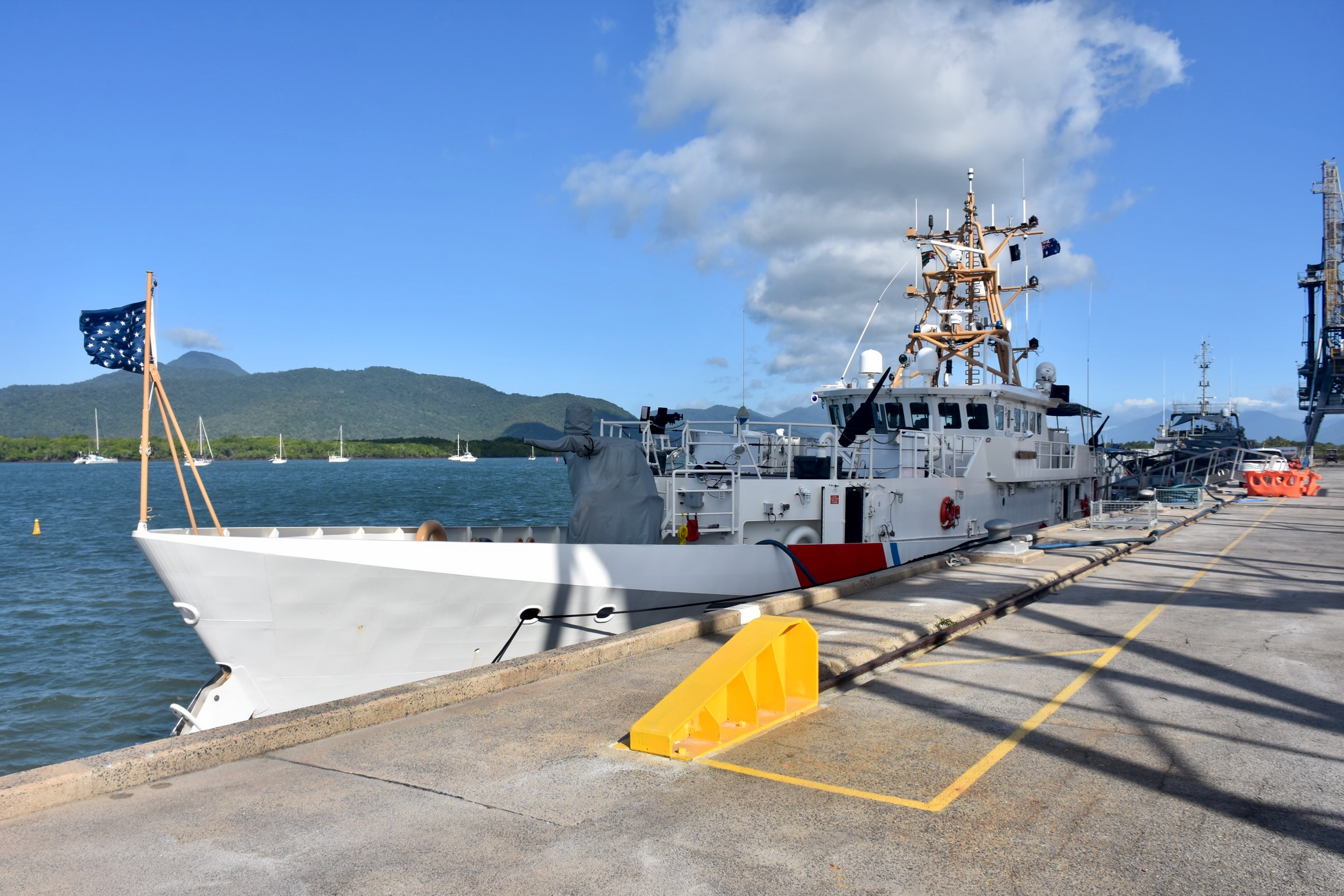
- Oliver Henry shortly after arriving in Cairns, Australia

History

United States
- Name: USCGC Oliver Henry
- Namesake: William C. Hart
- Operator: United States Coast Guard
- Builder: Bollinger Shipyards, Lockport, Louisiana
- Acquired: December 1, 2020
- Commissioned: July 2021
- Home port: Santa Rita, Guam
- Identification: MMSI number: 338926440; Callsign: NBNB; Hull number: WPC-1140
- Status: in active service
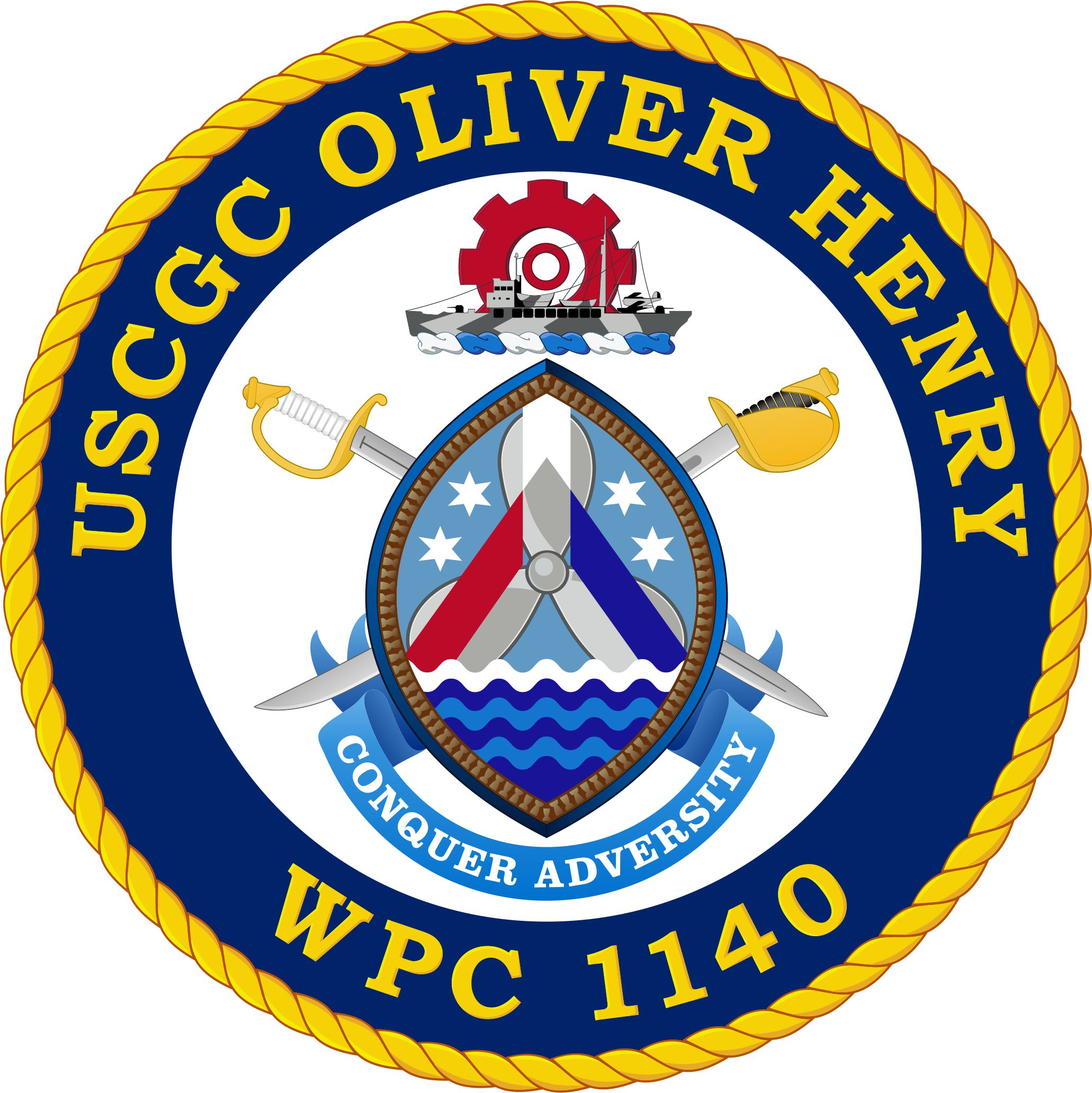
- Badge

General characteristics
- Class & type: Sentinel-class cutter
- Displacement: 353 long tons (359 t)
- Length: 46.8 m (154 ft)
- Beam: 7.6 m (25 ft)
- Depth: 2.9 m (9.5 ft)
- Propulsion: 2 × 4,300 kW (5,800 shp); 1 × 75 kW (101 shp) bow thruster
- Speed: 28 knots (52 km/h; 32 mph)
- Range: 2,500 nautical miles (4,600 km; 2,900 mi)
- Endurance: 5 days
- Boats & landing craft carried: 1 × Short Range Prosecutor RHIB
- Complement: 4 officers, 20 crew
- Sensors & processing systems: L-3 C4ISR suite
- Armament: 1 × Mk 38 Mod 2 25 mm automatic gun; 4 × crew-served Browning M2 machine guns

USCGC Oliver Henry (WPC-1140) is the 40th Sentinel-class cutter built for the United States Coast Guard. She is the second of three Fast Response Cutters homeported in Santa Rita, Guam.

== Operational history ==
Oliver Henry arrived in Santa Rita, Guam after a 10,620 nautical mile journey from Key West, Florida, on September 19, 2022. During her voyage, she also partook in drug interception operations as well as searching for a fishing vessel off of Saipan. Some of Oliver Henry's descendants attended the acceptance ceremony of the ship.

Between August and September 2022, she did an expeditionary patrol around Australia, Papua New Guinea, the Solomon Islands, and Micronesia, patrolling the Exclusive Economic Zones (EEZ) of each country. She patrolled for over 8,000 nautical miles between Apia and Cairns, Australia over a period of 43 days. In Papua New Guinea, her crew engaged with local authorities at HMPNGS Tarangau School, in Australia her crew met up with the mayor of Cairns, then took part in a multinational exercise alongside Australian and Fijian vessels. On her way back she made a stop in Pohnpei and hosted American embassy staff.

Between September and October 2023, she partook in Operation Rematau as a part of Operation Blue Pacific, operating a 28-day patrol around Micronesia's EEZ for 4,986 nautical miles. She also delivered supplies to the villages of Chuuk and Yap.

Between February 20–27, she took part in a patrol as a part of Operation Blue Pacific around the Marshall Islands, delivering supplies to Wotje Atoll.

On September 2, 2024, she completed another patrol around Micronesia as part of Operation Rematau. During the patrol she rescued six fisherman off of Satawal when their vessel broke down.

== Namesake ==
Like the other vessels in her class, she is named after an individual in the Coast Guard who distinguished themselves in the line of duty. She is named for Oliver T. Henry Jr., an African American Coast Guardsman who is credited with the process of desegregation of the then segregated service.
