= Blue Pacific =

Blue Pacific may refer to:

- Blue Pacific (album), a 1990 album by Michael Franks
- Blue Pacific (Streeton), an 1890 painting by Arthur Streeton
- Operation Blue Pacific, a United States-led maritime security and law enforcement campaign

== See also ==
- ASCI Blue Pacific, a supercomputer
- Operation Blue Pacific
- Partners in the Blue Pacific
