= U.S. Bilateral Maritime Law Enforcement Agreements with Pacific Island Countries =

United States bilateral maritime law enforcement agreements, commonly known as "shiprider” agreements, are an umbrella term for agreements on maritime security cooperation between the United States and Pacific Island Countries (PICs). While each of these agreements are uniquely tailored, the overall purpose of these are to allow law enforcement officers from PICs to embark U.S. Coast Guard vessels using these as a platform to conduct maritime law enforcement operations within their Exclusive Economic Zones (EEZs).

As of 2025, the U.S. maintains “shiprider” agreements with twelve PICs supporting efforts on maritime surveillance, countering of Illegal Unreported and Unregulated (IUU) fishing, human trafficking, irregular migration and transnational crime throughout the South Pacific region.

== Recent developments ==
In 2022 the Federated States of Micronesia (FSM) signed a first-of-its-kind expanded “shiprider” agreement allowing the U.S. Coast Guard to take enforcement action on the country's behalf even without a FSM officer on board. Instead, this is done through a process of remote coordination and real-time permission from FSM authorities. In 2023 Palau signed a similar addendum allowing U.S. Coast Guard personnel to directly enforce Palau's fisheries and maritime regulations in Palauan waters without a Palauan ”shiprider” present on the vessel. Likewise, Samoa signed in 2024 an addendum to its "shiprider" agreement enabling the U.S. Coast Guard to conduct boardings in Samoa's EEZ upon request, thus extending enforcement coverage when Samoan officers are unavailable.

== Participating countries ==
As of 2025, the United States has signed “shiprider” agreements with the following twelve PICs: the Cook Islands, Federated States of Micronesia (FSM), Fiji, Kiribati, Nauru, Palau, Papua New Guinea (PNG), Republic of the Marshall Islands, Samoa, Tonga, Tuvalu, and Vanuatu.

=== Cook Islands ===
In November 2007, The Cook Islands became the first PIC to sign a “shiprider” agreement with the United States. The Agreement permits Cook Islands law enforcement officers to be embarked on U.S. Coast Guard vessels using these to board, search, and if necessary detain ships violating Cook Islands laws within the Cook Islands’ 1.8 million km^{2} EEZ.

=== Republic of Palau ===
In 2013 Palau and the United States signed an agreement on maritime law enforcement to enhance surveillance of Palau's 600,000 km^{2} EEZ. The agreement allowed Palauan law enforcement officers to embark on U.S. vessels and empowered them to lead boardings of vessels suspected of violating for example fishing regulations. In August 2023, Palau signed an expanded law enforcement agreement with the U.S., enabling U.S. Coast Guard personnel to enforce Palauan laws in Palau's EEZ on behalf of Palau without a Palauan officer on board.

=== Federated States of Micronesia ===
Signed in May 2008, the "shiprider" agreement between the U.S. and the Federated States of Micronesia (FSM) allow FSM National Police officers to ride aboard U.S. Coast Guard cutters enabling joint law enforcement patrols over the country's vast EEZ. In 2022 this agreement was expanded by establishing a mechanism for the U.S. Coast Guard to act directly against illegal fishing or other maritime threats in FSM waters with remote approval from FSM authorities on shore, even when no FSM officer is physically on the U.S. vessel.

=== Republic of the Marshall Islands ===
On August 5, 2008, the Republic of the Marshall Islands (RMI) signed an agreement on maritime surveillance and interdiction with the United States. This agreement permits Marshallese law enforcement officers to embark on U.S. Coast Guard vessels to conduct law enforcement in its waters.

=== Nauru ===
In September 2011, the Republic of Nauru and the U.S. signed a bilateral maritime law enforcement agreement allowing Nauruan Department of Fisheries and police officers to ride aboard U.S. Coast Guard cutters or U.S. Navy ships to counter illicit activities within Nauru's territorial waters and EEZ. In recent years, Nauruan “shipriders” have participated in Operation Rai Balang and other multilateral patrols coordinated by the FFA, often alongside U.S. assets, to ensure that fishing in Nauru's EEZ is properly monitored and regulated.

=== Tonga ===
Signed in 2010, the “shiprider” agreement between the Kingdom of Tonga and the U.S. enables Tongan law enforcement officers to embark on U.S. Coast Guard and Navy vessels using these as platforms to conduct maritime law enforcement within and around Tonga's 700,000 km^{2} EEZ.

=== Vanuatu ===
In October 2016, The United States and Vanuatu signed a bilateral maritime law enforcement agreement making Vanuatu the tenth PIC to sign such “shiprider” agreement. The agreement permits Vanuatu law enforcement officers and fisheries inspectors to ride aboard U.S. Coast Guard and U.S. Navy vessels to patrol Vanuatu's app. 680,000 km^{2} EEZ.

=== Kiribati ===
On November 24, 2008, Kiribati signed a bilateral maritime enforcement agreement, with the United States granting Kiribati Police Service and Fisheries officers the authority to embark on U.S. vessels and enforce Kiribati's laws in the country's 3.5 million km^{2} EEZ.

=== Tuvalu ===
In 2011 Tuvalu signed an agreement with the U.S. on “Operational cooperation on to suppress illicit transnational maritime activity” – a “shiprider” agreement enabling Tuvaluan law enforcement officers to ride aboard U.S. Coast Guard cutters and U.S. Navy vessels to conduct maritime law enforcement in Tuvalu's 750,000 km^{2} EEZ.

=== Fiji ===
Fiji signed a Shiprider Agreement with the United States in 2018. The agreement allows Fijian law enforcement officers – primarily from the Fiji Fisheries Department – to embark on U.S. Coast Guard vessels or U.S. Navy ships to conduct maritime law enforcement Fijian territorial waters. In late 2019 and 2020, Fijian officers joined patrols on U.S. cutters to monitor high-seas pockets adjacent to Fiji's EEZ for IUU fishing activity. In addition to fisheries enforcement, Fiji has utilized the partnership for boarding vessels suspected of drug smuggling through the South Pacific

=== Samoa ===
The Independent State of Samoa signed its initial Bilateral Maritime Law Enforcement Agreement with the U.S. in 2012. This agreement allowed Samoan police and fisheries officers to participate in joint patrols with the U.S., boarding vessels in Samoa's EEZ (about 120,000 km^{2}) under Samoan authority. In April 2024, Samoa and the United States signed an important addendum to this 2012 agreement, upgrading it to an “enhanced” shiprider arrangement^{14}. The addendum, permits the U.S. Coast Guard to conduct maritime law enforcement in Samoa's EEZ without a Samoan officer on board, upon request by the Samoan government.

=== Papua New Guinea ===
Papua New Guinea (PNG) became the most recent Pacific country to formalize a maritime law enforcement agreement with the United States. In May 2023, the U.S. and PNG signed a Bilateral Defense Cooperation Agreement enabling PNG law enforcement officers to embark on U.S. vessels, and reciprocally authorizing U.S. Coast Guard personnel (with PNG approval) to board vessels to enforce PNG's laws. In late 2023, PNG celebrated its first joint patrol with U.S. Coast Guard involvement during Operation Kurukuru, where U.S. and PNG teams coordinated to monitor fishing vessels in PNG's EEZ as part of the wider campaign Operation Blue Pacific.
