= Manumatavai Tupou-Roosen =

Tongan civil servant

- Born: Tonga
- Other names: Manumatavai Tupou
- Occupation: Civil servant
- Known for: Director General of the Pacific Islands Forum Fisheries Agency from 2018 to the present

Manumatavai Tupou-Roosen is the first woman to be appointed the Director General of the Pacific Islands Forum Fisheries Agency, having taken up the role in 2018. She replaced James Movick and was promoted to this position after serving as the head of the Agency's legal services department. She is currently the Acting Deputy Vice -Chancellor and Vice-president for Regional Campuses and Global Engagement at the University of the South Pacific

Tupou is a citizen of Tonga. She earned her undergraduate degree and a Master of Law degree, in New Zealand, at the University of Auckland and the University of Canterbury. Tupou was awarded a Commonwealth Scholarship, and used it to study Law at the University of Nottingham. Tupou first visited the Pacific Islands Forum Fisheries Agency while working on her PhD, and decided that is where she should work.
