= Seeadler =

Seeadler (German for White-tailed eagle, resp. the Genus Haliaeetus) may refer to:

== Vessels ==
- DFS Seeadler, German flying boat sailplane
- HMPNGS Seeadler, patrol vessel of the Papua New Guinean Maritime Component
- SMS Seeadler (1892), German cruiser
- SMS Seeadler (1915), German merchant raider

== Other uses ==
- Seeadler Harbor, a harbor on Manus Island, Papua New Guinea

== See also ==
- Seeadler-class fast attack craft
