= South Pacific Tuna Treaty =

Treaty on Fisheries between the Governments of Certain Pacific Island States and the Government of the United States of America
- Signed: 2 April 1987
- Location: Port Moresby, Papua New Guinea
- Effective: 15 June 1988
- Condition: 4 ratifications
- Parties: 17
- Depositary: Government of Papua New Guinea

The South Pacific Tuna Treaty, formally the Treaty on Fisheries between the Governments of Certain Pacific Island States and the Government of the United States of America, is a fisheries treaty agreement between the United States and 16 Pacific Island countries. The treaty was signed in 1987, entered into force in 1988, was extended in 1993, 2002, 2016, and again in 2024, currently lasting until 2033 unless otherwise extended. It allows for United States fishing vessels to fish in the exclusive economic zones of the other party states.

The parties to the treaty are:

- Australia
- Cook Islands
- Federated States of Micronesia
- Fiji
- Kiribati
- Marshall Islands
- Nauru
- New Zealand
- Niue
- Palau
- Papua New Guinea
- Samoa
- Solomon Islands
- Tonga
- Tuvalu
- United States
- Vanuatu

The area covered by the treaty contains the largest and most valuable tuna fisheries in the world, on which many Pacific Island countries depend as one of their most important natural resources.

== See also ==
- Pacific Islands Forum Fisheries Agency
