= Rhea Moss-Christian =

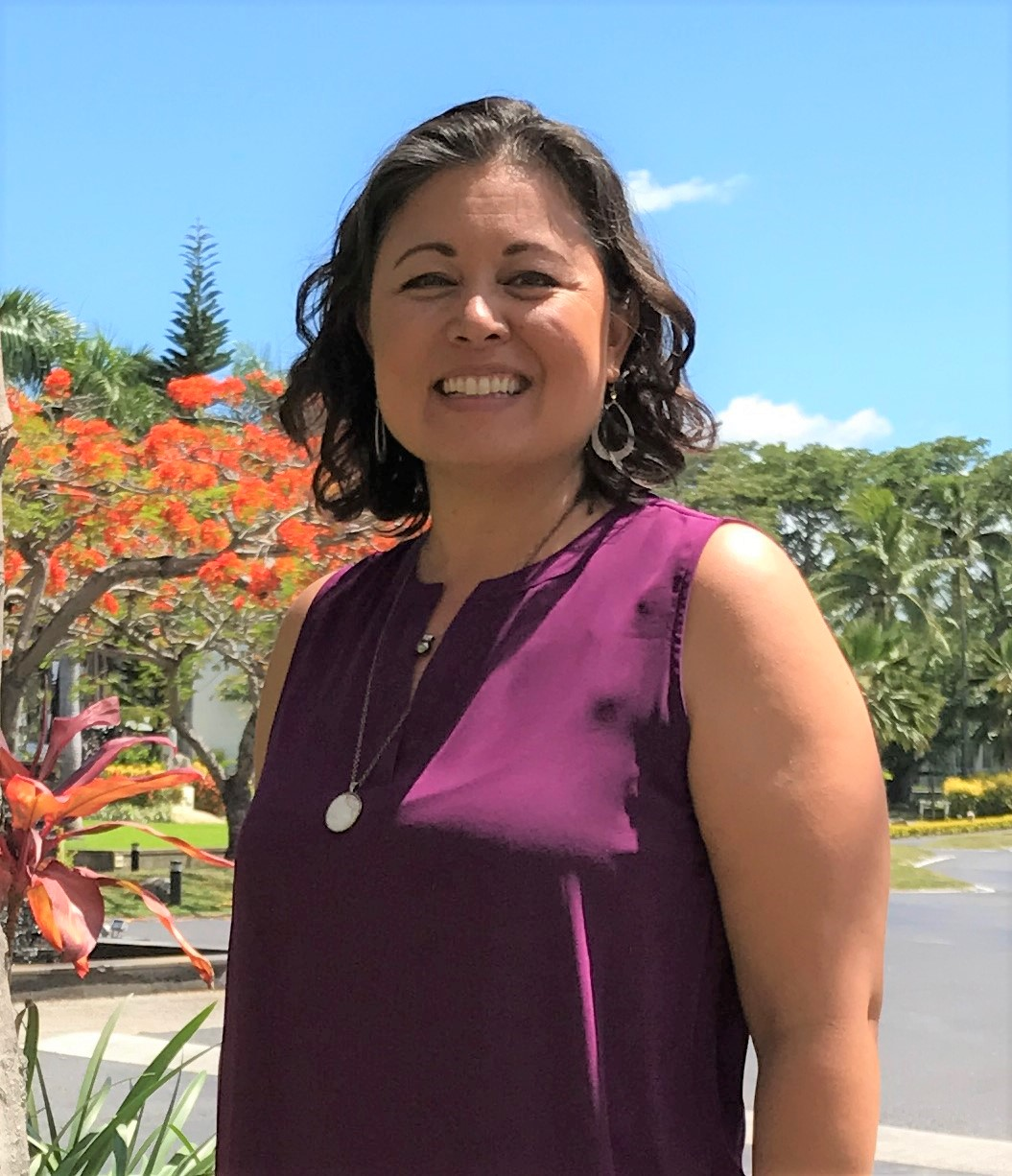
- Born: 31 August 1974 (age 52)
- Education: Stanford University, Oxford University, University of California
- Title: Executive Director of the Western and Central Pacific Fisheries Commission
- Term: Appointed to 4-year term in Dec 2022
- Spouse: Christopher Christian
- Children: 1

Rhea Medine Moss-Christian (born 31 August 1974) is the executive director and former chair of the Western and Central Pacific Fisheries Commission (WCPFC), the governing body for the world's largest tuna fishery, which conserves and manages fish stocks across the western and central Pacific Ocean. She was the first woman to hold either of these roles. She previously chaired the Marshall Islands National Nuclear Commission and advised the Marshall Islands Government on oceans and trade.

== Early life and education ==
Born in the Marshall Islands, Moss-Christian commenced her career in fisheries by assisting the Marshall Islands Government in regional fisheries meetings and United Nations negotiations.

Moss-Christian holds a Master of Arts in International Policy Studies, 2005 (Stanford University), a Post-Graduate Certificate in Diplomatic Studies, 2000 (Oxford University) and a Bachelor of Arts majoring in Politics, 1996 (University of California Santa Cruz). When working towards her degree at the University of California Santa Cruz, she became interested in fisheries.

== Career ==
Moss-Christian moved to Majuro in 1996 and was chosen to represent the Marshall Islands at the 30th Forum Fisheries Committee.

Moss-Christian made history in December 2014 as the first woman to be elected as chair of the Western and Central Pacific Fisheries Commission and was then elected to a second two-year term in December 2016, which was reported as a testament to the respect she had won from Commission members. The Commission membership includes all the major fishing nations from Europe, Asia and North America, as well as developing Pacific nations such as Indonesia and the Philippines.

Moss-Christian and WCPFC Executive Director, Feleti Teo, have been notable for guiding Commission members to achieve more progress by setting realistic goals, given that member countries have different interests and perspectives. At the Commission's 2016 annual meeting, Moss-Christian highlighted the need to develop a harvest strategy, review conservation and management measures for key tunas such as Bigeye and Bluefin, mitigate bycatch and address the safety of commercial fishing boat observers who ensure Commission rules are being followed.

Moss-Christian was appointed chairperson of the Marshall Islands National Nuclear Commission in early 2018.
