= Regional Fisheries Surveillance Centre =

Aspect of the Pacific Islands Forum Fisheries Agency

The Pacific Islands Forum's Forum Fisheries Agency maintains a Regional Fisheries Surveillance Centre in Honiara, Solomon Islands. In 1982, the United Nations Convention on the Law of the Sea gave all maritime nations, including the smaller Pacific Ocean nations, 200-nautical miles Exclusive Economic Zones (EEZ). Monitoring their EEZs is a challenge for some of the smaller nations, where their maritime zones dwarf their landmass, making cooperation essential.

Member nations second officials to work at the Centre.

Since 2005 the Centre has coordinated an annual Operation Kurukuru, where member nations board and inspect suspicious fishing vessels.

In recent years larger nations, like Australia and New Zealand, have allocated aerial surveillance assets to fisheries monitoring.
