= Milne Bay =

Bay of the Solomon Sea on the coast of New Guinea

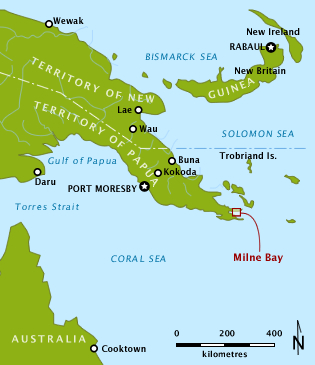
- Location of Milne Bay

- Location within Papua New Guinea
- Location: Milne Bay Province
- Coordinates: 10°24′S 150°33′E
- Type: Bay
- Ocean/sea sources: Solomon Sea
- Basin countries: Papua New Guinea
- Max. length: 35 km (22 mi)
- Max. width: 15 km (9.3 mi)
- Surface area: 525 km^{2} (202.7 sq mi)
- Settlements: Alotau

Milne Bay is a large bay in Milne Bay Province, south-easternmost Papua New Guinea. More than 35 km (22 mi) long and over 15 km (9 mi) wide, Milne Bay is a sheltered deep-water harbor accessible via Ward Hunt Strait. It is surrounded by the heavily wooded Stirling Range to the north and south, and on the northern shore, a narrow coastal strip, soggy with sago and mangrove swamps. The bay is named after Sir Alexander Milne.

== History ==
- Surveyed by Luis Vaez de Torres in July 1606.
- Surveyed by Captain Owen Stanley, R.N. F.R.S. in 1850.

=== World War II ===
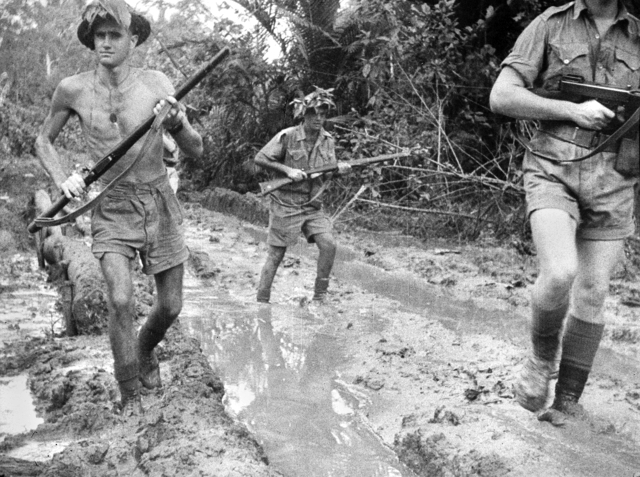
Australian troops at Milne Bay, 1 October 1942

During World War II, the area was the site of the Battle of Milne Bay in 1942 and by late 1943 it became the major support base, Naval Base Milne Bay, for the New Guinea campaign through the development of Finschhafen as an advanced base after that area was secured in the Huon Peninsula campaign. By January 1944 about 140 vessels were in harbor due to congestion at the facilities.

Congestion was relieved by opening of a port at Finschhafen and extensive improvements at Milne Bay. Malaria was a major problem in New Guinea and Milne Bay was particularly hard hit with incidents of the disease hitting at a rate of 4,000 cases per 1,000 troops per year and estimated 12,000 man-days a month lost time.

There were three planes ditched off the island in 1943, a P-38H Lightning, a P-38F Lightning, and a B-24D Liberator "The Leila Belle" (MIA).

=== 21st century ===
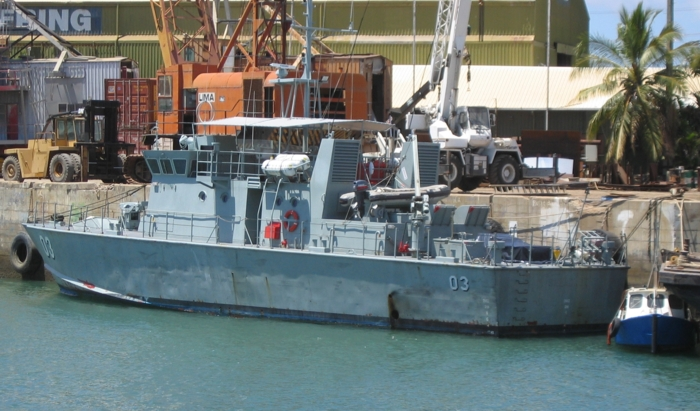
HMPNGS Seeadler sank a poacher in 2016.

HMPNGS Seeadler fired upon a Vietnamese fishing vessel on 23 December 2016. Her captain died, and the poacher sank.

== See also ==
- Battle of Buna–Gona
- Milne Force
- Operation Lilliput

== Gallery ==
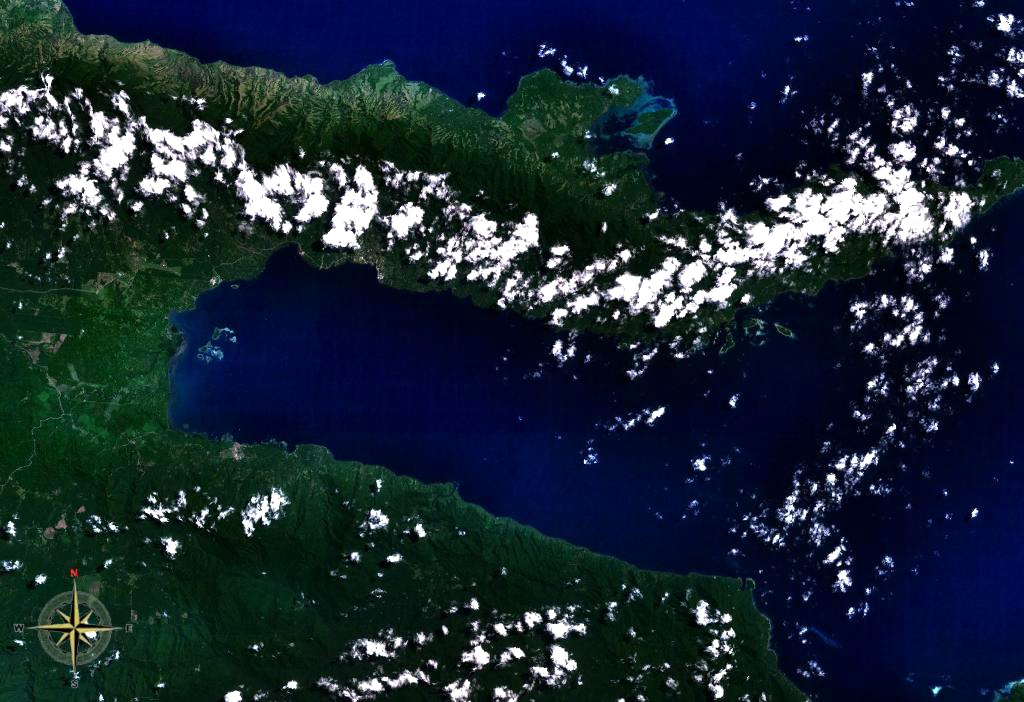
Milne Bay seen from space.

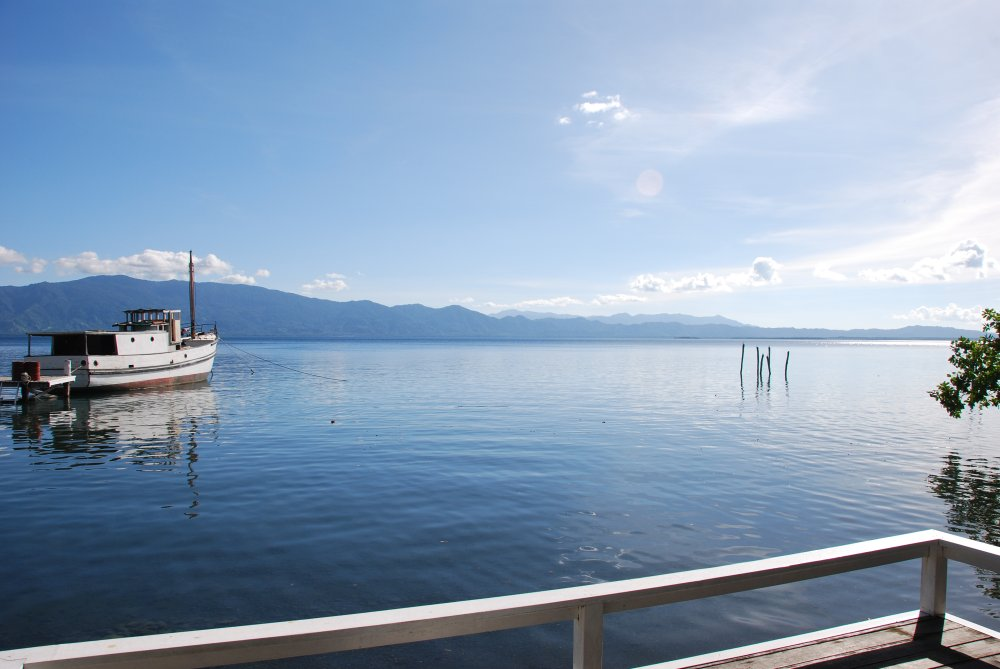
Milne Bay from Alotau.

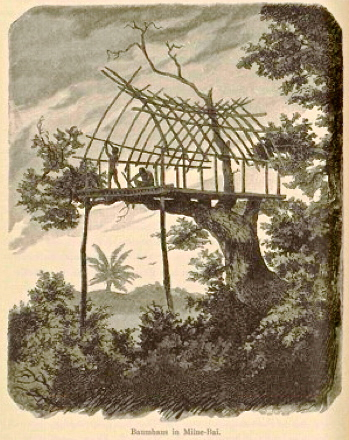
Treehouse, in 1884-1885

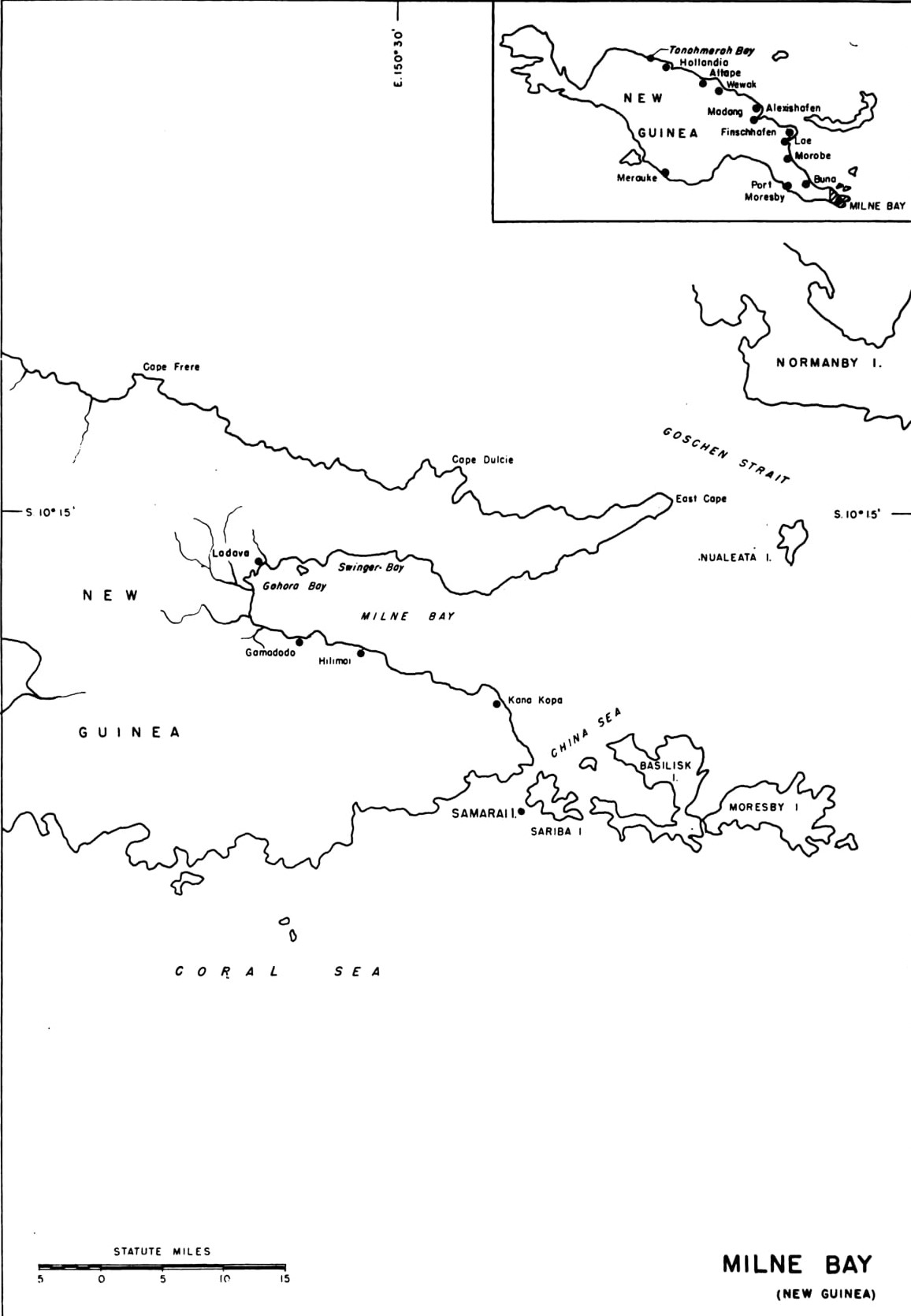
Map of the bay
