= Oliver Henry (USCG) =

United States Coast Guardsman

CWO 4 Oliver T. Henry Jr.
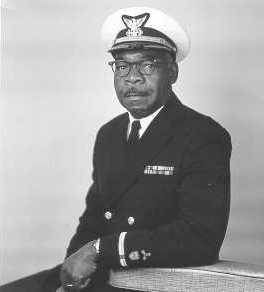
- Warrant Officer Oliver Henry in 1952.
- Born: 1921; Winterville, North Carolina
- Died: 1987 (aged 65–66)
- Other name: Oliver Tony Henry Jr.
- Occupations: mechanic, sailor, administrator
- Known for: U.S. Coast Guard's first black motor machinist mate

Oliver Henry was a Coast Guardsman who served from 1940 to 1966 in the United States Coast Guard. When Henry enlisted in the Coast Guard, the United States Armed Forces were still racially segregated so he served as a mess steward, an all black rating. He was the first African American enlisted Coast Guardsman to transfer from the mess steward rating to another rating. He was transferred to the motor machinist mate rating – related to his civilian work as an auto mechanic.

== Personal life ==
Henry was born in 1921, in Winterville, North Carolina. After his high school graduation he worked as an auto mechanic, until he enlisted in the Coast Guard, in 1940.

Henry married Jean Ellen Taylor in the 1950s, and in 1974 his daughter married the first black graduate of the U.S. Coast Guard Academy, Merle J. Smith.

== Coast Guard career ==
After completing basic training he worked as a mess steward aboard USCGC Manhattan and USCGC Champlain. William Thiesen, of the Coast Guard Historian's Office, noted that during segregation, when all black sailors served as mess stewards, mess stewards could not be promoted to petty officer rank.

In 1941 Henry was transferred to USCGC Northland, and it was during the four years he served aboard Northland that Henry became the Coast Guard's first black machinist mate. In 1942 Northland's executive officer, Lieutenant Commander Carlton Skinner, recommended transferring Henry to the engineering division. He submitted test results showing Henry had excellent qualifications, but bureaucrats in the Coast Guard's personnel administration turned down the request because Henry was "colored". Skinner appealed, and Henry was transferred.

Henry rose quickly through the ranks on Northland, being promoted to chief petty officer in late 1943.

Henry would serve on seven more cutters, after World War II, including USCGC Mackinac.

In 1950 Henry was promoted to warrant officer, and would rise through the warrant officer ranks. Late in his career he served on the Coast Guard's Member Auditing Board and Member Training Board.

== Maritime Administration career ==
Following his career in the Coast Guard Henry joined the U.S. Maritime Administration. When he retired in 1986 he was deputy director of the administration's Southern California office.

== Legacy ==
In 2010, Master Chief Petty Officer of the Coast Guard Charles "Skip" W. Bowen, proposed that all the cutters in the Sentinel class should be named after enlisted Coast Guardsmen, or one of its precursor services, who were recognized for their heroism, or who otherwise represented a model of service that should be emulated. In 2018 the Coast Guard announced Henry would be the namesake of the 40th Sentinel class cutter, USCGC Oliver Henry (WPC-1140).

Oliver Henry was commissioned July 2021 and is stationed at her home port of Santa Rita, Guam, at the maintenance facility named after his mentor, Carlton Skinner.

Henry's descendants attended the commissioning of USCGC Oliver Henry.
