= Western and Central Pacific Fisheries Commission =

Regional fisheries management organisation

- Logo of the Western and Central Pacific Fisheries Commission
- Abbreviation: WCPFC
- Formation: 19 June 2004 (21 years ago)
- Type: Regional fisheries management organisation
- Purpose: Fisheries
- Headquarters: Kolonia, Pohnpei, Federated States of Micronesia
- Coordinates: 6.9666024°N 158.2128149°E
- Region served: Western Pacific Ocean
- Members: 26 state members
- Executive Director: Rhea Moss-Christian
- Website: www.wcpfc.int

The Western and Central Pacific Fisheries Commission (WCPFC) is a regional fisheries management organisation established to conserve and manage tuna and other highly migratory fish stocks across the western and central areas of the Pacific Ocean. Its full name is Commission for the Conservation and Management of Highly Migratory Fish Stocks in the Western and Central Pacific Ocean. It commenced operations in late 2005, and its secretariat is based in Pohnpei, in the northern Pacific state of the Federated States of Micronesia.

It was established by the international treaty Convention on the Conservation and Management of Highly Migratory Fish Stocks in the Western and Central Pacific Ocean (WCPF Convention), which entered into force on 19 June 2004. The WCPF Convention is the second regional fisheries management agreement negotiated since the conclusion of the 1995 U.N. Fish Stocks Agreement.

== Operation ==
The WCPF Convention was based on the 1995 UN Fish Stocks Agreement, and addressed the specific characteristics of the western and central Pacific Ocean. It established a framework for the participation of fishing entities legally binding them to its provisions. Territories and possessions can participate in the work of the Commission, which also cooperates with fisheries in other regions whose competence overlaps with WCPFC. Cooperation with the Inter-American Tropical Tuna Commission is of particular importance because of the overlap in respective Convention Areas and the wide range of some of the stocks (such as Bigeye tuna, and the two Albacore Tuna stocks) jointly managed by WCPFC and IATTC. The High Seas of the WCPFC Convention Area also overlaps with the South Pacific Regional Fisheries Management Organisation and the new North Pacific Fisheries Commission Convention Area. However the fish stocks managed by these RFMOs are different from those managed by WCPFC, and interactions are likely to be restricted to those involving bycatch and multipurpose vessels.

The WCPFC Secretariat maintains the Record of Fishing Vessels authorized by their flag States to fish for tuna and other relevant highly migratory fish stocks in the WCPFC Convention Area, manages a Vessel Monitoring System, maintains standards for the national and subregional observer programs that make up the Regional Observer Program, and convenes meetings of the Commission. Primary scientific services are provided under contract by the Oceanic Fisheries Programme of the Pacific Community (SPC), and one of the WCPFC subsidiary bodies - the Northern Committee - also obtains scientific advice from The International Scientific Committee for Tuna and Tuna-Like Species in the North Pacific Ocean (ISC).

On 20 March 2023, the United States Navy and USCG began patrols to implement enforcement of the treaty through agreements with partner nations in the area.

== Governance ==
As established by the Convention, the Commission is the governing body composed of representatives from members, cooperating non-members and participating territories (collectively, CCMs). The Commission holds annual meetings, usually in late November or early December, presided over by a Chair and a Vice-Chair, who are elected from the membership. The Commission held its 19th regular session in late November 2022, in Da Nang, Vietnam. Decisions of the Commission are normally made by consensus, but the Convention also provides for a two-chambered voting mechanism, with member countries of the Pacific Islands Forum Fisheries Agency (FFA) forming one chamber.

The Commission progresses much of its work through three subsidiary bodies: the Scientific Committee (SC), which usually meets in early August; the Northern Committee (NC), which usually meets in early September; and the Technical and Compliance Committee (TCC), which usually meets in late September. The fourth subsidiary body, the Finance and Administrative Committee (FAC), sets the Commission’s budget.

The current chair of the Commission is Dr. Josie Tamate, the former Director-General of the Ministry of Natural Resources of Niue and first Polynesian to chair the WCPFC. She succeeds Jung-re Riley Kim of South Korea, who was simultaneously the chair of the Indian Ocean Tuna Commission, Rhea Moss-Christian of the Marshall Islands, the first female chair of the WCPFC, Charles Karnella of the USA's National Marine Fisheries Service, Satya Nandan of Fiji, who was also the first Secretary-General of the International Seabed Authority, and Glenn Hurry, a former CEO of the Australian Fisheries Management Authority.

Pursuant to Article 15 of the Convention, the Commission established a permanent secretariat headed by an Executive Director who is responsible for implementing the policies and activities of the Commission. The secretariat is located in Kolonia, Pohnpei, Federated States of Micronesia in a building funded by the Chinese government.

In December 2022 at the 19th regular session of the WCPFC in Da Nang, Vietnam, Rhea Moss-Christian was appointed the Executive Director of the Commission, succeeding Feleti Teo of Tuvalu, who served as Executive Director from 2014-2022. Moss-Christian was previously the first woman to serve as chair of the WCPFC from 2014-2018 and subsequently chaired the Marshall Islands National Nuclear Commission. Previous executive directors include Glenn Hurry of Australia (2010-2014), who was also the inaugural chair of the WCPFC, and Andrew Wright of New Zealand (2005-2010), who later served as the executive secretary of the Commission for the Conservation of Antarctic Marine Living Resources.

=== Trust fund ===
In 2023 Taiwan promised to donate two million USD to the WCPFC's trust fund.

== Membership ==
Membership of the Commission is open to the States that participated in negotiating the 2004 Convention. The contracting parties to the Convention, by consensus, may invite States or regional economic integration organizations that wish to fish for highly migratory fish stocks in the western and central Pacific to accede to the Convention. This approach restricts access, emphasizing that the initiative to accede lies with existing parties, not with new applicants.

Commission Members	Participating Territories	Cooperating Non-Members
Australia	American Samoa	Bahamas
Canada	French Polynesia	Curaçao
China	Guam	Ecuador
Cook Islands	New Caledonia	El Salvador
European Union	Northern Mariana Islands	Liberia
Federated States of Micronesia	Tokelau	Panama
Fiji	Wallis and Futuna	Thailand
France		Vietnam
Indonesia		
Japan		
Kiribati		
Marshall Islands		
Nauru		
New Zealand		
Niue		
Palau		
Papua New Guinea		
Philippines		
Samoa		
Solomon Islands		
South Korea		
Taiwan (as Chinese Taipei)		
Tonga		
Tuvalu		
United States		
Vanuatu		

=== Observers ===
- Mexico
- Nicaragua
- United Kingdom
- 25 intergovernmental organisations
- 36 nongovernmental organisations

== Performance of the Commission ==
The status of stocks under the oversight of the Commission is informally summarized in the ISSF Status of Stocks Report.

== Controversy ==
In June 2015 the fisheries ministers of the countries that are parties to the Nauru Agreement met in Palikir, Pohnpei, under the chairmanship of Elisala Pita of Tuvalu, who stated that in 2015 Tuvalu has refused to sell fishing days to certain nations and fleets that have blocked Tuvaluan initiatives to develop and sustain their own fishery. Elisala Pita also said that Tuvalu was disappointed with the outcomes of recent meetings of the WCPFC as some fishing nations had tried to avoid their responsibilities and commitment to sustainable fishing.

== See also ==
- North Pacific Fisheries Commission
- Pacific Community
- Pacific Islands Forum Fisheries Agency
- Inter-American Tropical Tuna Commission
