= Operation Blue Pacific =

US maritime law enforcement campaign

Operation Blue Pacific is a United States-led maritime security and law enforcement campaign focused on the South Pacific region. Its main goal is to strengthen law enforcement efforts in the territorial waters surrounding the Pacific Islands Countries (PICs) and to strengthen maritime domain awareness (MDA) in the region. Under Operation Blue Pacific, the U.S. Coast Guard work alongside PICs to enhance maritime governance, countering illicit maritime activities such as drug smuggling and Illegal, unreported and unregulated fishing (IUU) all within the PICs vast exclusive economic zones (EEZs). The initiative involves regular Coast Guard deployments, capacity-building engagements through bilateral "shiprider" agreements that empower host nation law officers to conduct maritime law enforcement from U.S. Coast Guard vessels.

== Background ==
From the outset, the goals of Operation Blue Pacific have been to promote maritime security, safety, sovereignty, and to support economic prosperity for the PICs. The U.S. Coast Guard District 14 (based in Hawaii) leads efforts in coordination with U.S. Indo-Pacific Command, by deploying cutters and aircraft supporting operations in the region.

== "Shiprider" agreements and participating nations ==
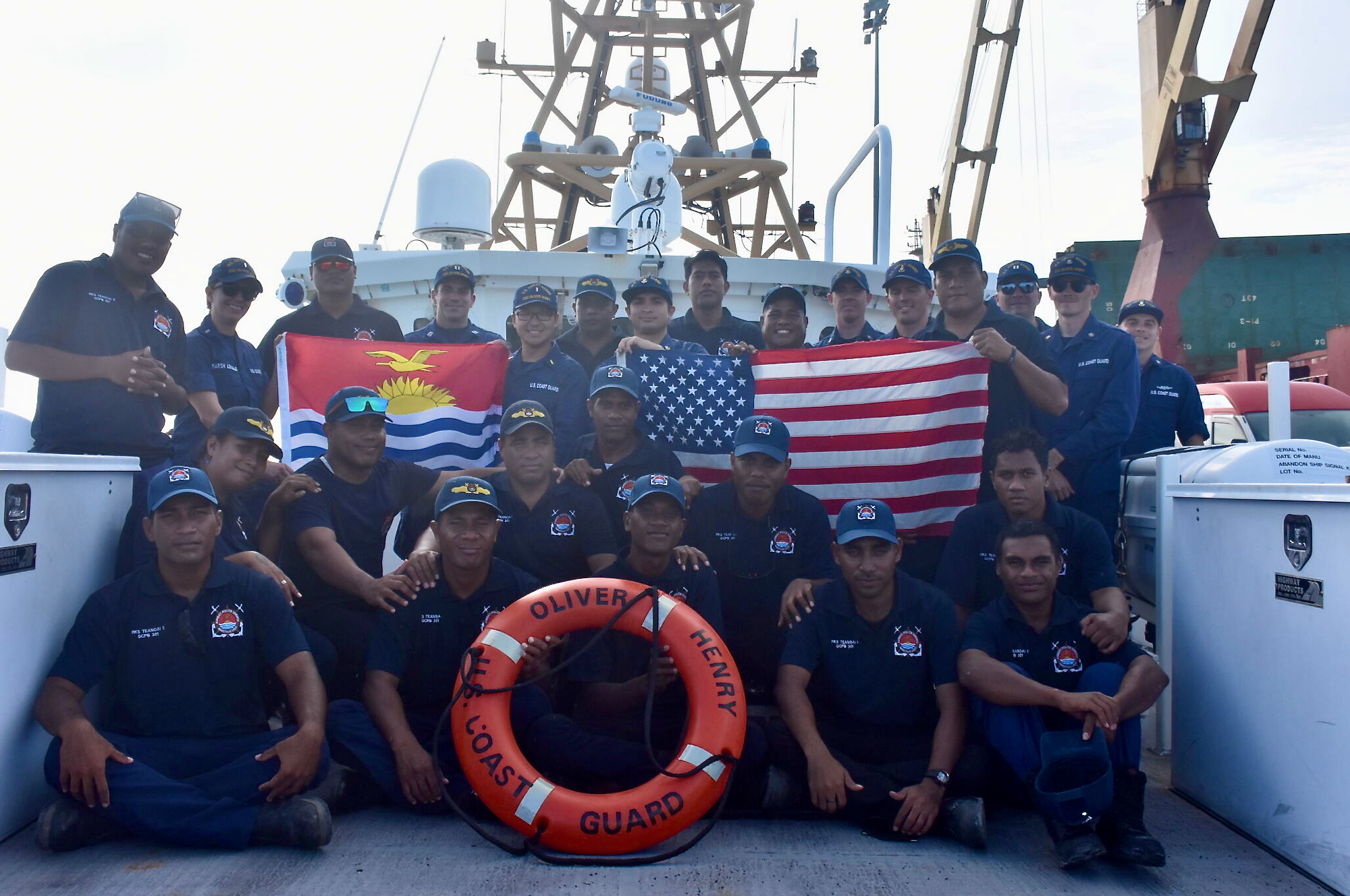
Kiribati Police Maritime Unit (PMU) and crew of the U.S. Coast Guard Cutter Oliver Henry (WPC 1140) crew on patrol in the Kiribati EEZ 2024.

Central to Operation Blue Pacific is the use of bilateral maritime law enforcement agreements, also known as “shiprider” agreements. These agreements allow law enforcement officers from PICs to embark on US Coast Guard Vessels using these as platforms conduct maritime law enforcement operations in their territorial waters and EEZ’s.

As of 2025, the United States has “shiprider” agreements with twelve PICs: the Cook Islands, Federated States of Micronesia (FSM), Fiji, Kiribati, Nauru, Palau, Papua New Guinea (PNG), Republic of the Marshall Islands, Samoa, Tonga, Tuvalu, and Vanuatu.

== Noteworthy missions ==
In August 2024, a U.S. Coast Guard HC-130 Hercules aircraft from Air Station Barbers Point joined the FFA’s Operation Island Chief 2024 as the U.S. contribution under Operation Blue Pacific. Working side-by-side with the Forum Fisheries Agency (FFA), the U.S. crew searched over 232,000 square miles of territorial water and EEZ’s while sharing real-time sightings and intelligence to direct patrol boats to targets.

As part of the overarching Operation Blue Pacific, U.S. cutters and aircraft have also supported Operation Kurukuru, an annual FFA surveillance operation. During Operation Kurukuru 2024, the Coast Guard deployed the Guam-based cutter USCGC Frederick Hatch (WPC-1143) along with a Hawaii-based HC-130.

In 2025 the U.S. Coast Guard cutter ‘Midgett’ became the first U.S. cutter to conduct a dedicated bilateral patrol in Papua New Guinea’s EEZ, embarking PNG officers and patrolling under the 'shiprider' agreement signed in May 2023.
