= William C. Hart =

American soldier

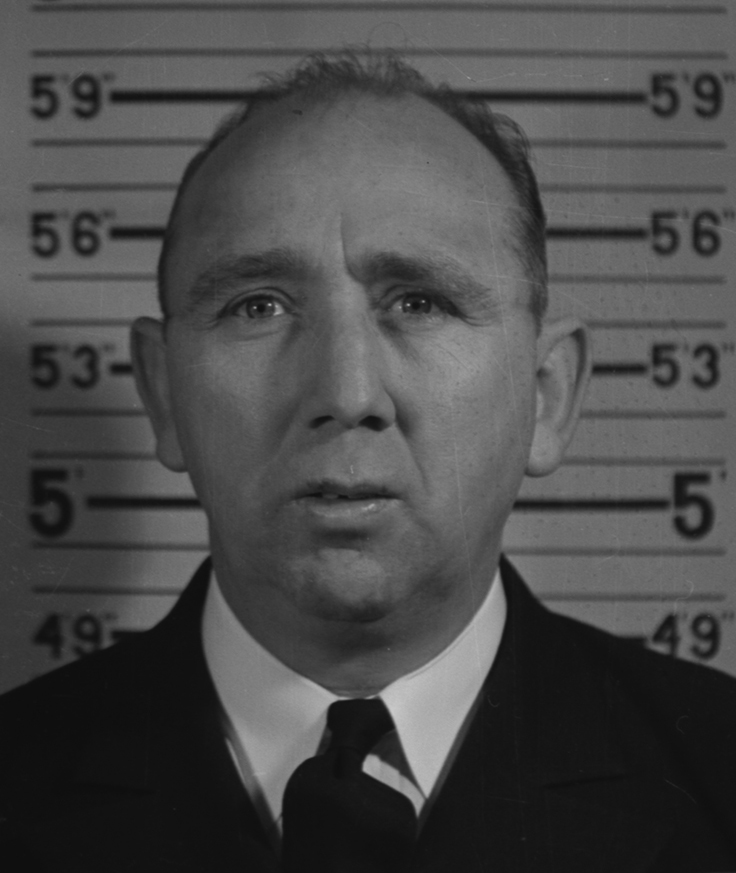
- William C. Hart as a Lieutenant (junior grade)
- Born: May 22, 1898; Philadelphia
- Died: February 12, 1963 (aged 64)
- Occupation: sailor
- Military career
- Allegiance: United States
- Branch: United States Coast Guard
- Service years: 1924-1932, 1939-1950
- Rank: LT
- Conflict: World War II
- Awards: Gold Lifesaving Medal

William C. Hart was a sailor in the United States Coast Guard. He first enlisted on September 3, 1924, when he was 26 years old. He was promoted to Boatswain's mate and was in command of CG-213 when it effected a daring rescue of a stranded tugboat in November 1926. During this rescue Hart dived into dangerous seas to rescue a member of the tug's crew who had fallen overboard. According to his Coast Guard biography: "Hart jumped overboard and affected the rescue at great personal risk, as the two vessels were not more than 8 feet apart in the raging seas." For this act of heroism Hart was awarded the Gold Lifesaving Medal. In 1927 his heroism in fighting a gasoline fire earned him a commendation.

In 1933 to 1939 Hart served in the US Army Corps of Engineers, where he rose to warrant officer. He re-enlisted in the Coast Guard in 1939, and was quickly promoted to chief boatswain's mate. When the US entered World War II Hart was promoted to lieutenant. Hart retired from the Coast Guard in 1950.

== Legacy ==
In 2010, Charles "Skip" W. Bowen, who was then the Coast Guard's most senior non-commissioned officer, proposed that all 58 cutters in the Sentinel class should be named after enlisted sailors in the Coast Guard, or one of its precursor services, who were recognized for their heroism. In 2014 the Coast Guard announced that the 34th cutter would be named the USCGC William Hart. The William Hart is homeported in Honolulu.
