= Niue Treaty =

Niue Treaty on Cooperation in Fisheries Surveillance and Law Enforcement in the South Pacific Region
- Signed: 9 July 1992
- Location: Honiara, Solomon Islands
- Effective: 20 May 1993
- Condition: 4 ratifications
- Signatories: 17
- Parties: 14
- Depositary: Government of Niue

The Niue Treaty on Cooperation in Fisheries Surveillance and Law Enforcement in the South Pacific Region or Niue Treaty is a multilateral treaty of members of the Pacific Islands Forum Fisheries Agency to enhance their ability to enforce effectively their fisheries laws, and deter breaches.

Under Article XIII a State which is not a Party to the Forum Fisheries Agency Convention may also accede to the Treaty, if all Parties agree.

== Niue Treaty Multilateral Subsidiary Agreement ==
Bilateral Subsidiary Agreements have been made in the past between individual Niue Treaty signatories in order to give effect to certain Treaty provisions. However, a comprehensive Multilateral Subsidiary Agreement (NTMSA) for strengthening implementation of the Niue Treaty was agreed and finalised for signature in Honiara on 2 November 2012.

The first country to sign the NTMSA was the Republic of Palau on 9 November 2012. The Multilateral Subsidiary Agreement needs 4 instruments of ratifications, acceptance or approval to come into force.

== Ratifications ==
The treaty was signed by (or on behalf of) 17 states/territories; as of 2013, 14 had ratified the treaty:

Country/Territory	Treaty Signature	Treaty Ratification	Subsidiary Agreement Signature	Subsidiary Agreement Ratification	Comment
Australia	9 July 1992	3 March 1993			
Cook Islands	9 July 1992	3 March 1993	(Signed)		New Zealand
Fiji	11 August 1992	5 March 1996			
Kiribati	11 May 1992	13 October 1994			
Marshall Islands	9 July 1992	10 January 1995	(Signed)		
Micronesia, Federated States of	9 July 1992	3 December 1993	(Signed)		
Nauru	9 July 1992	30 September 1993	(Signed)		
New Zealand	9 July 1992				
Niue	9 July 1992	9 March 1993			New Zealand
Palau	9 July 1992	3 March 1999	9 November 2012		
Papua New Guinea	11 May 1993	12 November 1994	(Signed)		
Samoa	9 July 1992	14 May 1994	(Signed)		
Solomon Islands	9 July 1992	27 May 1994			
Tokelau	11 May 1993				New Zealand
Tonga	9 July 1992	20 May 1993	(Signed)		
Tuvalu	9 July 1992		(Signed)		
Vanuatu	9 July 1992	10 November 1993	(Signed)		

== See also ==
- Nauru Agreement
