= Nauru Agreement =

1982 Oceanian subregional fishing agreement

Nauru Agreement Concerning Cooperation in the Management of Fisheries of Common Interest
- Signed: 11 February 1982
- Location: Nauru
- Effective: 4 December 1982
- Parties: Micronesia; Kiribati; The Marshall Islands; Nauru; Palau; Papua New Guinea; Solomon Islands; Tuvalu; Tokelau
- Depositary: Government of the Solomon Islands

The Nauru Agreement Concerning Cooperation in the Management of Fisheries of Common Interest, or The Nauru Agreement is an Oceania subregional agreement between the Federated States of Micronesia, Kiribati, the Marshall Islands, Nauru, Palau, Papua New Guinea, Solomon Islands and Tuvalu. The eight signatories collectively control 25–30% of the world's tuna supply and approximately 60% of the western and central Pacific tuna supply.

Historically, the Nauru Agreement and other joint fishery management Arrangements made by the Parties to the Nauru Agreement (usually referred to as PNA) have been concerned mainly with the management of tuna purse-seine fishing in the tropical western Pacific.

== Institutional arrangements ==
From its initial enactment in 1982, the implementation of the Nauru Agreement was coordinated by the Pacific Islands Forum Fisheries Agency (FFA). However a separate PNA Office was created in 2010, based in Majuro, Marshall Islands. The current (2021) PNA chief executive officer is Dr.Sangaalofa Clark of Kiribati who succeeded Ludwig Kumoru of Papua New Guinea, who in turn succeeded Dr Transform Aqorau of Solomon Islands in 2016.

== Fishing rules ==
In October 2010, the eight member states Parties to the Nauru Agreement (PNA) extended their prohibition on tuna purse-seine fishing in approximately 4.5 million square kilometres of the Pacific Ocean high seas by purse-seine vessels licensed to fish in their combined Exclusive Economic Zones. The extension was unveiled at the 6th meeting of the Technical and Compliance Committee of the Western and Central Pacific Fisheries Commission (WCPFC).

Other recent actions by the Parties to the Nauru Agreement include a prohibition on setting purse-seine nets around whale sharks, a ban on fishing near fish aggregation devices during the months of July, August and September (with an option to extend this for up to an additional three months if scientific advice suggests that tuna stocks would benefit), a requirement for 100% observer coverage aboard purse-seiners, a minimum mesh-size, and a requirement for retention of all catch of tuna on board (no discards).

The full range of fishery management instruments implemented by the Parties to the Nauru Agreement includes:

- The Federated States of Micronesia Arrangement: which defines a multilateral licensing arrangement providing annual access to all PNA EEZs by purse-seine vessels which contribute significantly to the enhancement of a PNA country's (the Home Party) economic involvement in the fishery.
- The Palau Arrangement: which formerly set an agreed, binding, limit on the number of purse-seine vessels allowed to operate in PNA waters. The Palau Arrangement, through the Palau Arrangement Purse-seine Vessel Days Management Scheme, now limits the amount of effort (in terms of number of fishing days) that can be exercised by purse-seine vessels in PNA waters during any one calendar year. A Longline Vessel Days Management Scheme is currently under trial and is planned to be introduced on 1 January 2013.
- The Implementing Arrangements of the Nauru Agreement: There have been three of these, defining the measures that have been agreed by all Parties that will be implemented in the management of the activities of purse-seine vessels in their own EEZs, either through Regulations or licensing conditions. These include the measures highlighted above, such as the requirement not to license any purse-seine vessel which also fishes in certain defined High Seas areas.

These PNA-specific measures are also supplemented by the Harmonized Minimum Terms and Conditions for Access to FFA member EEZs by Foreign Fishing Vessels, agreed by all FFA member countries including the Parties to the Nauru Agreement. These terms and conditions apply to all foreign fishing vessels, not just purse-seiners, and include a requirement for an Automatic Location Communicator to be switched on at all times and reporting to the regional Vessel Monitoring System, minimum standards for reporting to national authorities, and a requirement for annual regional vessel registration.

In May 2012 the PNA Fisheries Ministers met in Alotau, Papua New Guinea, and through a Resolution on Marine Animals. gave their commitment to implement even stronger management measures in their joint EEZs order to maintain sustainable tuna fisheries and minimise impact on bycatch species The new commitments include:

- Establishing a PNA Observer Agency by 1 January 2013 to improve efficiency of national observer programmes in maintaining 100% independent observer coverage aboard purse-seine fishing vessels in PNA waters;
- Adopting the MSC Implementation Plan, including fast-tracking an agreement on Precautionary Reference Points and Harvest Control Rules for the PNA free-school skipjack purse-seine fishery, as required to maintain MSC Certification (see below);
- Approving work on developing a FAD registration and tracking scheme to be trialled in 2013, in collaboration with the Pew Environment Group
- Agreeing an amendment to the Palau Arrangement Purse-seine Vessel Days Management Scheme that provides a clear and unambiguous definition of the Fishing Day. In particular, clarifying that any calendar day in which any fishing activity takes place will be counted as a full fishing day, with limited exemptions for days in which the only activities during that day are bona-fide emergencies, breakdowns, refuelling, repairs, or expeditious transit with fully stowed fishing gear.
- Continuing to advocate within the WCPFC for more effective conservation and management measures to be implemented across the whole Western and Central Pacific region, including the Conservation and Management Measure on Marine Mammals that was proposed in 2010 and 2011.

== PNA Fisheries Ministers meetings ==
At the May 2012 meeting in Alotau, Papua New Guinea, the Fisheries Ministers also approved a PNA Office Business Plan, and welcomed Tokelau as a party to the Palau Arrangement Purse-Seine Vessel Days Management Scheme.

In June 2015 the PNA Fisheries Ministers met in Palikir, Pohnpei, under the chairmanship of Elisala Pita of Tuvalu, which in 2015 has refused to sell fishing days to certain nations and fleets that have blocked Tuvaluan initiatives to develop and sustain their own fishery. Elisala Pita also said that Tuvalu was disappointed with the outcomes of recent meetings of the WCPFC as some fishing nations had tried to avoid their responsibilities and commitment to sustainable fishing.

== MSC certification ==
In December 2011, the PNA purse-seine free-school skipjack fishery was certified according to Marine Stewardship Council standards as being sustainable. This means that products made from skipjack tuna caught from free schools (without setting near Fish Aggregation Devices or other floating objects) by PNA-licensed and product-chain-certified purse-seiners will be eligible for the MSC label. The PNA free-school skipjack purse-seine fishery is one of the largest fisheries certified by the MSC.

Like all such certificates, this approval is issued according to the fulfilment of certain conditions and requirements over the course of its duration.

== PNA Chairpersons ==
Because the PNA is a member-driven institution, the PNA Chair plays a fundamental role, both as spokesperson and as arbiter of consensus within the group. Unlike some other regional organisations, where Chairs are actively occupied only during annual governing council meetings, chairing the PNA requires a significant investment of time throughout the year. The catches taken by the fisheries that are controlled by the standards, rules and decisions agreed between the Parties to the Nauru Agreement are worth several billion US dollars per annum, and decisions may need to be made at any time to sustain these fisheries as new challenges arise. The PNA Chair is selected by Parties annually.

1. (1982) Leonard Maenu'u, SB
2. (1983) J Kairi, PG
3. (1984) Tony Slatyer, FFA
4. (1985) Teken Tokataake, KI
5. (1986) Steve Muller, MH
6. (1987) Don Stewart, NR
7. (1988) Ramon Rechebei, PW
8. (1989) Barney Rongap, PG
9. (1990) Albert Wata, SB
10. (1991) Jesse Raglmar Sublomar, FM
11. (1992) Nakibai Teuatabo, KI
12. (1993) (), MH
13. (1994) Anton Jimwereiy, NR
14. (1995) Ramon Rechebei, PW
15. (1996) ()
16. (1997) (), SB
17. (1998) Elisala Pita, TV
18. (1999) Bernard Thoulag, FM
19. (2000) Kaburoro Ruaia, KI
20. (2001) Danny Wase, MH
21. (2002) Ramon Rechebei, PW
22. (2003) Peter Jacob, NR
23. (2004) Dennis Bebego, PG
24. (2005) Sylvester Diake, SB
25. (2006) Taavau Teii, TV
26. (2007) Bernard Thoulag, FM
27. (2008) Charleston Deiye, NR
28. (2009) Kintoba Tearo, KI
29. (2010) Glen Joseph, MH
30. (2011) Sylvester Pokajam, PG
31. (2012) Nannette Malsol, PW
32. (2013) Dr Christian Ramofafia, SB
33. (2014) Elisala Pita, TV
34. (2015) Secretary Honourable Lorin Roberts, FM
35. (2016) Dr. Naomi Biribo, KI
36. (2017) Glen Joseph, MH
37. (2018) Charleston Deiye, NR
38. (2019) Kathy Sisior, PW
39. (2020) Glen Joseph, MH
40. (2021) Noan David Pakop, PG
41. (2022) Nikolasi Apinelu, TV
42. (2023) Dr Christian Ramofafia, SB
43. (2024) Liman Helgenberger, FM

== Award ==
The PNA was named the Organization of the Year for 2010 by the regional news magazine Islands Business.

PNA earned the Seafood Champion Award for Vision at the Global Seafood Summit in Malta in 2016. According to the Environmental Justice Foundation, PNA earned the award for "seeing the need to manage the Western and Central Pacific tuna fishery for the long term and quickly taking effective action".

== See also ==
- Niue Treaty
