= USCGC William Hart =

United States Coast Guard Vessel

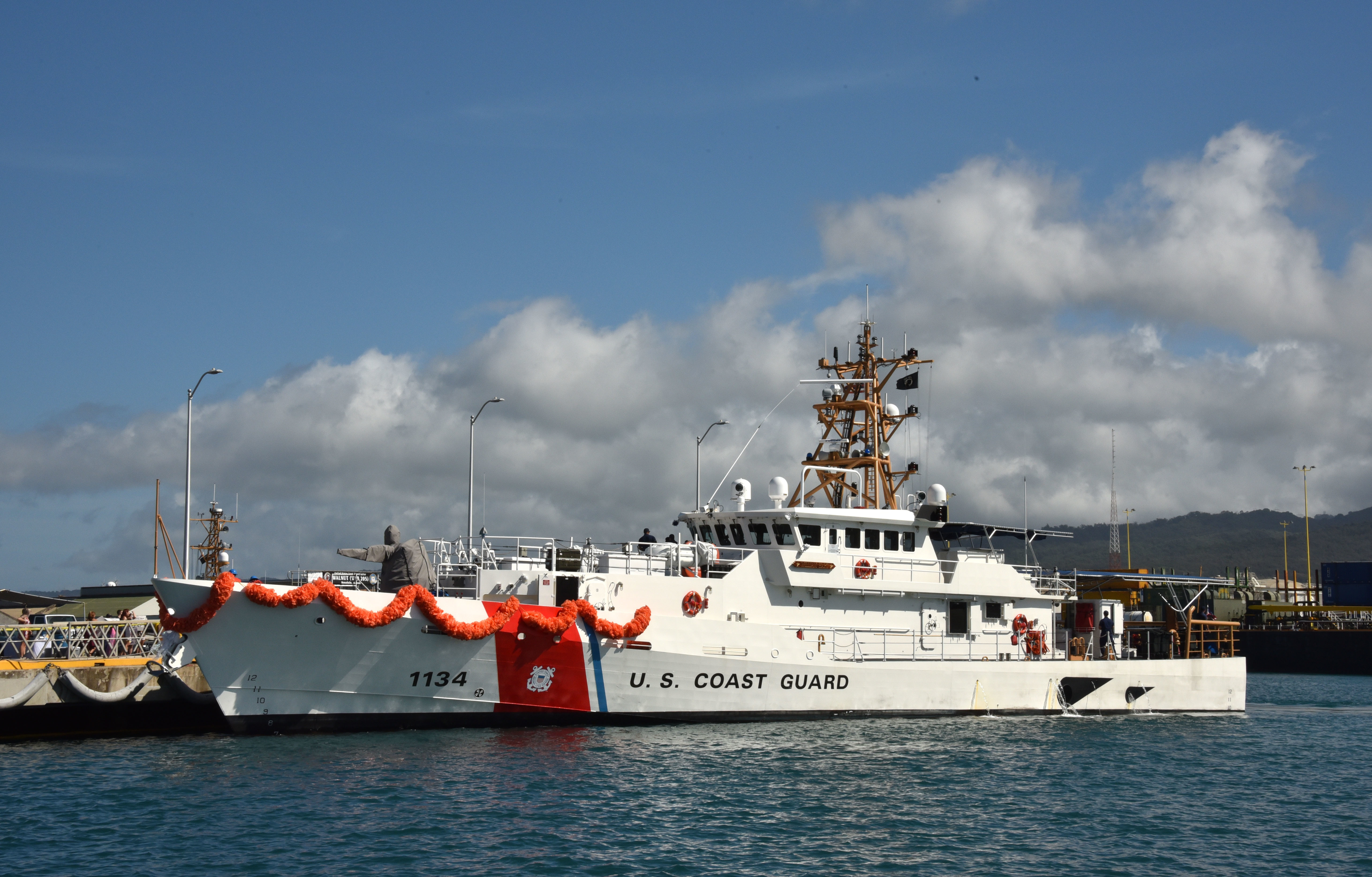
- William Hart moored in Honolulu

History

United States
- Name: USCGC William Hart
- Namesake: William C. Hart
- Operator: United States Coast Guard
- Builder: Bollinger Shipyards, Lockport, Louisiana
- Launched: March 30, 2017
- Acquired: May 23, 2019
- Commissioned: September 26, 2019
- Home port: Honolulu, Hawaii
- Identification: MMSI number: 338926434; Callsign: NWMH; Hull number: WPC-1134
- Status: in active service
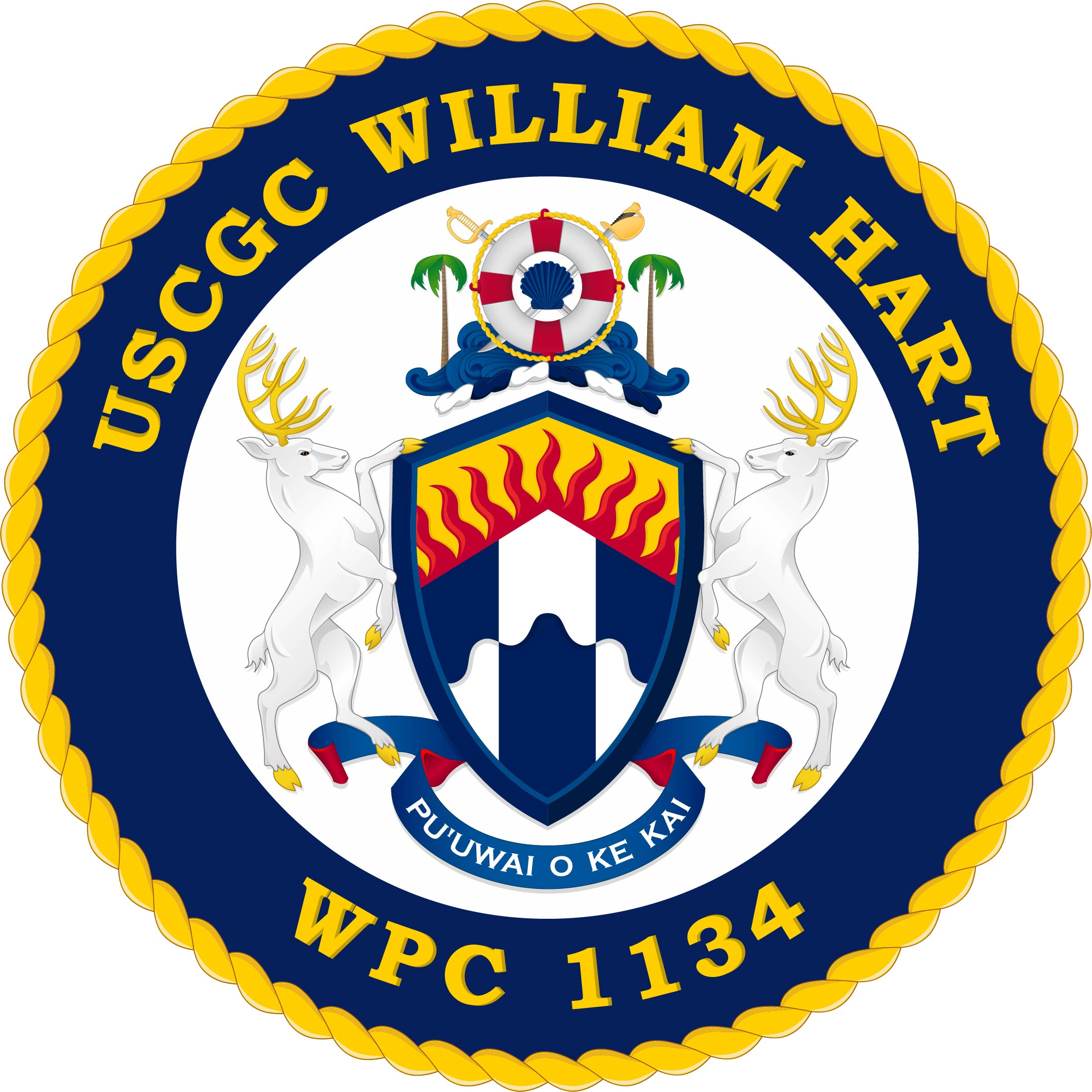
- Badge

General characteristics
- Class & type: Sentinel-class cutter
- Displacement: 353 long tons (359 t)
- Length: 46.8 m (154 ft)
- Beam: 7.6 m (25 ft)
- Depth: 2.9 m (9.5 ft)
- Propulsion: 2 × 4,300 kW (5,800 shp); 1 × 75 kW (101 shp) bow thruster
- Speed: 28 knots (52 km/h; 32 mph)
- Range: 2,500 nautical miles (4,600 km; 2,900 mi)
- Endurance: 5 days
- Boats & landing craft carried: 1 × Short Range Prosecutor RHIB
- Complement: 4 officers, 20 crew
- Sensors & processing systems: L-3 C4ISR suite
- Armament: 1 × Mk 38 Mod 2 25 mm automatic gun; 4 × crew-served Browning M2 machine guns

USCGC William Hart (WPC-1134) is the 34th Sentinel-class cutter built for the United States Coast Guard. She is the third of three Fast Response Cutters homeported in Honolulu, Hawaii.

== Operational history ==
William Hart was commissioned on September 26, 2019, by Rear Adm. Kevin Lunday after arriving in Honolulu after a 140-day pre-commissioning deployment from Key West, Florida. A celebration was held on September 26, 2019, to celebrate the commissioning.

In 2020, she participated in Operation Kuru Kuru for 36 days to deter Illegal, unreported and unregulated fishing (IUU) around American Samoa. This would be the first unsupported FRC patrol in Exclusive Economic Zones (EEZs), with her patrolling four EEZs in Oceania.

In June 2021, she completed her first Command Assessment of Readiness for Training and Tailored Ship's Training Availability with a 96% score.

In September 2021, she took part in the rescue of a 67-year-old man from the S/V Epic after it was lost at sea for nine days.

Between October and November 2021, she completed a second unsupported IUU patrol in Oceania for another 36 days.

Between January and February 2023, she partook in Operation Aiga, which was another 42-day IUU patrol.

== Namesake ==
She is named for William C. Hart, a sailor of the Coast Guard who earned the Gold Lifesaving Medal when he jumped off CG-213, which he was commanding, to save a member from the Thomas Tracy who had fallen overboard during a storm.
