= James Movick =

- Occupation: civil servant
- Known for: served as the Director General of the Pacific Islands Forum Fisheries Agency from 2012 to 2018

James Movick is a civil servant from the Federated States of Micronesia who served as the Director General of the Pacific Islands Forum Fisheries Agency from 2012 to 2018.

In 2016 the United States informed the Forum Fisheries Agency that it would not pay the $17 million share of the Agency's expenses. In return the Agency declined to issue any fishing licenses to American fishing vessels.
