= Operation Kurukuru =

Annual Pacific Island maritime surveillance operation

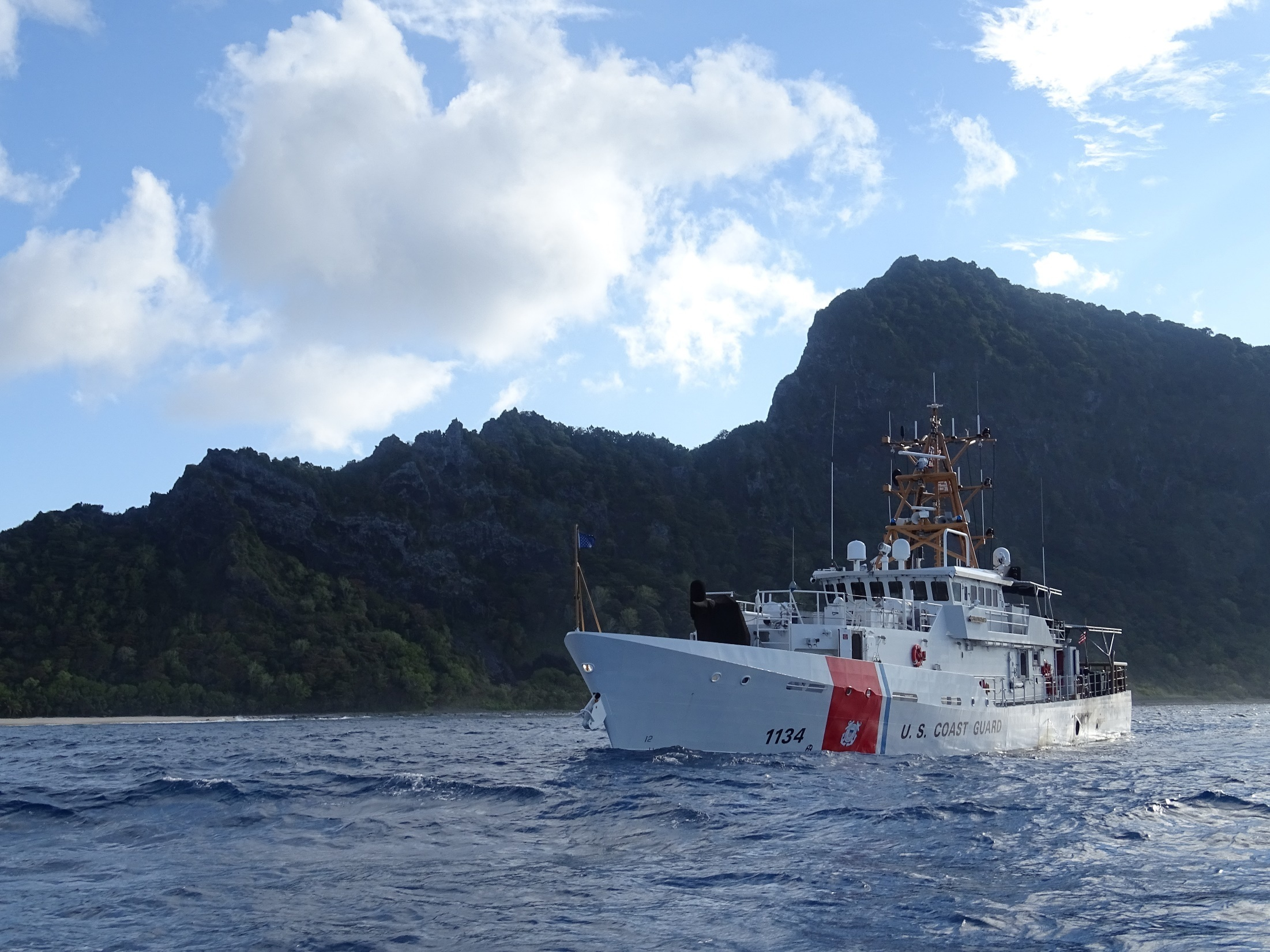
USCGC William Hart patrols American Samoa during Operation Kurukuru 2021

Operation Kurukuru is an annual maritime surveillance operation conducted by Pacific Island countries to combat illegal, unreported and unregulated fishing. It attempts to combat this within the exclusive economic zone of members of the Pacific Islands Forum, and is run by the Forum Fisheries Agency (FFA) within the Pacific Islands Forum. It is also often done in cooperation with the Pacific Quadrilateral Defence Coordination Group, and usually takes place over two weeks. Initiated in 2005, the operation is one of the longest-running and most coordinated regional maritime security efforts in the Pacific. It is one of four such annual regional operations to combat illegal, unreported and unregulated fishing. It reflects a cooperative security arrangement among small island states with limited maritime enforcement capacities.

== Background ==
The Pacific Ocean is home to some of the world’s richest tuna fisheries, and its vast maritime space poses significant challenges for surveillance and enforcement. The region's reliance on fisheries for economic development and food security makes it particularly vulnerable to illegal, unreported and unregulated fishing. In response, the FFA developed Operation Kurukuru as part of a broader strategy to support its member states in maintaining control over their maritime resources.

== Coordination and hosting ==
Operation Kurukuru was originally hosted on a rotating basis by participating FFA member states. However, since its establishment, the Regional Fisheries Surveillance Centre (RFSC) in Honiara, Solomon Islands, has become the central coordination hub for the operation. From the RFSC, FFA officials work alongside regional partners to facilitate planning, intelligence sharing, real-time vessel tracking, and the deployment of surveillance assets across the Pacific.

== Objectives ==
The primary aim of Operation Kurukuru is to detect and deter illegal, unreported and unregulated fishing activities, enhance maritime security and promote sustainable fisheries in the region's exclusive economic zones. The operation also enhances Maritime Domain Awareness (MDA), information sharing and coordination between Pacific nations and capacity building for maritime enforcement agencies. It is also a way for the FFA to test out new technologies, and train other members and partners.

== Operational structure ==
The operation typically involves patrol vessels from member states and aerial surveillance aircraft, supplied by Australia, New Zealand, France and the US. It also includes satellite based monitoring systems, and information sharing and coordination from the RFSC. Participating nations operate jointly to inspect and board fishing vessels that are suspected of operating illegally. Detected infringements are reported to local authorities for legal action, and often fined for their infringements.

== International support ==
Operation Kurukuru receives substantial support from external partners. Australia and, to some extent, New Zealand provide much of the operational funding. France and the United States frequently provide patrol vessels, maritime patrol aircraft, and logistical support. This highlights the geopolitical significance of Pacific fisheries and the strategic interests of partner countries in ensuring maritime stability in the region.

== Yearly operations ==
=== Operation Kurukuru 2005 ===
Hosted in Fiji, and involved Tonga, Vanuatu, Tuvalu and France, and took place between 27 May and 9 June 2005. It did not detect any activities that warranted enforcement against any vessels, but was seen as a success due to increased cooperation between the countries.

=== Operation Kurukuru 2006 ===
It was hosted in Tonga, and involved Fiji, Samoa, Solomon Islands, Tuvalu, Australia and New Zealand. 287 vessels were examined, and 5 vessels were determined to be conducting potentially illegal activities.

=== Operation Kurukuru 2007 ===
It was hosted in Tonga, and involved American Samoa, Cook Islands, Samoa, Kiribati, Solomon Islands, Tuvalu, Vanuatu, New Zealand and Australia as well as naval forces from the United States and France. It took place between 20 August to 3 September 2007. In total, 166 vessels were examined, 24 vessels were assessed as potentially conducting illegal activities, and by the end of the operation, 3 vessels were escorted to port for further investigation.

=== Operation Kurukuru 2008 ===
It was hosted by Solomon Islands, and was joined by the Cook Islands, Samoa, Tonga, Tuvalu, Vanuatu, Australia, New Zealand, the United States and France. 300 fishing vessels were inspected, and 20 of them were considered worthy of further investigation.

=== Operation Kurukuru 2009 ===
First year it was hosted at the RFSC in Honiara, and involved Cook Islands, Kiribati, Solomon Islands, Tokelau, Tuvalu, Tonga, Samoa, Vanuatu, Australia, New Zealand, the United States and France. 191 vessels were investigated, 21 vessels were boarded, and 3 were escorted to port for further investigation. 5 fishing vessels received fines for various breaches of the law.

=== Operation Kurukuru 2010 ===
It was hosted at the RFSC, and involved Australia, Cook Islands, Fiji, Kiribati, New Zealand, Samoa, Solomon Islands, Tokelau, Tonga, Vanuatu, France and the United States. 198 vessels were investigated, 35 were boarded, and 2 vessels were apprehended and fined.

=== Operation Kurukuru 2011 ===
It was hosted at the RFSC, and involved the Cook Islands, Micronesia, Fiji, Kiribati, Marshall Islands, Nauru, Niue, Palau, Papua New Guinea, Samoa, Solomon Islands, Tokelau, Tonga, Tuvalu, Vanuatu, New Zealand, Australia, France and the US. 400 vessels were investigated, 80 were boarded, 8 vessels were apprehended. It was the first year all members of the Pacific Islands Forum participated.

=== Operation Kurukuru 2012 ===
It was hosted at the RFSC, and involved the Cook Islands, Micronesia, Kiribati, Marshall Islands, Nauru, Niue, Palau, Samoa, Solomon Islands, Tokelau, Tonga, Tuvalu, Vanuatu, New Zealand, Australia, France and the US. 323 vessels were sighted, 206 were boarded, and 27 were discovered with infringements.

=== Operation Kurukuru 2013 ===
It was hosted at the RFSC, and involved 15 Pacific countries, including France, the United States, Australia and New Zealand. More than 100 fishing vessels were boarded.

=== Operation Kurukuru 2014 ===
It was hosted at the RFSC, and involved all FFA member countries, as well as support from the Pacific Quadrilateral Defence Coordination Group. 1011 vessels were sighted, 114 fishing vessels were boarded, and inspected, and 12 were put under further investigation.

=== Operation Kurukuru 2015 ===
It was hosted at the RFSC, and involved all FFA member countries, as well as France and the United States, and it involved 112 boardings, both at sea and in port. It was the first year that satellite imagery was used to identify targets that did not report their position to the authorities, which resulted in the identification of two such vessels.

=== Operation Kurukuru 2016 ===
It was hosted at the RFSC, and involved all FFA member countries, as well as France and the United States.

=== Operation Kurukuru 2017 ===
It was hosted at the RFSC, and involved all FFA member countries, as well as France and the United States. 480 vessels were detected, 111 vessels were boarded and inspected, with at least one vessel being found to breach licence conditions.

Semi Koroilvesau, the Minister for Fisheries for Fiji, addressed recruits at Fiji's military's training centre at Vatuwaqa on 19 June 2017, reminding them of the importance in enforcing Fiji's Exclusive Economic Zone, and the importance of its participation in the annual Operation Kurukuru exercises.

=== Operation Kurukuru 2018 ===
It was hosted at the RFSC, and involved all FFA member countries, as well as the Pacific Quadrilateral Defence Coordination Group. 181 vessels were sighted, 116 vessels were boarded, but no fishing vessels were found to be in violation.

=== Operation Kurukuru 2019 ===
It was hosted at the RFSC, and involved all FFA member countries, as well as the United States and France. It resulted in the boarding of 131 vessels, with 4 ships found to be in violation.

=== Operation Kurukuru 2020 ===
It was hosted at the RFSC, and involved all FFA members, and the Pacific Quadrilateral Defence Coordination Group. It is unclear how many vessels were investigated, but reports say that it was a success, and that several vessels were found to conduct suspicious activities. This is unclear due to the COVID-19 pandemic.

=== Operation Kurukuru 2021 ===
It was hosted at the RFSC, but had much support remotely due to the COVID-19 pandemic, and involved all FFA members, and the Pacific Quadrilateral Defence Coordination Group. Over 300 vessels were remotely sensed by satellites, and 78 vessels were boarded. A number of vessels were put under investigation following the operation. This year utilized more virtual platforms and other technologies, due to the COVID-19 pandemic.

=== Operation Kurukuru 2022 ===
It was hosted at the RFSC, and involved all FFA members, and the Pacific Quadrilateral Defence Coordination Group. It marked a return to full strength after the COVID-19 pandemic. It is unclear how many vessels were inspected, but combined with other operations, 35 vessels were reported as having a high risk or perpetrating illegal, unreported and unregulated fishing.

=== Operation Kurukuru 2023 ===
It was hosted at the RFSC, and involved all FFA members, along with the Pacific Quadrilateral Defence Coordination Group. With increased use of satellite technologies, it detected 19,659, inspected 129 vessels, but found none that were of further interest.

=== Operation Kurukuru 2024 ===
It was hosted at the RFSC, and involved all FFA members, along with the Pacific Quadrilateral Defence Coordination Group. 196 vessels were contacted, and 89 were boarded. 8 vessels of interest were detected and reported to members for further investigation.
