= Pacific Islands Forum Fisheries Agency =

International organization in Oceania

- Abbreviation: FFA
- Formation: 9 August 1979 (47 years ago)
- Type: International organization
- Headquarters: Honiara, Solomon Islands
- Coordinates: 9°26′21″S 159°58′13″E
- Region served: Pacific Ocean
- Members: 17 state members
- Director General: Noan David Pakop
- Website: www.ffa.int

The Pacific Islands Forum Fisheries Agency (FFA) is an intergovernmental agency established in 1979 to facilitate regional co-operation and co-ordination on fisheries policies between its member states in order to achieve conservation and optimum utilisation of living marine resources, in particular highly migratory fish stocks, for the benefit of the peoples of the region, in particular the developing countries. The FFA Secretariat is located in Honiara, Solomon Islands. FFA is governed by its 17 members through the Forum Fisheries Committee (FFC) and is part of the Pacific regional institutional architecture through the Council of Regional Organisations in the Pacific (CROP). The agency operates the Regional Fisheries Surveillance Centre, headquartered in the Solomon Islands. It annually runs an Operation Kurukuru—a joint effort to board and inspect suspicious fishing vessels.

== History and status ==
Following a declaration by the eighth South Pacific Forum in 1977, the FFA was established in 1979 by an international treaty titled: South Pacific Forum Fisheries Agency Convention, signed by 14 states, mostly small island states in the Pacific Ocean plus Australia and New Zealand. Tokelau additionally joined the FFA membership in 2002.

== Members ==
The following territory and states are the 17 members of FFA:

- Australia
- Cook Islands
- Fiji
- Kiribati
- Marshall Islands
- Federated States of Micronesia
- Nauru
- New Zealand
- Niue
- Palau
- Papua New Guinea
- Samoa
- Solomon Islands
- Tokelau
- Tonga
- Tuvalu
- Vanuatu

== FFA Director-General ==
The FFA Director-General is the head of the FFA Secretariat. The current FFA Director-General is Noan David Pakop (Papua New Guinea), appointed by the Forum Fisheries Committee in 2024. Previous FFA Directors (the title was changed to Director-General in 2005) were:

- Dr. Manumatavai Tupou-Roosen (Tonga) (2018–2024)
- James Movick (Federated States of Micronesia) (2012–2018)
- Su'a Tanielu (Samoa) (2006–2012)
- Feleti Teo (Tuvalu) (2000–2006)
- Talobak Victorio Uherbelau (Palau) (1994–2000)
- Peter Kenilorea (Solomon Islands) (1991–1994)
- Philipp Muller (Samoa) (1981–1991)
- Dick James (UK) (interim director, 1980–1981)
- Wilfred (Bill) Razzell (Canada) (1979–1980)

The FFA Director-General is supported by the Deputy Director-General. As of February 2026, the position is vacant. Allan Rahari (Solomon Islands) currently serves as interim Deputy Director-General. Previous deputies include:

- Dr. Pio Manoa (Fiji) (2023–2026)
- Matthew Hooper (New Zealand) (2018–2022)
- Perry Head (Australia) (interim, Feb–Jun 2018)
- Wez Norris (Australia) (2012–2018)
- James Movick (Federated States of Micronesia) (2010–2012)
- Dr. Transform Aqorau (Solomon Islands) (2006–2010)
- Steve Dunn (Australia) (2004–2006)
- Bruce Chapman (Australia) (interim, 2003–2004)
- Barry Pollock (Australia) (2000–2003)
- Ian Cartwright (UK/Australia) (1996–2000)
- Camillus Narakobi (Papua New Guinea) (interim, 1995–1996)
- Drew Wright (Australia) (1991–1995)
- David Doulman (Australia) (1988–1991)
- Les Clark (New Zealand) (1984–1987)
- George Coulter (UK) (1982–1984)

== Governance ==
FFA is governed by the Forum Fisheries Committee (FFC). The FFC provides policy direction and oversight for the Agency and serves as the primary decision-making body on regional fisheries management cooperation among FFA members.

The FFC operates through two components: the FFC Officials and the FFC Ministerial.

The FFC Officials is made up of senior government fisheries officials from FFA's 17 members and focuses on technical, financial, and operational matters, including review of the Agency’s annual work programme and budget. The FFC Ministerial consists of government ministers responsible for fisheries from FFA's 17 members. The ministerial provides a higher-level strategic direction and policy oversight.

Both components typically meet annually, with meetings hosted on a rotational basis by FFA members. Decisions endorsed through the FFC guide the work of the FFA Secretariat.

The Forum Fisheries Committee is also responsible for the appointment of the FFA Director-General.

== Activities ==
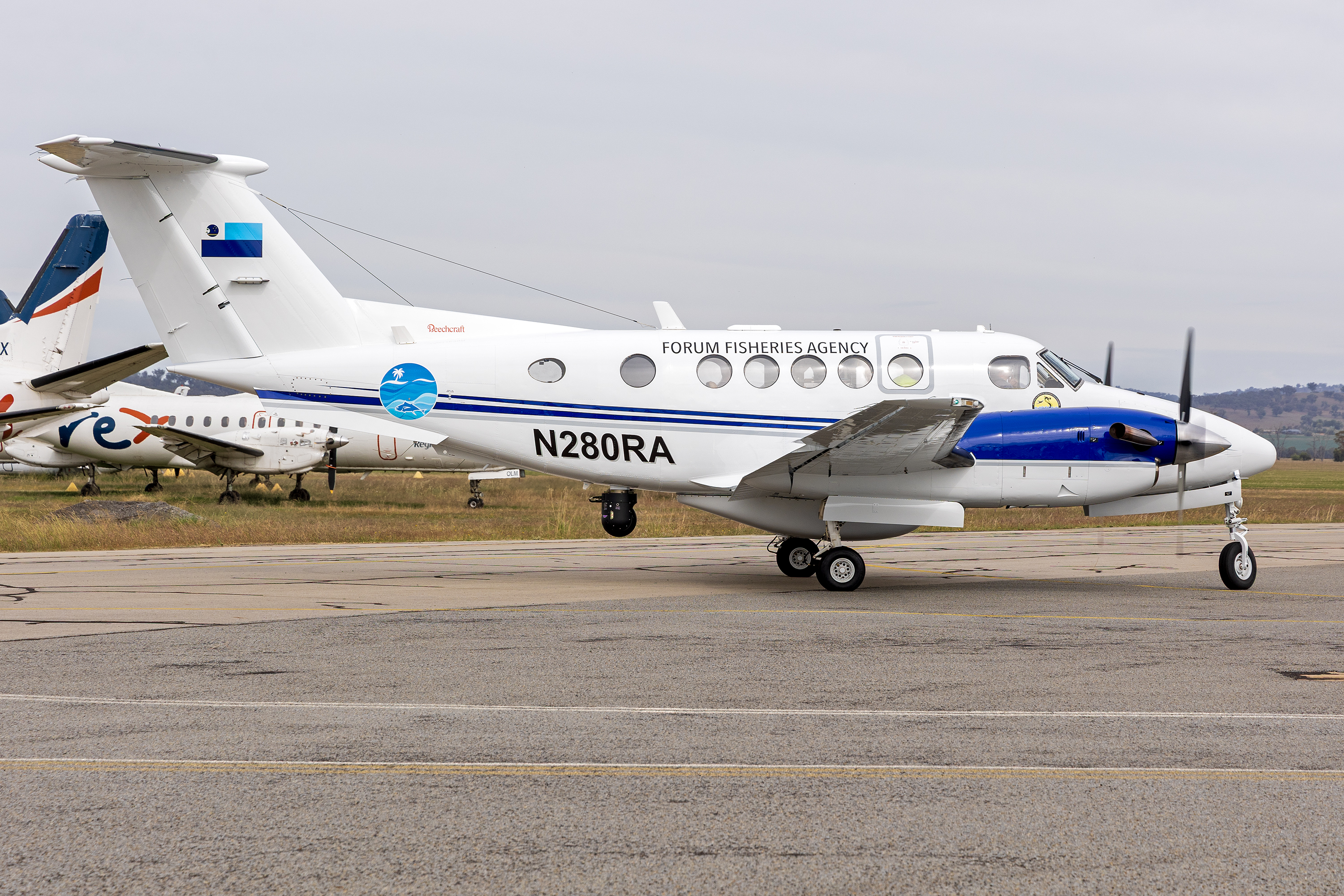
Forum Fisheries Agency aerial surveillance aircraft

FFA assists its member governments and administrations in applying a coordinated and mutually beneficial approach to the conservation, management and development of regional tuna stocks. FFA has assisted its members in developing or negotiating a number of regional or sub-regional instruments for this purpose. These include:

- The Nauru Agreement (PNA): a subregional agreement that promotes collaborative zone-based management of tropical tuna purse-seine fisheries in the Exclusive Economic Zones of its parties, including through instruments such as the Palau Arrangement Vessel Days Management Schemes that limit total tuna fishing effort within the combined PNA EEZs, the Federated States of Micronesia Arrangement that provides for preferential access by Party vessels to the EEZs of other Parties, and three Nauru Agreement Implementing Arrangements that provide for such matters as shared conditions for licensing tuna vessels, including a requirement not to fish in the two completely enclosed high seas pockets of the tropical Western Pacific, a requirement for 100% independent observer coverage aboard purse-seiners, and a requirement not to fish on or interact with FADs during the months of July, August and September. FFA is no longer the secretariat for the Nauru Agreement, which graduated to independent operation in 2010 with its own office based in the Marshall Islands.
- The Tokelau Arrangement (TKA): a new subregional arrangement that came into effect in December 2014 and which promotes collaborative zone-based management of South Pacific sub-tropical albacore tuna fisheries (mainly longline fisheries) in the Exclusive Economic Zones of its participants. The participants have expressed the intention to develop and agree a binding Catch Management Scheme under this arrangement, and by their sixth meeting in October 2017 had agreed almost all of the text of a scheme, with the catch allocation mechanism for participating EEZs yet to be finalised.
- The Convention for the Conservation and Management of Highly Migratory Fish Stocks in the Western and Central Pacific Ocean (WCPFC): FFA members were instrumental in the agreement of this tuna RFMO Convention, which came into effect in 2004, and the joint FFA membership continues to be the most active proposer of new conservation and management measures under the convention. FFA members form one of the two permanent chambers in the WCPFC decision-making process. Assisting its SIDS members to nationally implement the measures they agree at WCPFC continues to be a major component of the work-program of the FFA Secretariat.
- The Niue Treaty: The Niue Treaty on Cooperation in Fisheries Surveillance and Law Enforcement in the South Pacific Region is administered by FFA, and the Niue Treaty Multilateral Subsidiary Arrangement (NTSA) came into force in 2015. The Niue Treaty provides for cooperation in sharing fisheries surveillance and law enforcement assets, and for sharing information – including VMS information – as appropriate. Parties can agree to allow other parties' patrol vessels to pursue suspected illegal fishers into their waters, and otherwise mutually cooperate to ensure that IUU fishers cannot easily escape national jurisdiction.
- The Treaty on Fisheries between the Governments of Certain Pacific Island States and the Government of the United States of America: Known in Pacific Islands fisheries circles as the "US Treaty" this has provided for multilateral access by USA-flagged tuna purse-seine fishing vessels to Pacific Island Parties' waters (the collective EEZs of FFA membership with the exception of closed areas that are agreed from time to time). The US Treaty was agreed in 1987 and has moved through several phases. From 2013 to 2016 it operated under an annual statement of intent pending agreement on renewal of the Treaty, which was however achieved in 2017 after considerable discussion.
- The Harmonized Minimum Terms and Conditions for Access by Foreign Fishing vessels (MTCs): are regionally-agreed guidelines for the development of national and subregional tuna fishing licensing conditions that are updated from time to time as a result of technical advice from the FFA MCS Working Group to the Forum Fisheries Committee (the FFA Governing Council of member governments and administrations), and used as a template for updating national policy and law as appropriate.
- Operation Kurukuru: run annually since 2005 to combat illegal, unreported and unregulated fishing and safeguard members' maritime resources, coordinated by the Regional Fisheries Surveillance Centre.

As well as its policy coordination functions in tuna fisheries management and MCS (Monitoring, Control and Surveillance), the FFA Secretariat also has a substantial role in assisting its member countries in tuna fisheries development, including economic analysis, appraisal and promotion of investment opportunities, and in upgrading national standards that maintain access to major foreign markets. This latter work includes the establishment or updating of National Plans of Action to implement FAO standards, and the development of regionally-harmonised Catch Documentation Schemes and Port-based MCS measures for fish originating from Pacific Island SIDS waters.

== See also ==
- South Pacific Tuna Treaty
- Pacific Islands Forum
- Pacific Community
- Secretariat of the Pacific Regional Environment Programme
- University of South Pacific
