= Rollin Arnold Fritch =

United States Coast Guardsman

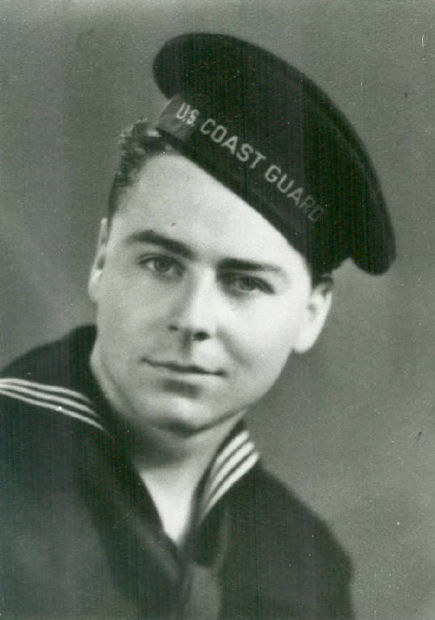
Rollin A. Fritch

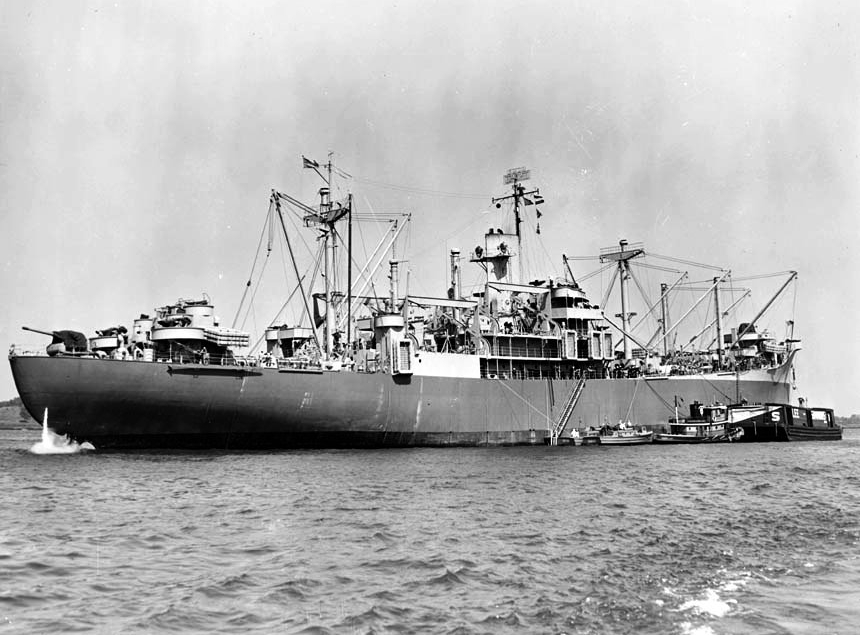
Troop transport USS Callaway, Fritch's ship.

Rollin Arnold Fritch (May 9, 1920 – January 8, 1945) was a United States Coast Guard seaman. He died at his weapons station while shooting at a Japanese kamikaze, during World War II.

Rollin was the youngest of seven children, born to farmers, who grew up near Pawnee City, Nebraska. He worked in a meat packing plant before he enlisted in the Coast Guard in 1942.

In January 1945, he was part of a weapons crew assigned to the USS Callaway, a troop transport operated by the United States Navy.

Fritch was seen firing at the kamikaze until it struck his ship, killing him and 28 crew-mates, off Luzon, on January 8, 1945.

In 1945, Fritch was awarded a posthumous Silver Star. According to the Coast Guard:

He unhesitatingly relinquished all chance of escape as the plane plunged toward the target and remained steadfastly at his gun. He continued to direct his fire with unrelenting fury upon the enemy until carried away with his weapon by the terrific impact.

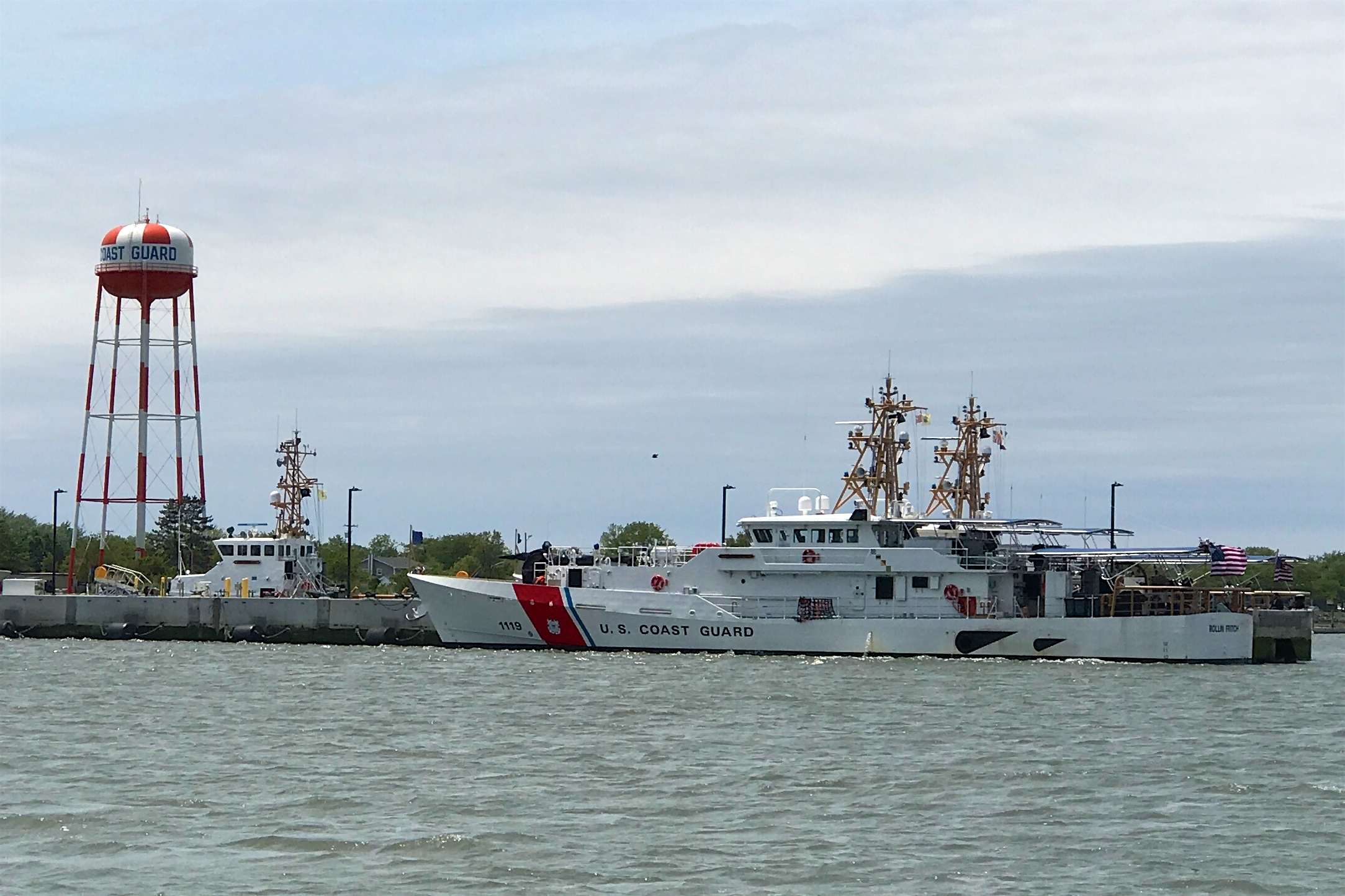
Rollin A. Fritch at Cape May homeport

In 2010, Charles "Skip" W. Bowen, who was then the Coast Guard's most senior non-commissioned officer, proposed that all 58 cutters in the Sentinel class should be named after enlisted Coast Guardsmen, or one of the Coast Guard's precursor services, who were recognized for their heroism. In 2014 the Coast Guard announced that Rollin A. Fritch would be the namesake of the 19th cutter, USCGC Rollin A. Fritch. She was built in Lockport, Louisiana, at the Bollinger shipyards, and delivered to the Coast Guard in August 2016. After completing three months of sea trials, the cutter will be commissioned in November 2016. Her homeport is near the Coast Guard's Cape May Training Center.

In January 2015, seventy years after his death, the Lincoln Journal Star interviewed his niece, Donna Fuller, who said the Coast Guard officer who contacted her to invite her to the ship's commissioning said he had spent eight months searching for Fritch's surviving relatives. She remembered her uncle as being very kind. The Coast Guard flew Fuller and her brother to Lockport to see the ship to be named after her uncle during its construction.
