= Vint Hill Farms Station =

Unincorporated community in Virginia, United States

- Fauquier County, Virginia

Site information
- Type: Signals intelligence and electronic warfare facility

Location
- Coordinates: 38.748°N 77.672°W

Site history
- Built: 1942
- Built by: United States Army
- In use: 1942–1997
- Demolished: 1999

Vint Hill Farms Station (VHFS) was a United States Army and National Security Agency (NSA) signals intelligence and electronic warfare facility located in Fauquier County, Virginia, United States, near Warrenton. VHFS was closed in 1997 and the land was sold off in 1999. Today the site hosts various engineering and technology companies, as well as two Federal Aviation Administration (FAA) air traffic control facilities, and the Cold War Museum.

== History ==
Vint Hill Farms Station was established during World War II in 1942 by the Army's Signal Intelligence Service (SIS). The 701-acre (284 ha) facility was built because the Army needed a secure location near SIS headquarters in Arlington Hall to serve as a cryptography school and as a refitting station for signal units returning from combat prior to redeployment overseas. The unit on station had a World War II Monitoring Station Designator of MS-1. VHFS was one of the United States' most important intelligence gathering stations during the war, playing a pivotal role in eavesdropping on enemy communications. In 1943, the VHFS intercepted a message from the Japanese ambassador in Berlin to his superiors in Tokyo. It also provided a detailed description of Nazi fortifications along the French Coast, and General Dwight D. Eisenhower later said the information made a significant contribution to the D-Day invasion at Normandy.

After the war, VHFS became the first field station of the Army Security Agency, a subordinate to the NSA, and the facility conducted signals intelligence operations and served as a training center for radio-intercept operators, cryptanalysts, and radio-repair technicians. During the Cold War, VHFS intercepted key Soviet diplomatic and military communications sent over FISH teleprinters. The Army Electronic Material Readiness Activity moved to VHFS in 1961 and managed signals intelligence and electronic warfare equipment and systems maintenance for the Army Security Agency and other signals intelligence and electronic warfare units worldwide.

In 1973, the VHFS's mission changed to research, development and support of intelligence and electronic warfare for the Army, Department of Defense and foreign allies of the United States. In addition, the U.S. Environmental Protection Agency took over operation of the facility's photographic interpretation center from the Defense Intelligence Agency and the center was renamed the Environmental Photographic Interpretation Center. In the late 1970s, VHFS was put on the military base closure list, and all maintenance and construction at the facility was halted. In 1981, the facility was removed from the closure list and funding for maintenance and construction was restored.

A VHFS employee told a House of Representatives subcommittee in 1977 that the facility had a bank of machines designed to intercept foreign communications, including those of U.S. allies, such as communications between United Kingdom's Washington embassy and London. The Associated Press reported in 1989 that VHFS served as a "giant ear" operated by the NSA, with its likely target being foreign embassies in Washington, D.C., as well as international communications coming into the United States.

In 1987, control of the facility was transferred from the Army Intelligence and Security Command (the successor to the Army Security Agency) to the Communications-Electronics Command, which was based, at the time, in Fort Monmouth, New Jersey. The base took on a support role, developing and testing signal equipment and supporting the operations of agencies such as the Central Intelligence Agency and the Federal Bureau of Investigation.

The 1993 Base Realignment and Closure Commission recommended the closure of VHFS, which would produce savings of $10.5 million annually. At the time there were 846 military personnel, 1,356 civilian personnel and 454 contractors based at the facility. Most of the personnel were reassigned to Fort Monmouth, while others went to Fort Belvoir, Virginia. The intelligence equipment maintenance and repair personnel were relocated to Tobyhanna Army Depot, Pennsylvania.

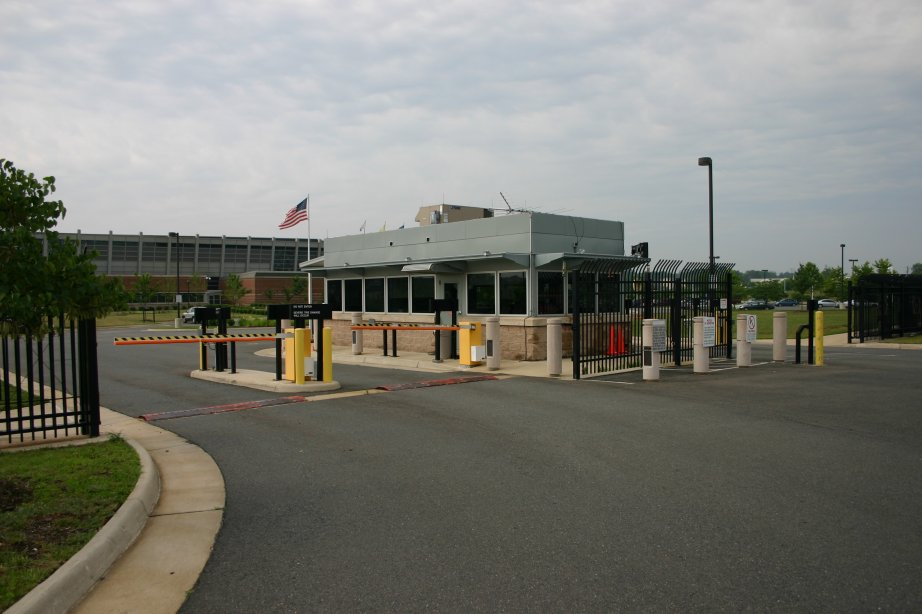
Entrance to the FAA Potomac Consolidated TRACON facility

VHFS was closed on September 30, 1997. The Army and the Virginia State Vint Hill Farms Economic Development Authority settled on a purchased price of $925,000 for VHFS, and the transfer of the property was completed in 1999. Today the site hosts various engineering and technology companies, Potomac Consolidated TRACON facility and, since 2011, the FAA's Air Traffic Control System Command Center.

The Cold War Museum opened on the property in November 2011. At present, it is open on weekends (and at other times by appointment), but it takes advantage of the historical aspects of the property. It occupies a two-story building used for supply purposes when the base was open.

There are also a dance school (Lyrique Dance), gymnastics school (Bull Run Academy of Gymnastics)and axe-throwing pub (HEROIC AXE) on the property on Kennedy Road.

The streets in the residential development which now occupies much of VHFS are named after people important in the history of computers. (For details, click on the coordinates in the infobox above.)

== Demographics ==
Historical population
Year	Pop.
1970	1,018
1980	1,130
1990	1,332

Vint Hill Farms Station was defined as a census-designated place (CDP) at the 1970, 1980, and 1990 United States Censuses. Its population ranged from 1,018 in 1970 to 1,332 in 1990, before the facility was closed in the 1997. The area is now part of the New Baltimore CDP. The current VHFS site population is approximately 300.

== See also ==
- Arlington Hall
- Warrenton Training Center
- Fort Monmouth
- Aberdeen Proving Ground
