= USCGC Lawrence Lawson =

2016 Sentinel-class cutter

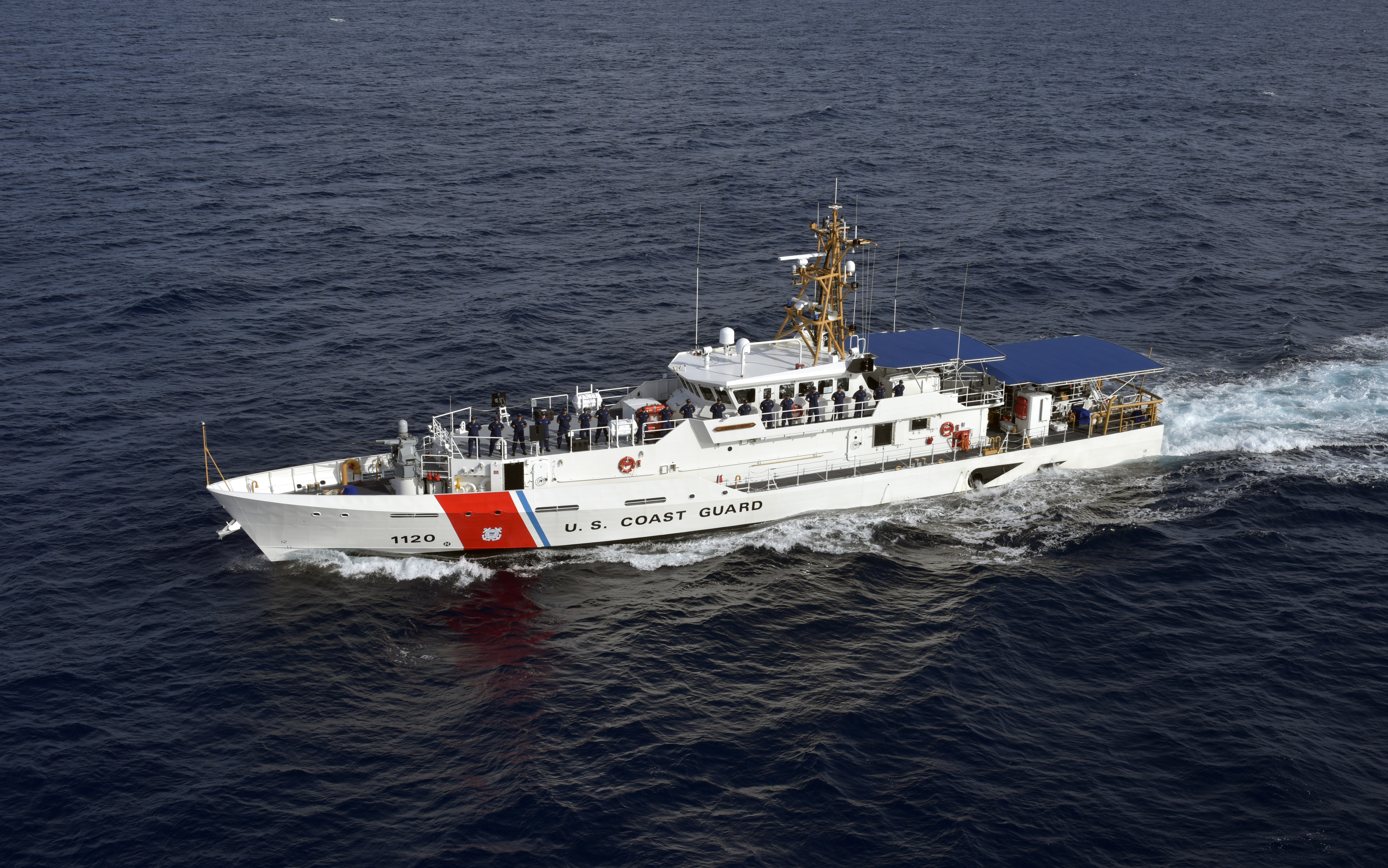
- The crew of Lawrence Lawson mans the rail during sea trials off the coast of Miami

History

United States
- Name: Lawrence Lawson
- Namesake: Lawrence O. Lawson
- Operator: United States Coast Guard
- Builder: Bollinger Shipyards, Lockport, Louisiana
- Launched: October 20, 2016
- Acquired: October 20, 2016
- Commissioned: March 18, 2017
- Home port: Cape May, New Jersey
- Identification: MMSI number: 338926420; Callsign: NDOH; Hull number: WPC-1120
- Motto: Born on tragedy, bred in heroism
- Status: in active service
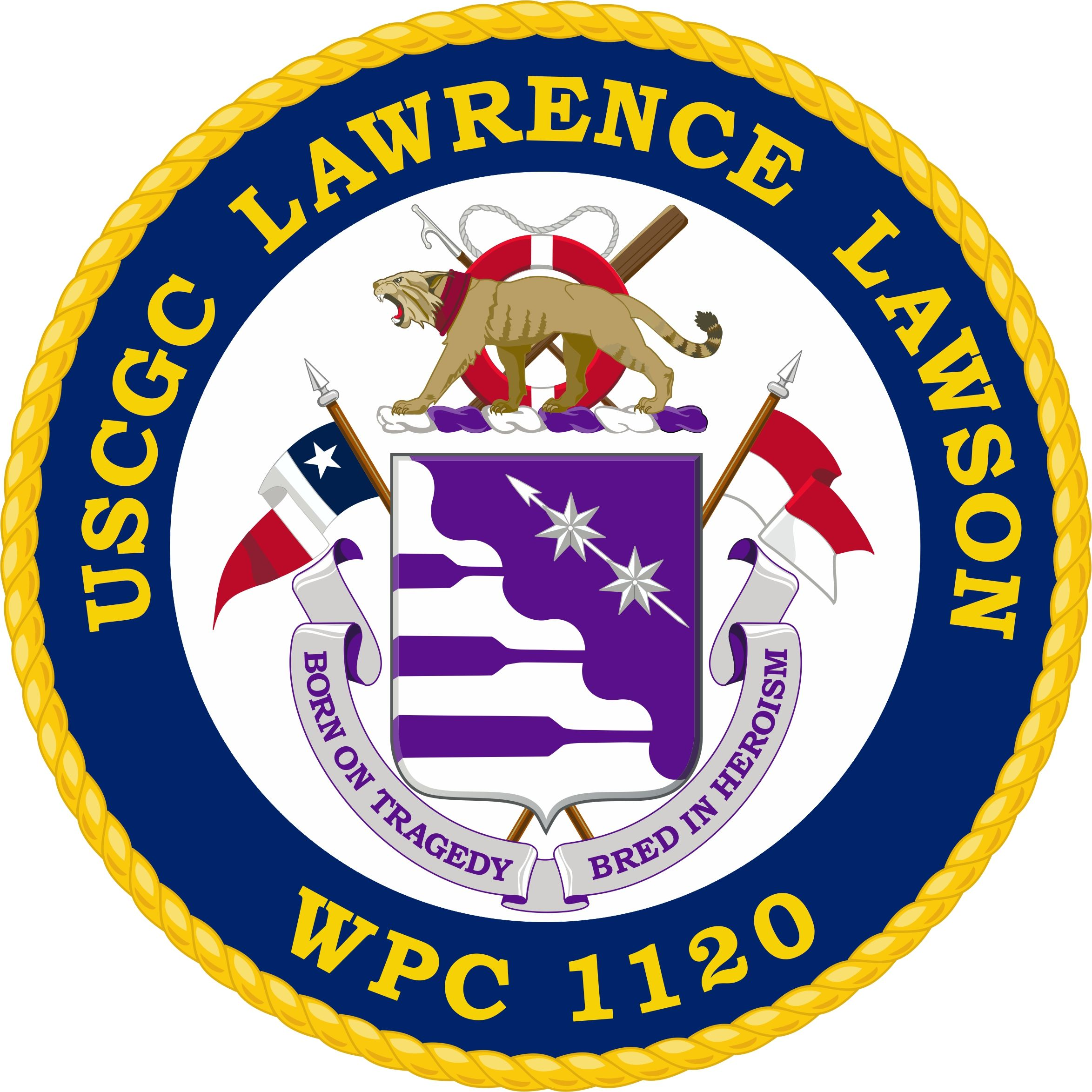
- Badge

General characteristics
- Class & type: Sentinel-class cutter
- Displacement: 353 long tons (359 t)
- Length: 46.8 m (154 ft)
- Beam: 8.11 m (26.6 ft)
- Depth: 2.9 m (9.5 ft)
- Propulsion: 2 × 4,300 kW (5,800 shp); 1 × 75 kW (101 shp) bow thruster
- Speed: 28 knots (52 km/h; 32 mph)
- Endurance: 5 days, 2,500 nautical miles (4,600 km; 2,900 mi); Designed to be on patrol 2,500 hours per year
- Boats & landing craft carried: 1 × Short Range Prosecutor RHIB
- Complement: 2 officers, 20 crew
- Sensors & processing systems: L-3 C4ISR suite
- Armament: 1 × Mk 38 Mod 2 25 mm automatic gun; 4 × crew-served Browning M2 machine guns

USCGC Lawrence Lawson is the 20th Sentinel-class cutter to be delivered to the United States Coast Guard. She was built at Bollinger Shipyards, in Lockport, Louisiana, and delivered to the Coast Guard, for her sea trials, on October 20, 2016. She was commissioned on March 18, 2017. She is the second cutter of her class to be the homeported at the Coast Guard Training Center in Cape May, New Jersey, and also the second to be stationed outside of the Caribbean.

Like her sister ships, Lawrence Lawson is primarily devoted to search and rescue, and interception of drug and people smugglers. The vessels are capable of a full speed of at least 28 knots (32 mph), and have a range of 2,950 nautical miles (5,460 km). The vessels are designed to support a crew of approximately two dozen, for missions of up to five days. The Sentinel-class cutters will replace the slightly smaller Island-class cutters.

== Homeported in Cape May ==
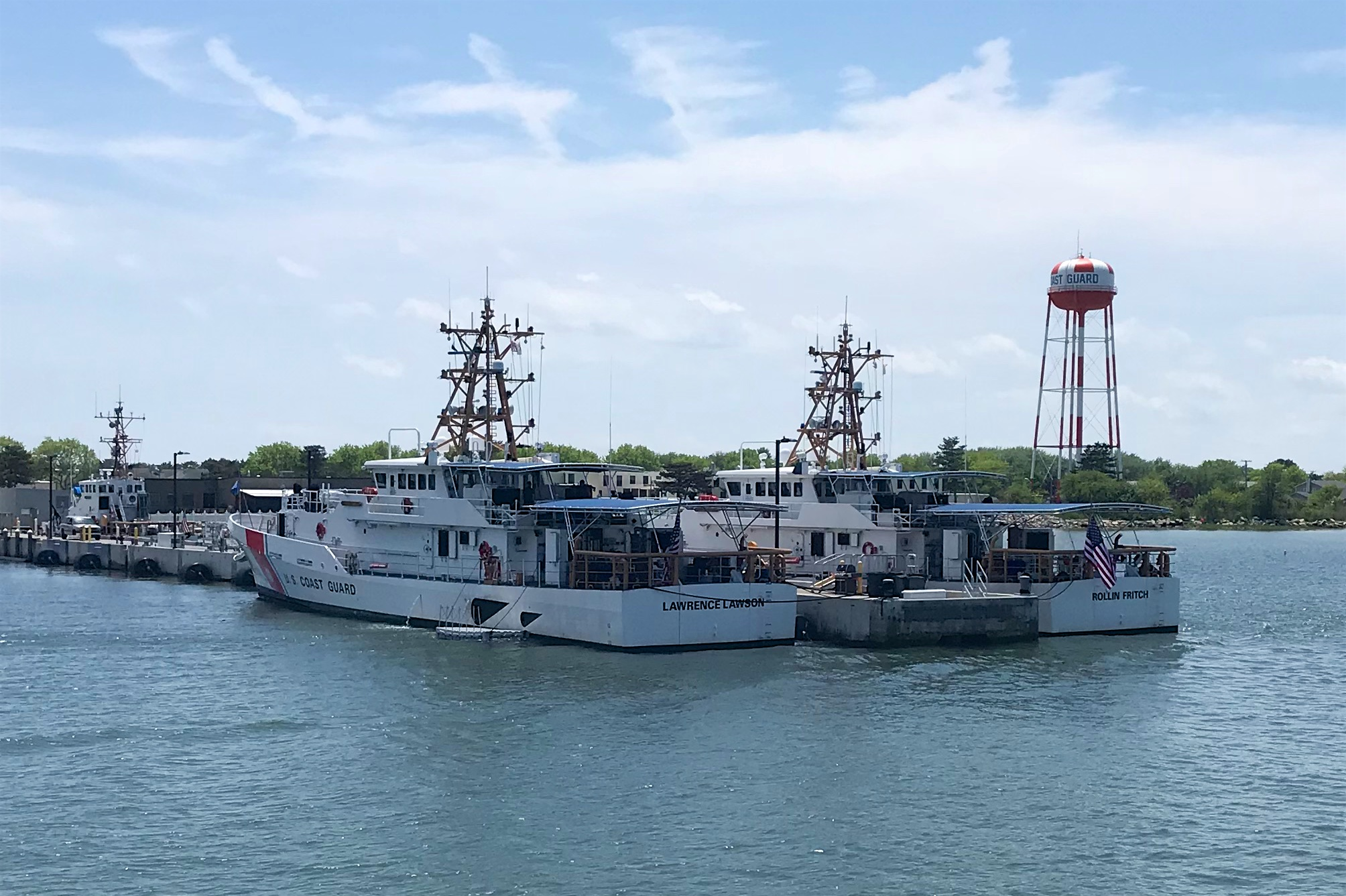
Lawrence Lawson and Rollin Fritch at Cape May homeport

The homeport of Lawrence Lawson and her sister ship, Rollin Fritch is the Coast Guard Training Center in Cape May. According to the Cape May County Herald local citizens welcome the Coast Guard presence, and its contribution to the local economy.

== Operational history ==
Days after President Donald Trump announced he was making a large cut to the Coast Guard's budget the Coast Guard diverted Lawrence Lawson to Washington DC, where senior members of the military and Congress toured the vessel.

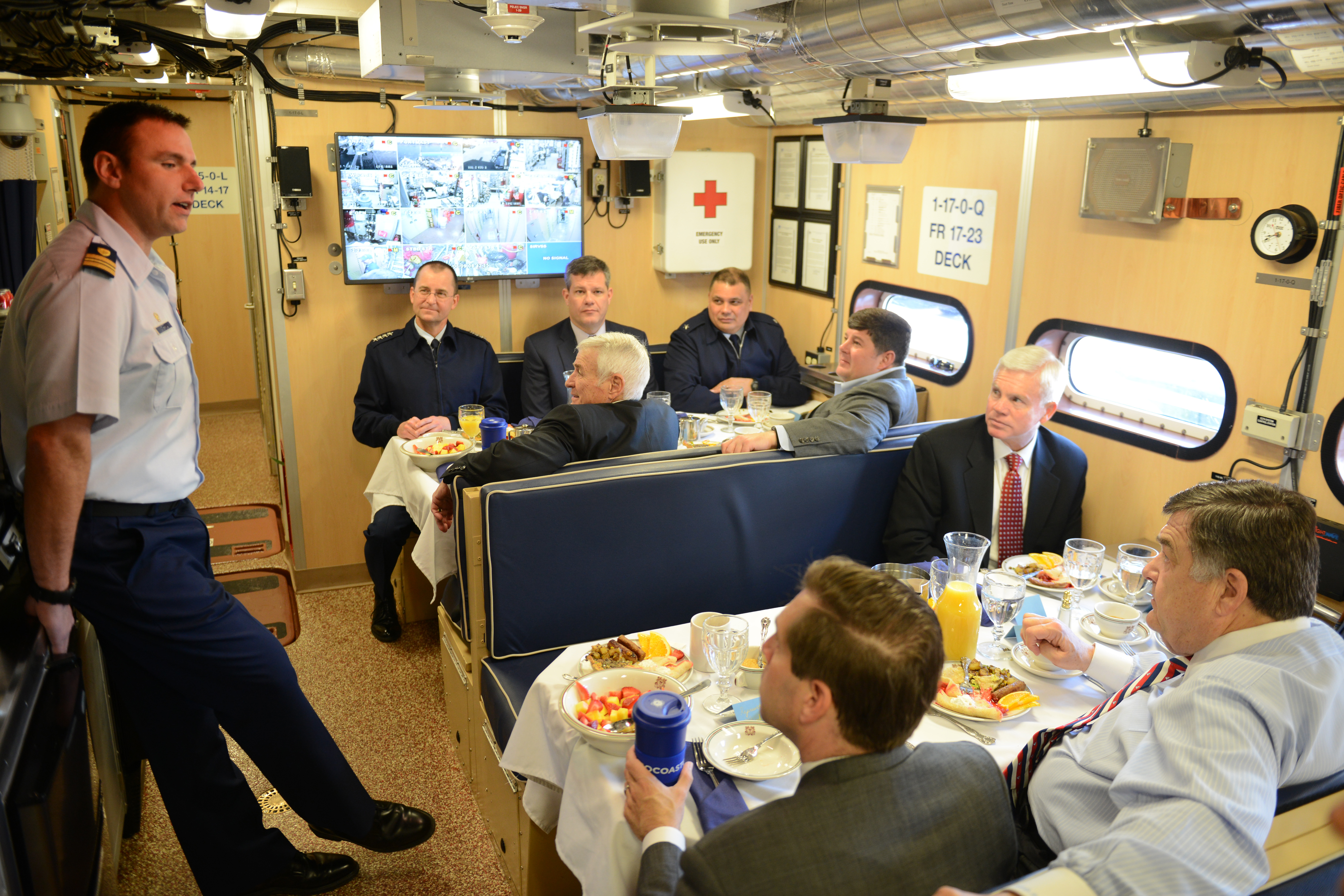
Congressmen listen to Lieutenant Commander Joe Rizzo, when his vessel, the USCGC Lawrence Lawson visited Washington DC

== Namesake ==
The vessel is named in honor of Lawrence O. Lawson, who served as the United States Lifesaving Service's stationkeeper in Evanston, Illinois on the shore of Lake Michigan. With the exception of Lawson, the lifesaving station was staffed entirely by students at Northwestern University. Among the many rescues launched from the station, Lawson was most acclaimed for leading a six-man surfboat crew through a blizzard on the night of November 28, 1889 to rescue the crew of the shipwrecked steamer Calumet. The eighteen crewmen aboard Calumet were brought safely ashore in three trips through heavy surf. Lawson and each of his crew of students were awarded the Gold Lifesaving Medal.

In 2010, Master Chief Petty Officer of the Coast Guard Charles "Skip" W. Bowen, the U.S. Coast Guard's senior enlisted person at the time, lobbied for the new Sentinel-class cutters to be named after enlisted Coast Guardsmen, or personnel from its precursor services, who had distinguished themselves by their heroism.
