= Monitoring Station Designator =

Signals determination

Monitoring Station Designators were used by the United States Army Signals Intelligence Service to designate a specific signal intelligence monitoring station in order to allow analysts to understand the source and type of SIGINT they were analyzing. These were used as shorthand rather than writing or typing out the PLA (Plain Language Address), which consisted of the formal unit name and location of the unit who performed the signals collection.

== Period of Use ==
These designators were used from the 1930s through the end of World War II. They were replaced after the end of the war with SIGADs (SIGINT Activity Designators), which are similar in format and application.

Two facilities, Vint Hill and Two Rock Ranch, were operated by the NSA until the 1970s.

== General Format ==
The general format of the Monitoring Station Designators was the alphabetic characters MS followed by one or two numeric characters. Typically the alphabetic characters and numeric character(s) were separated by a dash character.

== Example Designators ==
The following table provides several examples of Monitoring Station Designators from the World War II era. Sites noted with USA were run by the United States Army, while sites noted with USN were operated by United States Navy.

Site	MS Designator	Navy Designator
Vint Hill Farms, VA (USA)	MS-1	
Two Rock Ranch, Petaluma, CA (USA)	MS-2	
Miami, FL (USA)	MS-3	
Asmara, Ethiopia (USA)	MS-4	
Territory of Hawaii (USA)	MS-5	
Amchitka, AK (USA)	MS-6	
Wireless Experimental Center, New Delhi, India (USA element)	MS-8	
Bellmore, NY (USA)	MS-9	
Santa Rosa, CA (USA)	MS-10	
Radio Corporation of America	MS-12	
Fort Sam Houston, TX (USA)	MS-17	
United Kingdom sources (includes Beaumanor)	MS-92	
Commonwealth sources (Canada - Examination Unit, National Research Council)	MS-94	E
Cable Censor (USN)	MS-59	
Federal Communications Commission	MS-81	
Cheltenham, MD (USN)	MS-56	M
Bainbridge Island, WA (USN)	MS-54	S
Jupiter, FL (USN)	MS-55	J
