= United States Coast Guard Training Center Birmingham-Southern =

USCG Training Center Birmingham-Southern Seal

United States Coast Guard Training Center Birmingham-Southern (TRANCENB-S) is the U.S. Coast Guard Leadership Development Center (LDC) in Birmingham, Alabama since 5 June 2026. TRANCENB-S will also become the home of the Chief Petty Officers Academy (CPOA) which will relocate from Training Center Petaluma. Together, these programs will become the Enlisted Leadership Center of Excellence. TRANCENB-S will become the home of the Coast Guard Force Readiness Command (FORCECOM), which will relocate from Norfolk, Virginia.

TRANCENB-S is the former 192-acre campus of Birmingham–Southern College (BSC), which the USCG purchased and has transformed into a training center in 2026. The new center will have 14 classrooms, 15 buildings, be able to house 1,200 trainees as well as 1,000 support personnel. The campus expands the training capacity of the USCG along with centers in Yorktown and Petaluma. The USCG is phasing in the training programs at TRANCENB-S as buildings are being evaluated and upgraded for use by the LDC.

On 5 September 2026, the first Leadership and Management School graduating class continued the traditions of BSC by ringing the graduation bell near the school's auditorium.

== See also ==
- USCG Training Center Cape May (Basic Training)
- USCG Training Center Petaluma ("A" and "C" Schools)
- USCG Training Center Yorktown ("A" School and Officer Candidate School)
- United States Coast Guard Academy New London
