= USCGC Rollin Fritch =

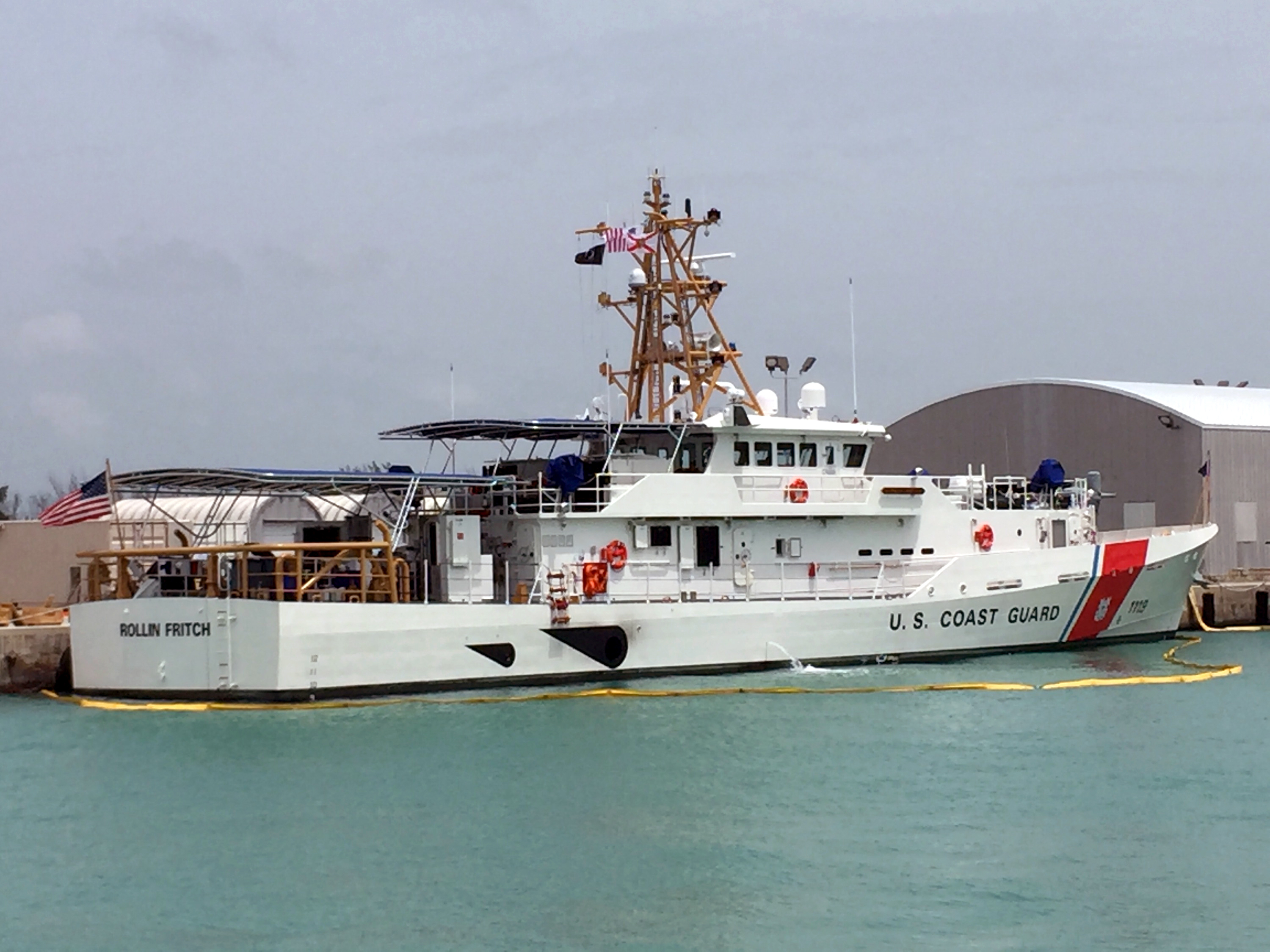
- Rollin Fritch prepares to head to her homeport, Cape May, New Jersey, on September 1, 2016

History

United States
- Name: Rollin Fritch
- Namesake: Rollin Arnold Fritch
- Operator: United States Coast Guard
- Builder: Bollinger Shipyards, Lockport, Louisiana
- Launched: August 23, 2016
- Acquired: August 23, 2016
- Commissioned: November 19, 2016
- Home port: Cape May, New Jersey
- Identification: MMSI number: 338926419; Callsign: NDOG; Hull number: WPC-1119
- Motto: Until properly relieved
- Status: in active service
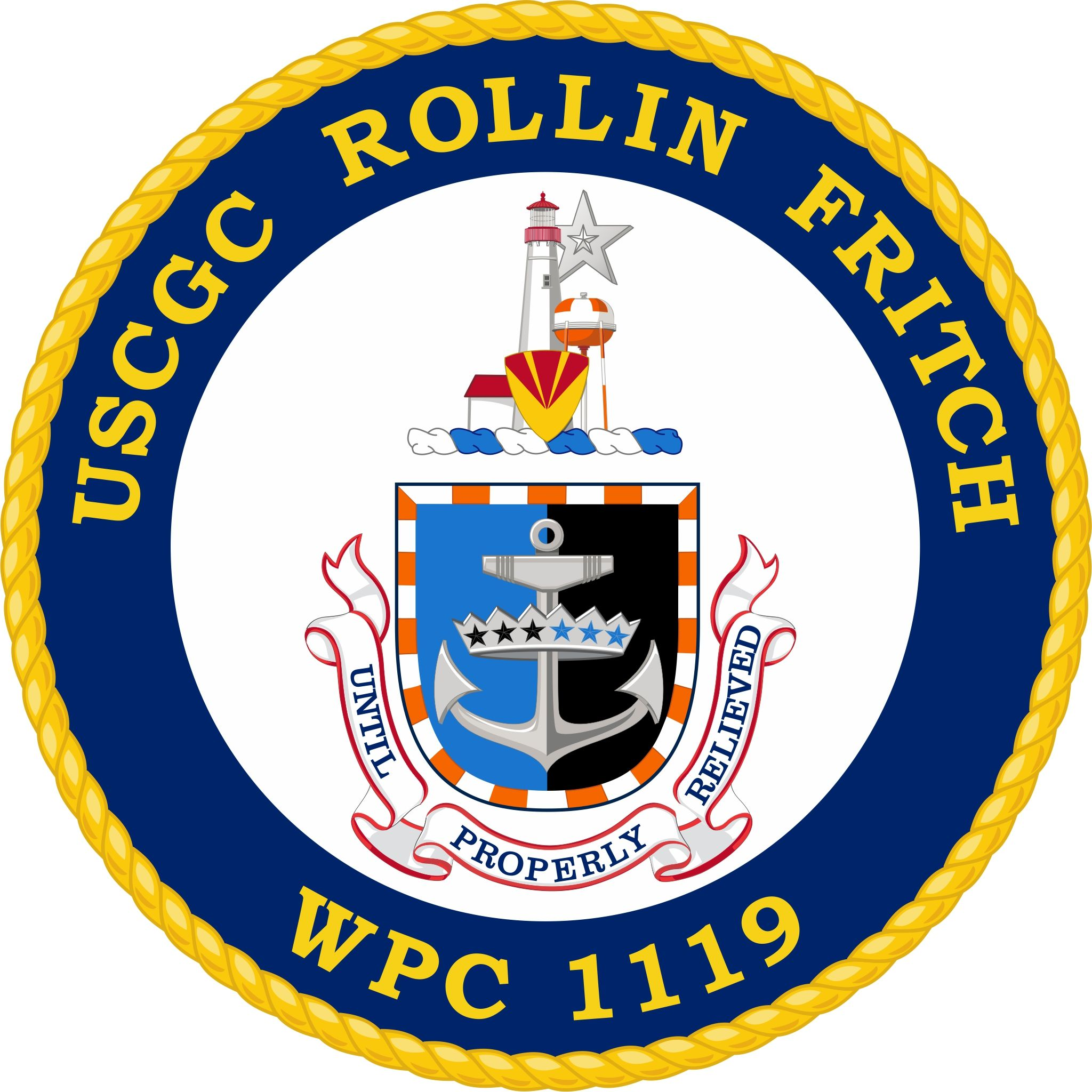
- Badge

General characteristics
- Class & type: Sentinel-class cutter
- Displacement: 353 long tons (359 t)
- Length: 46.8 m (154 ft)
- Beam: 8.11 m (26.6 ft)
- Depth: 2.9 m (9.5 ft)
- Propulsion: 2 × 4,300 kW (5,800 shp); 1 × 75 kW (101 shp) bow thruster
- Speed: 28 knots (52 km/h; 32 mph)
- Range: 2,500 nautical miles (4,600 km; 2,900 mi)
- Endurance: 5 days
- Boats & landing craft carried: 1 × Short Range Prosecutor RHIB
- Complement: 2 officers, 20 crew
- Sensors & processing systems: L-3 C4ISR suite
- Armament: 1 × Mk 38 Mod 2 25 mm automatic gun; 4 × crew-served Browning M2 machine guns

USCGC Rollin Fritch is the US Coast Guard's 19th Sentinel-class cutter, and the first to be homeported outside of the Caribbean. She is based at the Coast Guard Training Center in Cape May, New Jersey.

Like her sister ships she was built in the Bollinger Shipyards, in Lockport, Louisiana. She was delivered for her sea trials on August 23, 2016, and commissioned on November 19, 2016.

== Design ==
Rollin Fritch, like her sister Sentinel-class cutters, is designed with an endurance of five days, and 2,950 nautical miles (5,460 km). She is armed with a 25 mm autocannon, gyro-stabilized, and fired from a sensor equipped remote weapons station on the bridge, supplemented by four crew-served M2 Browning machine guns. Her maximum speed is in excess of 28 knots (52 km/h).

She carries a waterjet-propelled high-speed pursuit boat, deployed and retrieved via a stern launching ramp. The ramp allows the pursuit boat to be deployed and retrieved without bringing the cutter to a stop.

== Operational duty ==
Rollin Fritch, like her sister ships, is designed for search and rescue, and the interception of smugglers. Her high-speed waterjet-propelled pursuit boat, launched from her stern launching ramp, make her a potent weapon for the interception of smugglers.

== Homeported in Cape May ==
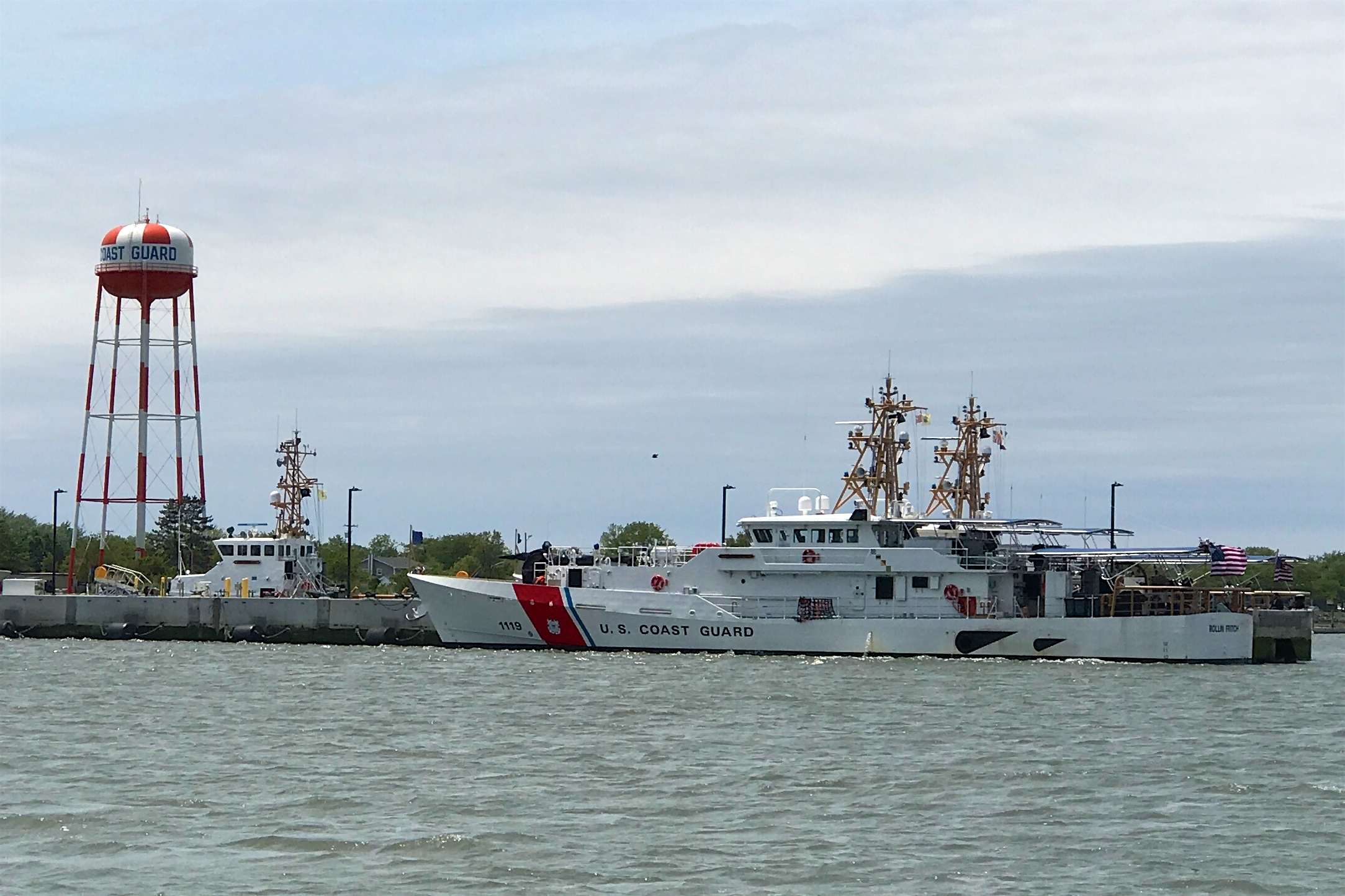
Rollin Fritch at Cape May homeport

The homeport of Rollin Fritch and her sister ship, Lawrence O. Lawson is the Coast Guard Training Center in Cape May. According to the Cape May County Herald local citizens welcome the Coast Guard presence, and its contribution to the local economy.

== Namesake ==
Rollin A. Fritch was a Coast Guard seaman who earned a posthumous Silver Star for his service on the transport USS Callaway during World War II. Fritch served as a gunner who was seen bravely firing his anti-aircraft gun at a kamikaze aircraft right up until it struck the bridge where his gun was sited.

In 2010, Charles "Skip" W. Bowen, who was then the United States Coast Guard's most senior non-commissioned officer, proposed that all cutters in the Sentinel class should be named after enlisted sailors in the Coast Guard, or one of its precursor services, who were recognized for their heroism. In 2014 the Coast Guard announced that Fritch would be the namesake of the 19th cutter.
