= United States Coast Guard Training Center Petaluma =

Coast Guard training facility in California

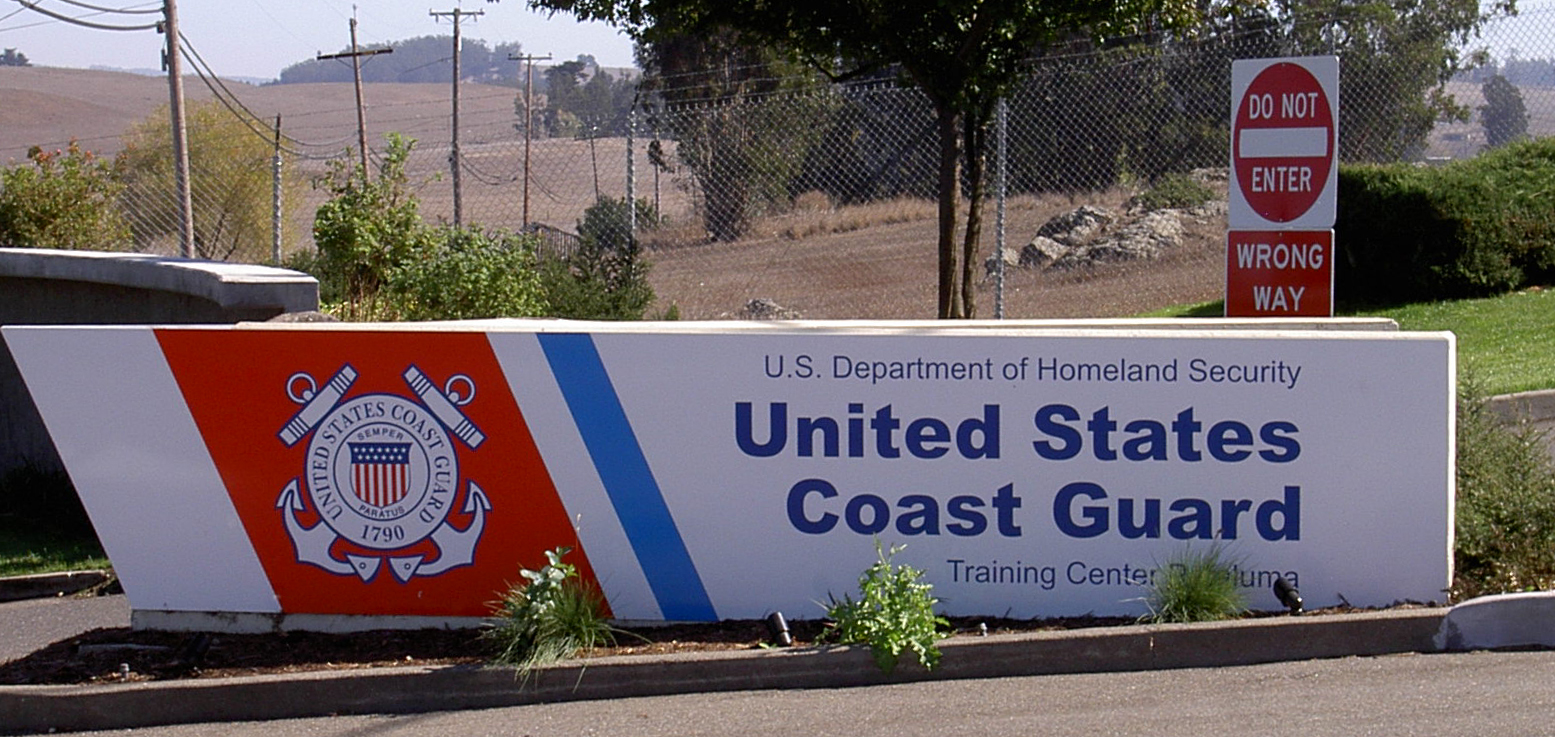
Entrance sign in 2008

Training Center Petaluma is a Coast Guard training facility in the northern California counties of Sonoma and Marin. Formerly the installation was the United States Army "Two Rock Station" . Approximately 4,000 military students train there each year. It is the only Coast Guard training center or large installation without a major operational component (air station, motor life boat station, etc) or waterfront.

The training center is located in a rural area north of San Francisco at 38.25°N 122.79°W. It is about 9 mi (14 km) from the coast and 9 mi (14 km) west of the city of Petaluma, California, west of the junction of Tomales Road and Valley Ford Road, just south of Stemple Creek and the village of Two Rock, California.

The facility occupies more than 800 acres (320 ha) of land, which include 129 family housing units and 90 other buildings. A small town, the training center also has a movie theater, RV and camping spots, over 10 miles of hiking and walking trails, barbershop and hair salon, tailor, chapel with regular services, bowling alley, and other amenities. Public safety is provided by a Coast Guard Fire Department and a mix of Coast Guard Military Police and contracted private security, though emergency medical services including advanced life support and ambulance transport is provided by local civilian agencies. An on-installation medical clinic provides non-emergency general outpatient healthcare for active duty and reserve service members, while dependents and retirees are seen on the local civilian network.

== Rating specific training schools ==
Students at the individual "A" schools receive entry-level training in one of these ratings:

- Aviation Survival Technician (AST)
- Electronics Technician (ET)
- Culinary Specialist (CS)
- Health Service Technician (HS)
- Information System Technician (IT)
- Operations Specialist (OS)
- Storekeeper (SK)
- Yeoman (YN)

Graduates of these "A" schools can be advanced to petty officer third class and are then assigned to a new duty station.

"C" school training is also offered for advanced training in each of these ratings, including a National Registry Emergency Medical Technician course and others.

=== Subject matter specialists and course writers ===
Each of the "A" schools at Training Center Petaluma has subject matter specialists and course writers assigned for the purpose of developing up to date course materials and instructional aids relative to each rating. These specialists are usually chief petty officers with substantial experience within their rating. Courses developed are used in the field to help enlisted persons learn new skills in their rating. Advancement is dependent in successful completion of these courses and passing grades on service-wide examinations in each rating.

== Chief Petty Officer Academy ==
The United States Coast Guard operates the Chief Petty Officer Academy at the Training Center Petaluma. This academy trains chief petty officers for the Coast Guard and master sergeants for the U.S. Air Force.

Enlisted Coast Guardsmen who have advanced to chief petty officer, must attend the Chief Petty Officer Academy, or an equivalent Department of Defense school, to be advanced senior chief petty officer; United States Air Force Master sergeants, as well as international students representing their respective maritime services, are also eligible to attend the academy. The basic themes of this school are:

- Professionalism
- Leadership
- Communications
- Systems thinking and lifelong learning

== Other advanced training ==
Other schools offered include advanced leadership training in course design, instructor development, professional development as well as instructional systems training.

== History ==
The U.S. Army built a top-secret communications station on this site during World War II. The facility was one of the major radio intercept posts in the United States, referred to by a Monitoring Station Designator. To deter Japanese attention and to fool aerial reconnaissance, the station was camouflaged to look like a local dairy farm, named "Two Rock Ranch" with most operations occurring underground in concrete tunnels and bunkers. Above ground buildings, including command buildings, were built to look like farmhouses, barns and other outbuildings common to the area. The Coast Guard beat out several other interested parties including the California Highway Patrol for the surplus property after modern technologies and changing threats made the station obsolete, and took possession during a change-of-command ceremony on July 1, 1971. "Training Center Petaluma" was chosen as a name over several others because Petaluma would be more easy to find on a map to traveling personnel than Two Rock.

In the mid 1990s, the base twice faced closure under the Base Realignment and Closure Act, but was saved thanks in part to significant local community support, the closure of the Coast Guard Training Center at Governors Island, New York and a surge in recruits following the September 11th, 2001 attacks.

== Community involvement ==
Training Center Petaluma plays a large role in the local community. A significant population of the employees both civilian, military and others live throughout Sonoma and Marin counties. The Coast Guard Fire Department is tied into local emergency dispatch and frequently provides mutual aid to the local community.

== See also ==
- United States Coast Guard Training Center Birmingham-Southern
- USCG Training Center Cape May (Basic Training)
- USCG Training Center Yorktown ("A" School and Officer Candidate School)
- United States Coast Guard Academy New London
