= Coast Guard Training Center Yorktown =

US Coast Guard training facility in Yorktown, Virginia

Coordinates: 37.21993°N 76.48458°W

Department of Homeland Security United States Coast Guard
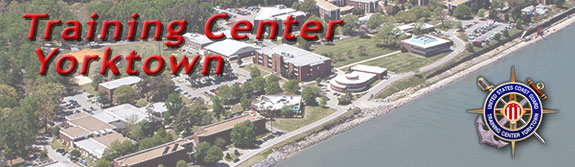
- Aerial view of Yorktown Training Center
- Active: 1957–Present
- Country: United States
- Branch: United States Coast Guard
- Size: 500+
- Motto: "Forge Today’s Force to Execute Tomorrow’s Mission"
- Equipment: Patrol boats

The United States Coast Guard Training Center (TRACEN) in Yorktown, Virginia, is one of eight major Coast Guard training facilities in the United States. The others are Training Center Petaluma, Training Center Cape May, Aviation Training Center, located in Mobile, Alabama, Leadership Development Center, located in New London, Connecticut, Maritime Law Enforcement Academy, located in Charleston, South Carolina, Special Missions Training Center, Camp LeJeune, North Carolina, and the Aviation Technical Training Center, located in Elizabeth City, North Carolina. TRACEN Cape May is the only U.S. Coast Guard Base used for Basic Military Training or "boot camp". TRACEN Yorktown, TRACEN Petaluma, Maritime Law Enforcement Academy, and the Aviation Technical Training Center are locations for Coast Guard's apprentice level "A" and advanced level "C" Schools.

== TRACEN Yorktown history ==
In 1917, The United States Navy purchased 400,000 acres (160,000 ha) of the Yorktown peninsula to serve as a fuel depot. In 1942 the U.S. Navy housed their Mine Warfare Training School on the land. The U.S. Coast Guard took possession of the school in 1957 and established the Reserve Training Center or RTC. The purpose of the RTC was to become the home of Coast Guard Officer Candidate School. RTC was moved to the U.S. Coast Guard Academy in New London, CT in 1998. RTC was formerly a large summer training program for reservists. In 1998 the command was renamed Training Center Yorktown.

== Training ==
Training at TRACEN Yorktown is extensive. The training is designed to instill a profound understanding of technical and leadership skills in order to perform duties in a leadership role as a petty officer. The duration of "A" School training is typically 10 to 19 weeks depending on the course. Permanently assigned personnel include active duty, reserve, and civilian instructional, curriculum design and support staff. Students include Coast Guard active duty, reservists, and auxiliarists. Additionally, TRACEN Yorktown provides training to other U.S. military services and agencies, and foreign military and coast guard personnel.

=== "A" Schools ===
"A" School is an entry-level training course in a particular rating. The U.S. Coast Guard offers seven "A" school courses at TRACEN Yorktown.

- Intelligence specialist
- Gunner's mate
- Electrician's mate
- Boatswain's mate
- Marine science technician
- Machinery technician
- Damage controlman

=== International training ===
The U.S. Coast Guard offers opportunities for foreign coast guard members to experience U.S. military training. This training enhances military skills and advances technical understanding. The international training course is 15 weeks long.

== Base services ==
The Coast Guard is unique in that all other military branches have large bases with many services. The Coast Guard has many small stations that do not have those services. However, there are a few bases that the Coast Guard operate with all the services that other branches have on their bases. TRACEN Yorktown is one of those bases.

The Training Center has a number of services:

- Auto hobby shop
- Barber shop
- Chapel
- Clinic
- Credit union
- Cyber cafe
- Dry cleaner
- Coast Guard Exchange
- Dining facility
- Gym
- Subway
- Movie theater
- All hands' club

== Reporting ==
All students reporting to TRACEN Yorktown will receive instruction on base policies during indoctrination and must follow the instructions provided on their official orders. "C" School students will report to Lafayette or Cain Hall, depending on their paygrade, for room assignments.

== See also ==
- United States Coast Guard Training Center Birmingham-Southern
- USCG Training Center Cape May (Basic Training)
- USCG Training Center Petaluma ("A" and "C" Schools)
- United States Coast Guard Academy New London
