= USS Callaway =

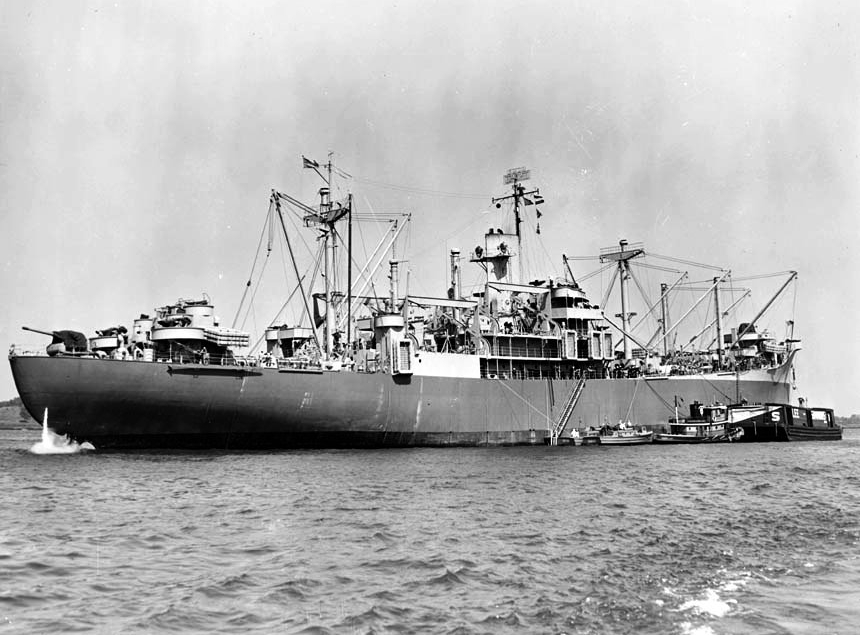
- Callaway at anchor

History

United States
- Name: Callaway
- Namesake: Callaway County, Missouri
- Builder: Western Pipe & Steel
- Laid down: 10 June 1942
- Launched: 10 October 1942
- Sponsored by: Mrs W. P. Maneull
- Christened: Sea Mink
- Commissioned: 24 April 1943
- Decommissioned: 10 May 1946
- Renamed: USS Callaway, President Harrison, President Fillmore, Hurricane.
- Identification: APA-35
- Honors and awards: Six battle stars for service in World War II.
- Fate: Scrapped 1974
- Notes: WPS Hull No. 82.; MC Hull No. 270.; Type C3-S-A2.

General characteristics
- Class & type: Bayfield-class attack transport
- Displacement: 8,100 long tons (8,200 t); 16,100 long tons (16,400 t) fully loaded
- Length: 492 ft (150 m)
- Beam: 69 ft 6 in (21.18 m)
- Draft: 26 ft 6 in (8.08 m)
- Propulsion: General Electric geared turbine, 2 x Combustion Engineering D-type boilers, single propeller, 8,500 shp (6,300 kW)
- Speed: 18 knots (33 km/h; 21 mph)
- Boats & landing craft carried: 12 x LCVP; 4 x LCM (Mk-6); 3 x LCP(L) (MK-IV)
- Capacity: 200,000 ft^{3} (5,700 m^{3})
- Complement: Crew: 51 officers, 524 enlisted; Flag: 43 officers, 108 enlisted.; Troops: 80 officers, 1,146 enlisted
- Armament: 2 × single 5 in (127 mm)/38 cal. dual purpose gun mounts; 2 × twin 40 mm AA gun mounts forward, port and starboard.; 2 × single 40 mm AA gun mounts.; 18 × single 20 mm AA gun mounts.

USS Callaway (APA-35) was a Bayfield-class attack transport that served with the US Navy, and was crewed by the United States Coast Guard during World War II.

Initially designated as a Navy Transport AP-80, Callaway was quickly re-designated as attack transport APA-35. The vessel was launched 10 October 1942 as Sea Mink by Western Pipe and Steel, San Francisco, California, under a Maritime Commission contract, acquired by the navy 24 April 1943, and commissioned the same day.

== Operational history ==
=== Kwajalein ===
Callaway sailed from Norfolk, Virginia, on 23 October 1943 to San Diego, California, and trained with United States Marine Corps to prepare for the first of her five assault landings. Joining Task Force (TF) 53 at Lahaina Roads, Hawaii, Callaway sailed for Kwajalein, where she landed troops in the assault that overwhelmed the defenders on 31 January 1944.

=== Emirau and Saipan ===
After staging at Guadalcanal, Callaway proceeded combat loaded for the occupation of Emirau where her troops landed on 20 March 1944. Transfers of troops and cargo in the Solomons and Ellices, and training at Pearl Harbor continued until 29 May, when Callaway got underway for her third assault invasion, Saipan on 15 June. Laden with casualties, Callaway returned to Pearl Harbor to embark army troops for rehearsal landings at Guadalcanal.

=== Guadalcanal ===
Callaway set out for Guadalcanal on 12 August. On 17 September, the transport launched her troops in the assault on Angaur in the Palaus, then returned to Manus and New Guinea to prepare for her assignment to the first reinforcement echelon for the northern Leyte landings.

=== Leyte ===
Arriving in Leyte Gulf 22 October, Callaway landed her troops with the speed and ease born of experience, then retired through the raging Battle for Leyte Gulf for a month of operations supporting the Leyte campaign. These brought the transport back to Leyte 23 November, where she joined in driving off enemy air attacks as she disembarked her troops.

=== Battle damaged at Lingayen ===
Preparations in New Guinea preceded in the Lingayen assault, in which Callaway distinguished herself as a member of the Blue Beach Attack Group. As the invasion force sailed north, desperate Japanese kamikaze aircraft suicide attacks were launched in a determined effort to break up the landings, and on 8 January 1945, a kamikaze broke through heavy antiaircraft fire to crash on the starboard wing of Callaway's bridge. The resulting fires were contained, but 29 of Callaway's crew were killed and 22 wounded. Despite this loss, the attack transport resumed active duty the following day. Temporary repairs at Ulithi put her back in action by early February, when she carried Marine reinforcements from Guam to Iwo Jima, and returned with wounded from that battle to Guam, arriving on 8 March.

For the next three months, Callaway transported men and equipment between the bases and operating areas of the western Pacific, then embarked Japanese prisoners of war at Pearl Harbor, whom she carried to San Francisco, arriving 16 June 1945.

=== After hostilities ===
Following the Japanese surrender Callaway returned after an overhaul to Pearl Harbor on 27 August, loaded occupation troops, and sailed to disembark them at Wakayama, Japan. Two transpacific voyages carrying homeward bound veterans ended with Callaway's own return to San Francisco on 12 March 1946. The transport then sailed to New York where she was decommissioned on 10 May 1946. For service in World War II, Callaway received six battle stars.

== Commercial service ==
Callaway was sold to American President Lines in March 1949, which converted her back to a cargo ship, with facilities to also carry up to twelve passengers, and renamed the vessel President Harrison. Her name was changed on 10 March 1966 to President Fillmore (IV). On 24 April 1968 she was acquired by the Waterman Steamship Company and renamed Hurricane. Like many of her former Bayfield-class sister ships, Hurricane was scrapped at Kaohsiung, Taiwan, in 1974

== Legacy ==
In 2016 the United States Coast Guard accepted delivery of the Sentinel-class cutter USCGC Rollin A. Fritch, named after Rollin Arnold Fritch, a gunner who died shooting at 9 January 1945 kamikaze.
