= Lawrence O. Lawson =

Swedish-American lifesaving station keeper (1842–1912)

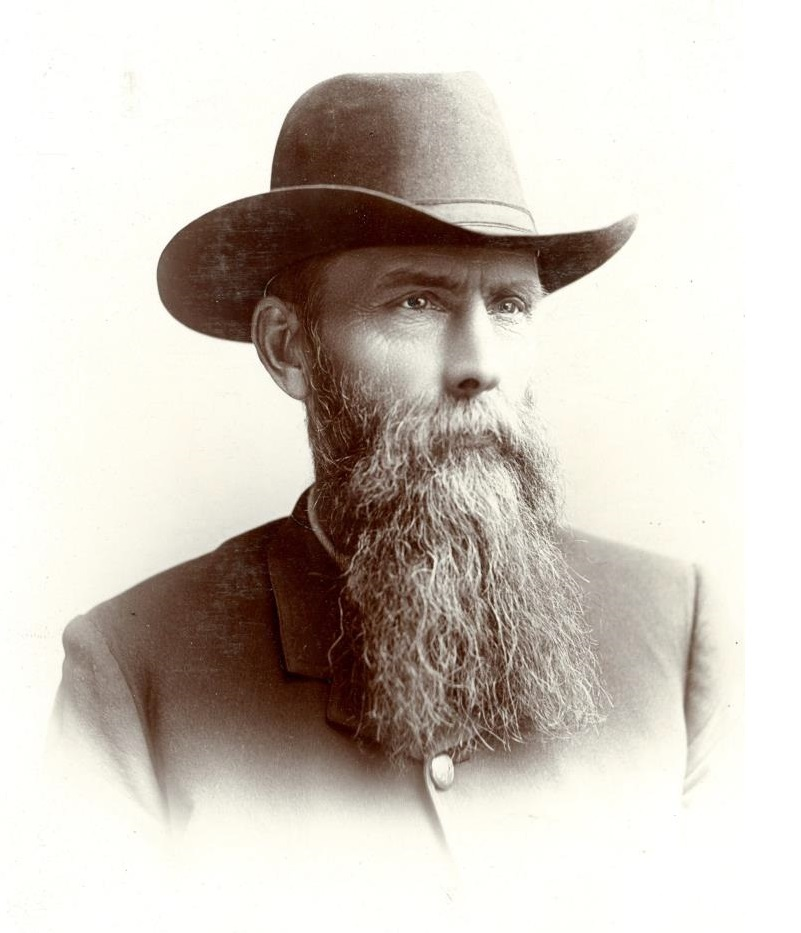
Lawrence O. Lawson

Lawrence Oscar Lawson (September 11, 1842 – October 29, 1912) was a station keeper in the United States Life-Saving Service. He was given command of the Evanston, Illinois, Life-Saving Station Number 12, District 11 of the United States Life-Saving Service off the coast of Lake Michigan in 1880. As station keeper, Lawson was responsible for selecting and training Northwestern University students to serve as his surfboat crew.

On November 28, 1889, he led the crew of his surfboat on a heroic rescue of all 18 crewmen of the freighter Calumet. On October 17, 1890, Lawson and his six crewmen were awarded the Gold Lifesaving Medal.

== Biography ==
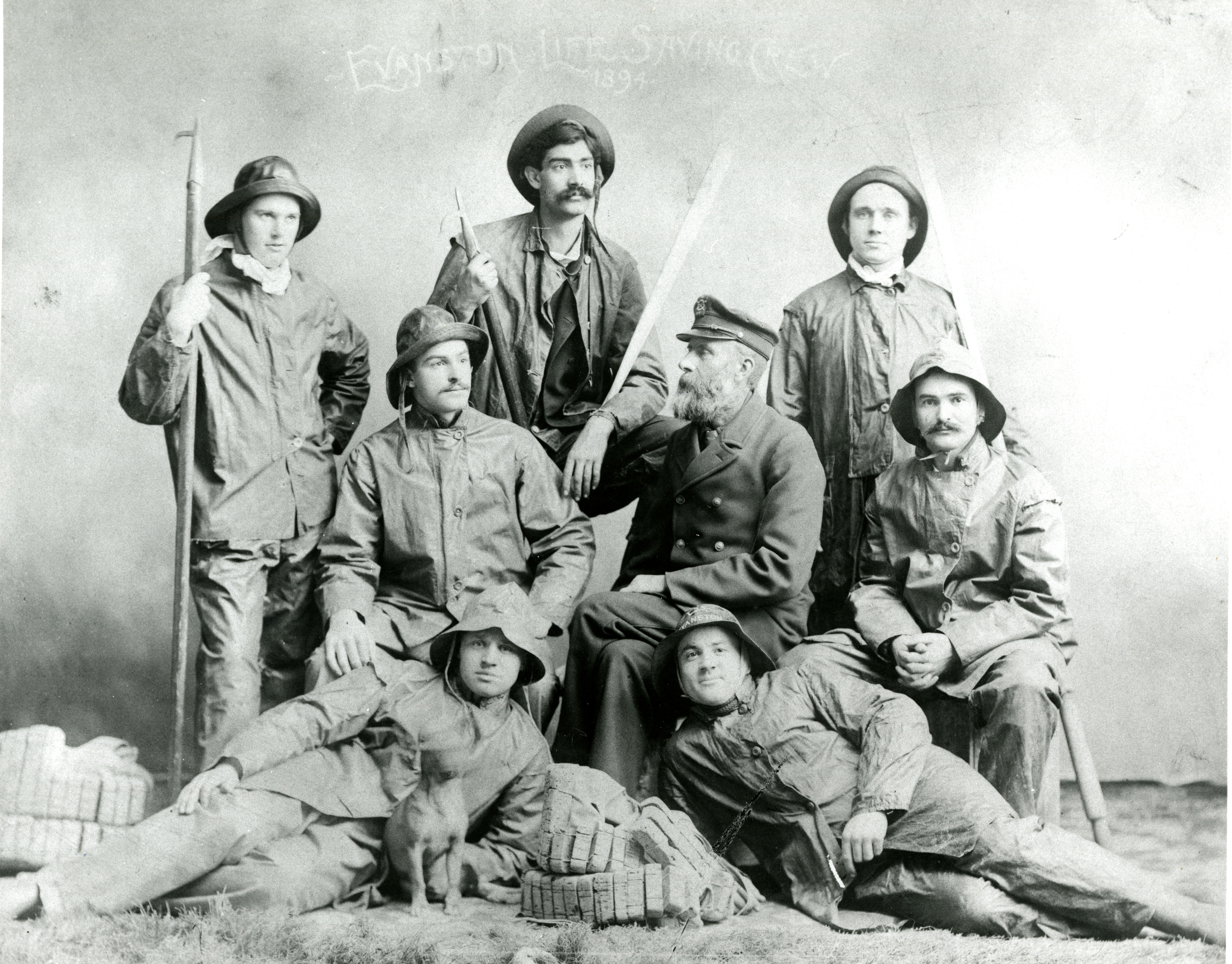
Captain Lawrence O. Lawson, surrounded by his 1894 surfboat crew

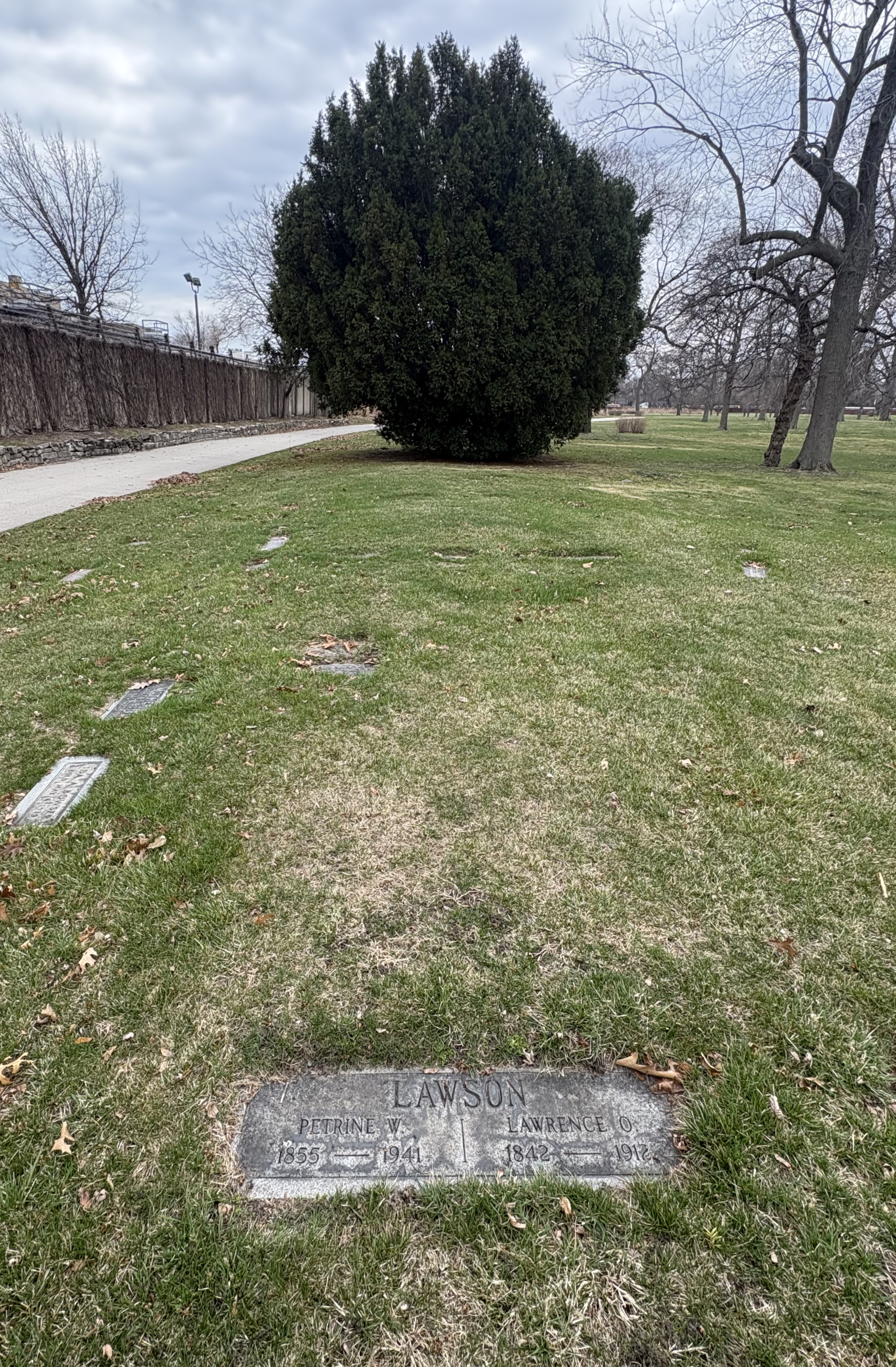
Lawson's grave at Graceland Cemetery

Lawson was born September 11, 1842 in Kalmar County, Sweden. He came to the United States in 1861 while serving a merchant seaman. Lawson married Petrine Wold (1855–1941) in Chicago during 1876. In 1878, they became residents of Evanston, Illinois. He retired in 1903. During his twenty-three years as station keeper, Lawson and his crews responded to 68 shipwrecks and were responsible for saving over four hundred lives.

Lawson died in Evanston on October 29, 1912, and was buried at Graceland Cemetery.

== Legacy ==
In 1988, Lawson Park on the shore of Lake Michigan in Evanston was named in his honor.

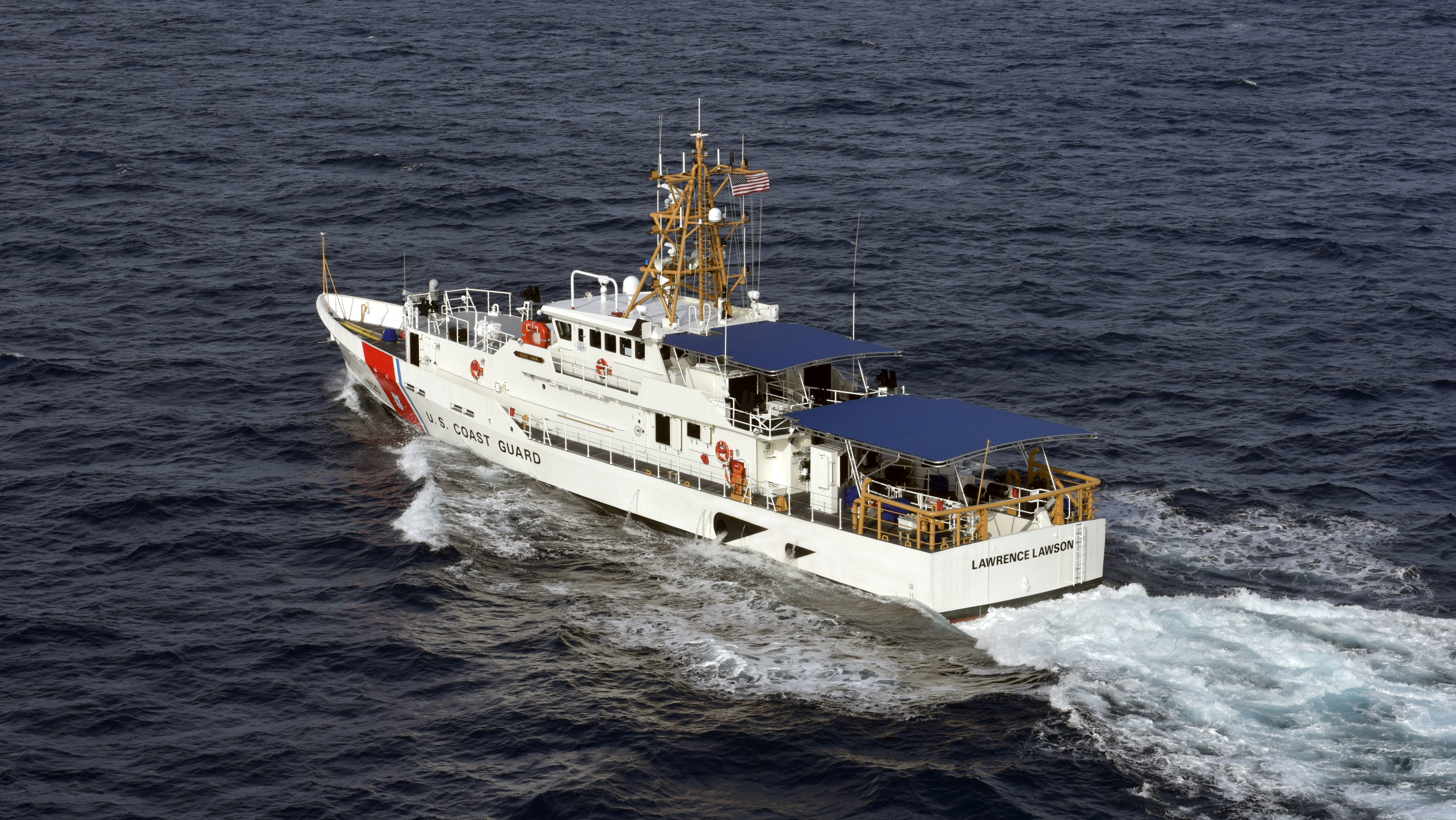
USCGC Lawrence O. Lawson at sea

In 2010, Master Chief Petty Officer of the Coast Guard Charles "Skip" W. Bowen, the U.S. Coast Guard's senior enlisted person at the time, lobbied for the new Sentinel-class cutters to be named after enlisted Coast Guardsmen, or personnel from its precursor services, who had distinguished themselves by their heroism. USCGC Lawrence O. Lawson was the 20th cutter to be launched.
