= United States Coast Guard Training Center Cape May =

US Coast Guard training facility in Cape May, New Jersey

Coordinates: 38°56′42″N 74°53′00″W

- Cape May, New Jersey
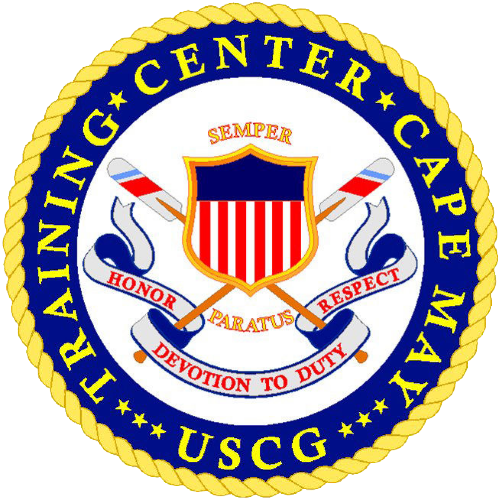

Site information
- Type: Military base
- Owner: United States
- Controlled by: United States Coast Guard
- Open to the public: No

Site history
- Built: 1917
- In use: 1924–present

Garrison information
- Current commander: Captain Amanda M. Lee

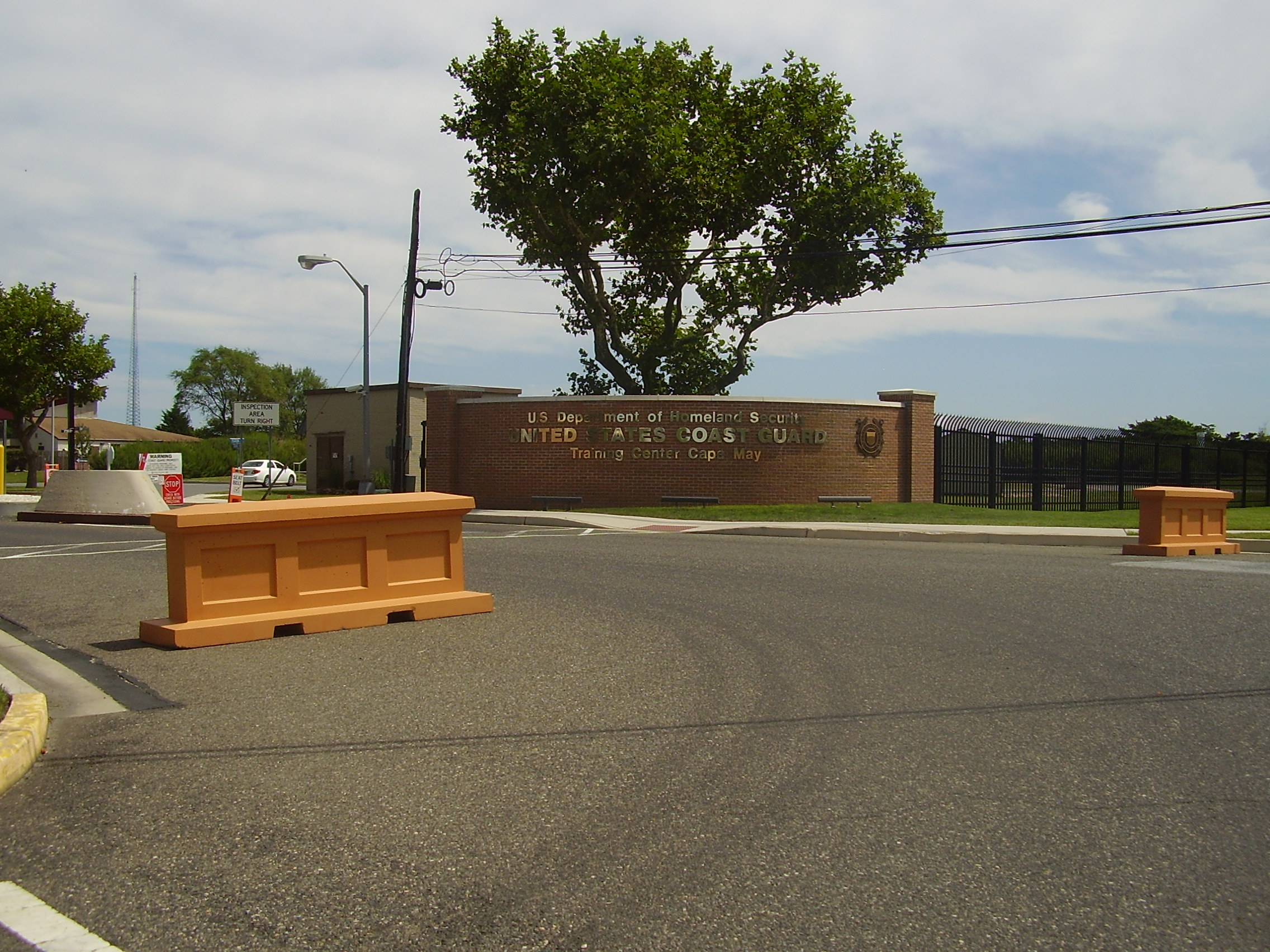
United States Coast Guard Training Center Cape May

United States Coast Guard Training Center Cape May (TRACENCM) is the home of the Coast Guard enlisted corps and is the Coast Guard's only enlisted accession point and recruit training center. It is located at 1 Munro Avenue, Cape May, New Jersey.

== History of the training center ==
Sewell Point, the area occupied by the Training Center, has a long history of naval presence. During the American Revolutionary War and throughout the nineteenth century, Cape May Sound was used as a harbor of refuge. In 1917, the Navy established a "section base" in Cape May to provide training, vessel support and communication facilities for coastal defense. Initially, the Navy converted an abandoned amusement center, built along the oceanfront, for military use. The old skating rink became the mess hall and sleeping quarters, the stage was made into a galley, the "human roulette wheel" – a scrub table and the "barrel of fun" became a brig. When the old wooden structure burned down in 1918, the Navy built standard military facilities along the harbor front (some of these buildings still stand).

After World War I, the base was adapted to accommodate dirigibles. The largest hangar in the world, 700 feet long and over 100 feet tall, was built to accommodate an airship under construction in Britain. However, the R38 (ZR-2) crashed on its test flight and "lighter-than-air" craft were never fully adopted for Navy use.

In 1924, the U.S. Coast Guard occupied the base and established air facilities for planes used in support of United States Customs Service efforts. During the Prohibition era, several cutters were assigned to Cape May to foil rumrunners operating off the New Jersey coast. After Prohibition, the Coast Guard all but abandoned Cape May leaving a small air/sea rescue contingent. For a short period of time (1929–1934), part of the base was used as a civilian airport. With the advent of World War II, a larger airstrip was constructed and the Navy returned to train aircraft carrier pilots. The over the water approach simulated carrier landings at sea. The Coast Guard also increased its Cape May forces for coastal patrol, anti-submarine warfare, air/sea rescue and buoy service. In 1946, the Navy relinquished the base to the Coast Guard.

In 1948, all entry-level training on the east coast was moved to the U.S. Coast Guard Recruit Receiving Station in Cape May. The Coast Guard consolidated all recruit training functions in Cape May in 1982.

It provides seaman apprentices, fireman apprentices, seamen and firemen to the Coast Guard Fleet – generally en route to "A" schools – as well as sending some personnel directly to "A" schools.

Although modern training facilities have replaced most of the original Naval Base buildings, the Coast Guard is respectful of the history of Sewell Point and their host city.

== Additional roles ==
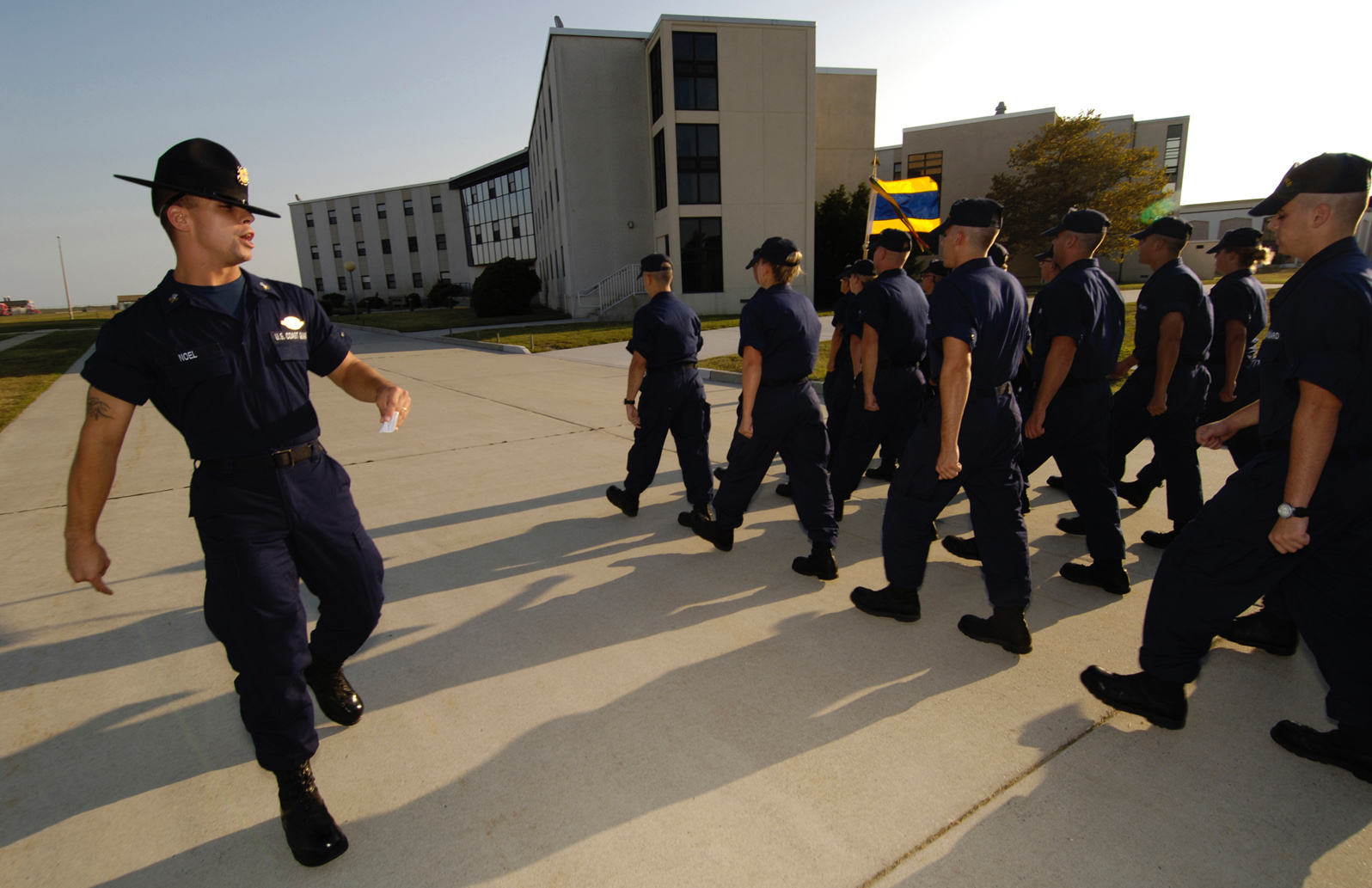
A Company Commander marches his company of trainees at Cape May

In addition to its role as the sole accession point for the Coast Guard's enlisted corps, TRACENCM contains the Coast Guard's recruiter and company commander (i.e. "drill instructor") programs.

Personnel from TRACENCM's ceremonial guard are often called upon by various civic and veterans' organizations to provide an active duty, uniformed military presence at numerous functions throughout the year (e.g. Veterans Day, Memorial Day).

The TRACEN maintains its own active duty and reservist staffed military fire and police departments, as well as ambulance service, that are frequently called for mutual aid in the local areas.

TRACENCM is also home for and provides logistical support to over a dozen tenant commands. These tenant commands in turn perform support and operational missions that include: Search and Rescue; Military Readiness; Port & Environmental Safety; Commercial Vessel Safety; Enforcement of Laws and Treaties; Marine Environmental Response; Military Readiness; Recreational Boating Safety; Aids to Navigation; and Waterways Management. Members of the United States Coast Guard Reserve drill at USCG Station Cape May.

Locally, there exists a United States Coast Guard Auxiliary that supplements maritime and navigational aspects of the greater Training Center community.

Delaware Military Academy has their Basic Leadership Training at the center.

== Coast Guard Community ==
Recognizing the enduring relationship between the greater Cape May region, on the evening of Friday, 8 May 2015, the Commandant of the Coast Guard, Admiral Paul F. Zukunft, proclaimed Cape May County a "Coast Guard Community", one of 17 in the nation.

Earlier in the year, a resolution drafted by state Assemblyman Bob Andrzejczak and Senator Jeff Van Drew proclaimed the first week of each August as "Coast Guard Week".

== Education ==
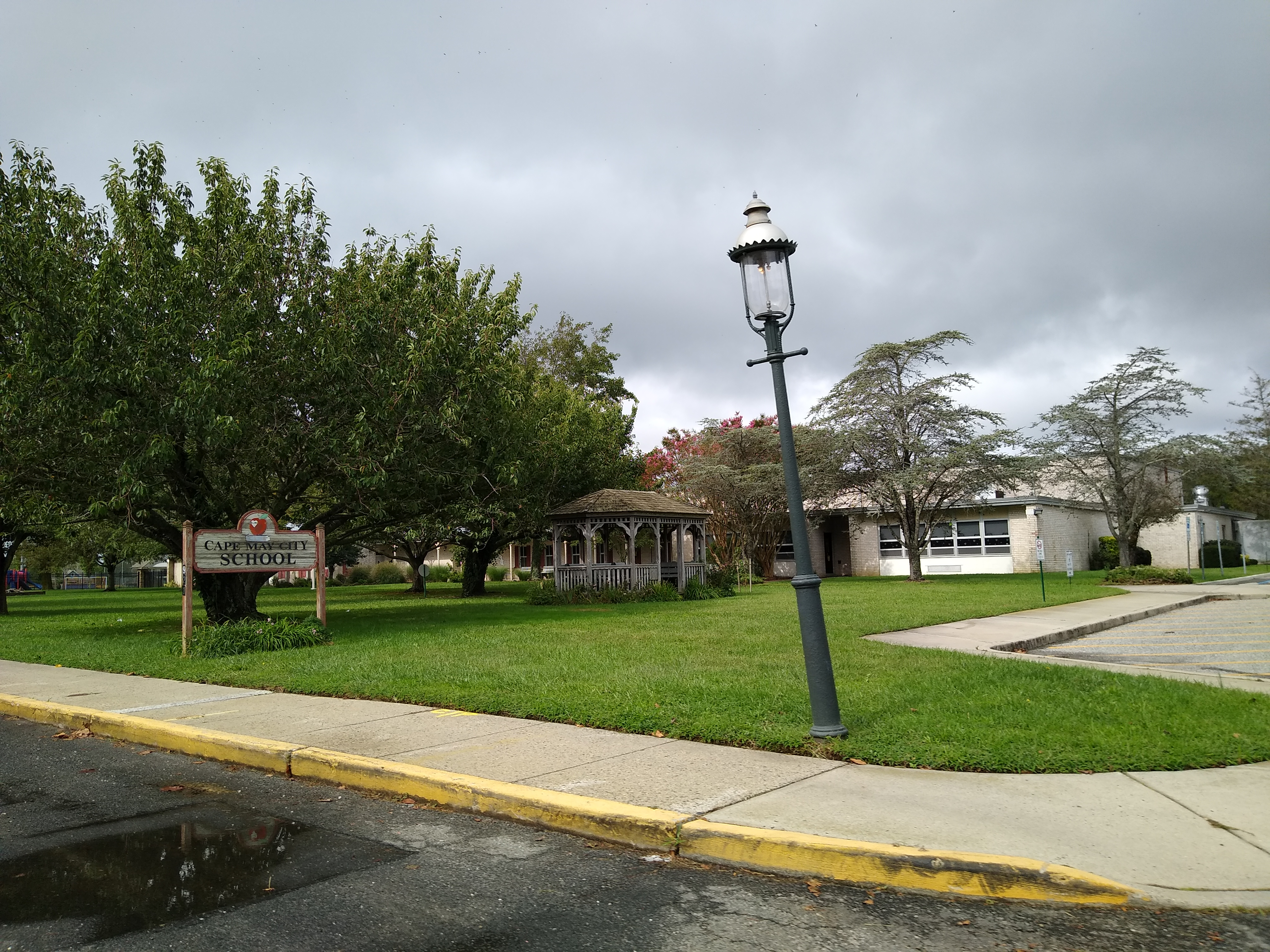
Cape May City Elementary School is the school for elementary-aged children living at the training center. The Coast Guard financially supports the school

Dependent elementary-aged children on the base attend Cape May City Elementary School, the only school of the Cape May City School District. In previous eras the Coast Guard children made up a smaller portion of the student body. Because property values increased in Cape May, fewer local families could afford housing, and the number of Cape May students declined. Prior to the September 11 attacks there were discussions about reducing employee levels and possibly merging Cape May Elementary and West Cape May Elementary School. After September 11 the Coast Guard presence increased and enrollment increased. The influx of families from the Coast Guard base meant that the school remained open. The Coast Guard officially adopted Cape May Elementary in 2012 and it spends about $700,000 annually to support the school. Richard Degener of The Press of Atlantic City wrote "What has always been a symbiotic relationship has grown downright cozy". Secondary students are zoned to Lower Cape May Regional School District facilities: Richard Teitelman Middle School and Lower Cape May Regional High School.

== Gallery ==
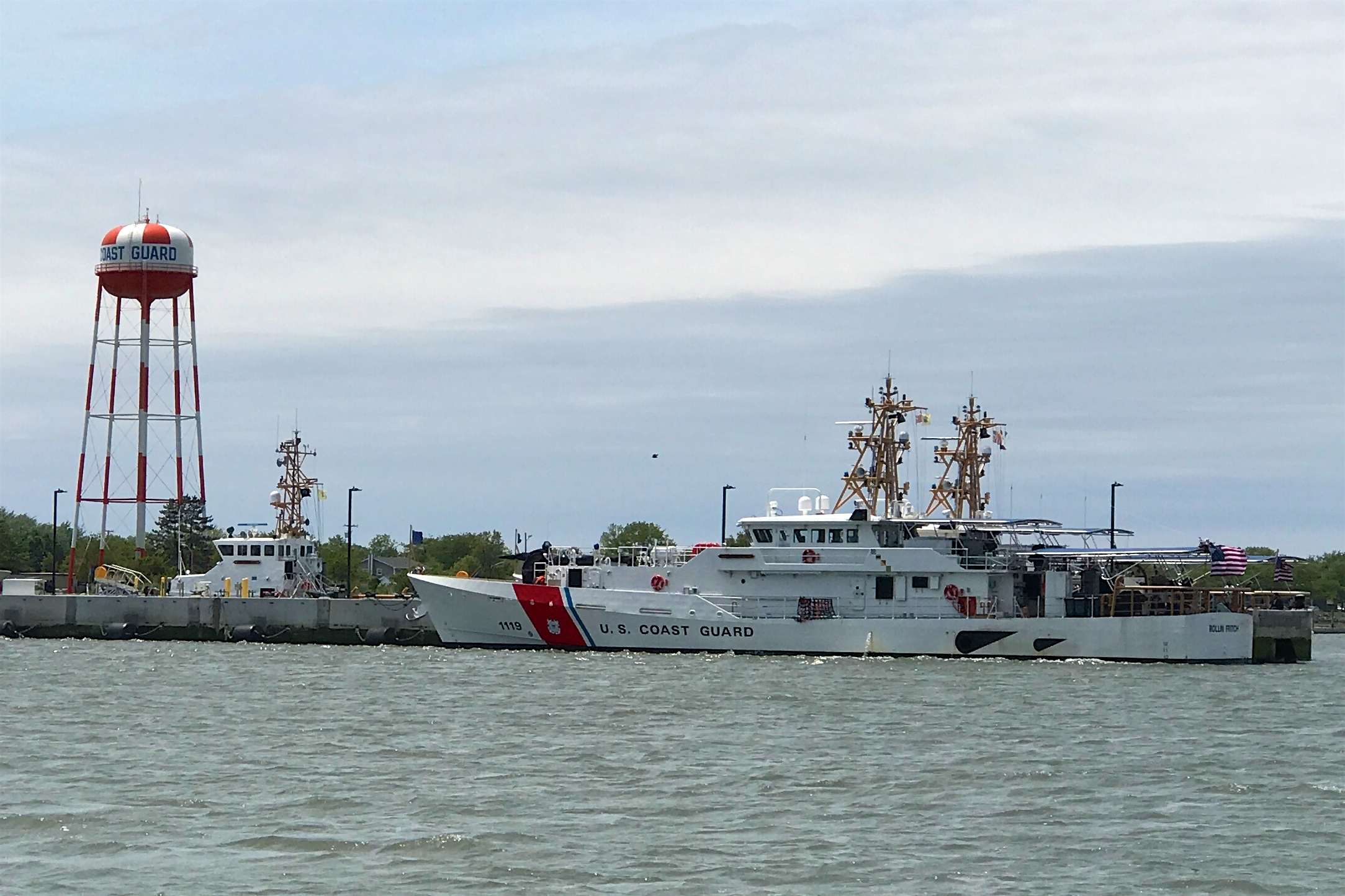
USCGC Rollin A. Fritch at Cape May homeport

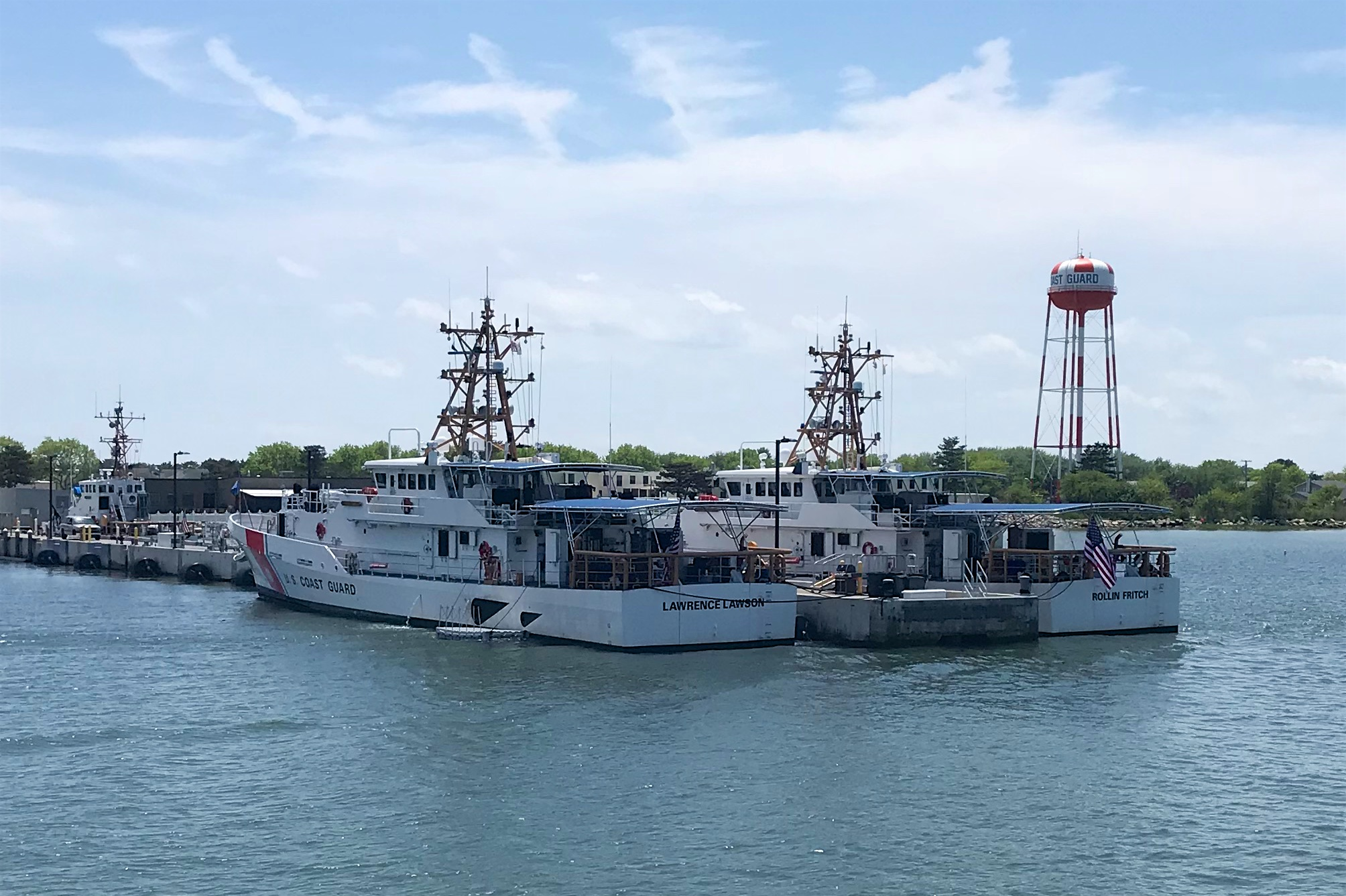
USCGC Lawrence O. Lawson and USCGC Rollin A. Fritch at homeport

== See also ==
- United States Coast Guard Training Center Birmingham-Southern
- USCG Training Center Petaluma ("A" and "C" Schools)
- USCG Training Center Yorktown ("A" School and Officer Candidate School)
- United States Coast Guard Academy New London
